= Victoria's Secret Fashion Show 2006 =

US lingerie brand fashion show

- Status: Active
- Genre: Fashion show
- Date: November 16, 2006
- Frequency: Annually
- Venue: Kodak Theatre
- Locations: Los Angeles, United States
- Years active: 1995–2003, 2005–2018, 2024–present
- Inaugurated: August 1, 1995
- Most recent: 2026
- Previous event: 2005
- Next event: 2007
- Member: Victoria's Secret
- Website: Victoria's Secret Fashion Show

The Victoria's Secret Fashion Show is an annual fashion show sponsored by Victoria's Secret, a brand of lingerie and sleepwear. Victoria's Secret uses the show to promote and market its goods in high-profile settings. The show features some of the world's leading fashion models, such as Victoria's Secret Angels Heidi Klum, Gisele Bündchen, Adriana Lima, Alessandra Ambrosio, Karolína Kurková, Izabel Goulart, and Selita Ebanks. The Pink section was premiered in this year with Jessica Stam as its brand.

The Victoria's Secret Fashion Show 2006 was recorded in Los Angeles, United States at the Kodak Theatre. The show featured musical performances by Justin Timberlake. Karolína Kurková was wearing the Victoria's Secret Fantasy Bra : Hearts On Fire Diamond Fantasy Bra worth $6,500,000.

The 11th fashion show featured some of the new Angels and also the returning Angels. There was a special performance by Justin Timberlake, and the show was hosted by Heidi Klum.

Dates	Locations	Broadcaster	Viewers (millions)	Host	Performers
November 16, 2006 (recorded), December 5, 2006 (aired)	Kodak Theatre, Los Angeles	CBS	6.8	Heidi Klum	Justin Timberlake

== Fashion show segments ==
=== Segment 1: Femme Fatale ===
Performer	Song	Status
(United States) Justin Timberlake	SexyBack	Live Performance

Nationality	Model(s)	Wings	Runway shows	Notes
(Brazil) Brazilians	Gisele Bündchen	W	1999–2003 • 2005–2006	2 Angel (2000–2007)
(Brazil) Brazilians	Alessandra Ambrosio		2000–2003 • 2005–2017 • 2024–2026	2 Angel (2004–2017)
(Brazil) Brazilians	Izabel Goulart		2005–2016	3 Angel (2005–2008)
(Czech Republic) Czech	Karolína Kurková		2000–2003 • 2005–2008 • 2010	3 Angel (2005–2009)
(Russia) Russian	Natasha Poly		2005–2006	
(Brazil) Brazilian	Raquel Zimmermann		2002 • 2005–2006	
(Sweden) Swedish	Caroline Winberg		2005–2011	
(Czech Republic) Czech	Hana Soukupová		2006–2007	Newcomer
(Canada) Canadian	Jessica Stam	W	2006–2007 • 2010	P Spokesmodel (2006–2007) • Newcomer
(Russia) Russian	Katja Shchekina		2006	Newcomer
(Belgium) Belgian	Elise Crombez		2006–2007	Newcomer
(Nigeria) Nigerian	Oluchi Onweagba	W	2000 • 2002–2003 • 2005–2007	

=== Segment 2: Coquettish Fetish ===
Performer	Song	Status
(United Kingdom) Jamelia	Beware of the Dog	Remixed Recording
(United Kingdom) Depeche Mode	Personal Jesus	Remixed Recording

Nationality	Model(s)	Wings	Runway shows	Notes
(Brazil) Brazilians	Adriana Lima	W	1999–2003 • 2005–2008 • 2010–2018 • 2024–2026	2 Angel (2000–2018)
(Brazil) Brazilians	Caroline Trentini		2005–2006 • 2009 • 2026	
(United Kingdom) British	Rosie Huntington-Whiteley		2006–2010 • 2026	Newcomer
(France) French	Morgane Dubled		2005–2008	
(Brazil) Brazilians	Jeisa Chiminazzo		2006	Newcomer
(Brazil) Brazilians	Flavia de Oliveira		2006–2008 • 2010–2011	Newcomer
(Cayman Islands) Caymanian	Selita Ebanks		2005–2010	3 Angel (2005–2009)
(Brazil) Brazilian	Ana Beatriz Barros		2002–2003 • 2005–2006 • 2008–2009	
(United States) American	Angela Lindvall		2000 • 2003 • 2005–2008	
(Kenya) Kenyan	Ajuma Nasenyana		2006	Newcomer
(Brazil) Brazilian	Alessandra Ambrosio	W	2000–2003 • 2005–2017 • 2024–2026	2 Angel (2004–2017)
(Germany) German	Julia Stegner		2005–2011	

=== Segment 3: Come Fly With Me ===
Performer	Song	Status
(United States) The Killers	When You Were Young (Thin White Duke Mix)	Remixed Recording

Nationality	Model(s)	Wings	Runway shows	Notes
(Czech Republic) Czech	Karolína Kurková		2000–2003 • 2005–2008 • 2010	3 Angel (2005–2009)
(Brazil) Brazilian	Izabel Goulart		2005–2016	3 Angel (2005–2008)
(Russia) Russian	Natasha Poly		2005–2006	
(Canada) Canadian	Andi Muise		2005–2007	
(Brazil) Brazilian	Raquel Zimmermann		2002 • 2005–2006	
(Sweden) Swedish	Caroline Winberg		2005–2011	
(Czech Republic) Czech	Hana Soukupová		2006–2007	Newcomer
(Brazil) Brazilians	Gisele Bündchen		1999–2003 • 2005–2006	2 Angel (2000–2007)
(Brazil) Brazilians	Adriana Lima		1999–2003 • 2005–2008 • 2010–2018 • 2024–2026	2 Angel (2000–2018)

=== Segment 4: PINK ===
Performer	Song	Status
(United States) Kelis	Bossy (Switch Remix); On the March; Entry of the Gladiators	Remixed Recording

Nationality	Model(s)	Wings	Runway shows	Notes
(Canada) Canadian	Jessica Stam		2006–2007 • 2010	P Spokesmodel (2006–2007) • Newcomer
(Australia) Australian	Miranda Kerr		2006–2009 • 2011–2012	Newcomer
(United Kingdom) British	Rosie Huntington-Whiteley		2006–2010 • 2026	Newcomer
(Brazil) Brazilian	Jeisa Chiminazzo		2006	Newcomer
(Canada) Canadian	Heather Marks		2006	Newcomer
(France) French	Morgane Dubled		2005–2008	
(Brazil) Brazilian	Flavia de Oliveira		2006–2008 • 2010–2011	Newcomer
(Netherlands) Dutch	Doutzen Kroes	W	2005–2006 • 2008–2009 • 2011–2014 • 2024–2026	

=== Segment 5: Highland Romance ===
Performer	Song	Status
(United Kingdom) Pipe Major Robert Mathieson	Air & Jigs	Remixed Recording
(United Kingdom) Eurythmics	I've Got a Life	Remixed Recording

Nationality	Model(s)	Wings	Runway shows	Notes
(Brazil) Brazilians	Gisele Bündchen		1999–2003 • 2005–2006	2 Angel (2000–2007)
(Brazil) Brazilians	Caroline Trentini		2005–2006 • 2009 • 2026	
(United States) American	Angela Lindvall		2000 • 2003 • 2005–2008	
(Belgium) Belgian	Elise Crombez		2006–2007	Newcomer
(Russia) Russian	Katja Shchekina		2006	Newcomer
(Canada) Canadian	Jessica Stam	W	2006–2007 • 2010	P Spokesmodel (2006–2007) • Newcomer
(Kenya) Kenyan	Ajuma Nasenyana		2006	Newcomer
(Russia) Russian	Natasha Poly		2005–2006	
(Canada) Canadian	Andi Muise		2005–2007	
(Brazil) Brazilian	Izabel Goulart	W	2005–2016	3 Angel (2005–2008)

=== Segment 6: Winter Wonderland of Glacial Goddesses ===
Performer	Song	Status
(France) David Guetta feat. (United States) Chris Willis	Just a Little More Love	Remixed Recording

Nationality	Model(s)	Wings	Runway shows	Notes
(Czech Republic) Czech	Karolína Kurková	W	2000–2003 • 2005–2008 • 2010	3 Angel (2005–2009); Wearing "Hearts On Fire Diamond Fantasy Bra" (Value: $ 6,500,000)
(Australia) Australian	Miranda Kerr		2006–2009 • 2011–2012	Newcomer
(Germany) German	Julia Stegner		2005–2011	
(Czech Republic) Czech	Hana Soukupová		2006–2007	Newcomer
(Netherlands) Dutch	Doutzen Kroes		2005–2006 • 2008–2009 • 2011–2014 • 2024–2026	
(Nigeria) Nigerian	Oluchi Onweagba		2000 • 2002–2003 • 2005–2007	
(Canada) Canadian	Heather Marks		2006	Newcomer
(Cayman Islands) Caymanian	Selita Ebanks	W	2005–2010	3 Angel (2005–2009)
(Brazil) Brazilians	Adriana Lima		1999–2003 • 2005–2008 • 2010–2018 • 2024–2026	2 Angel (2000–2018)
(Brazil) Brazilians	Alessandra Ambrosio		2000–2003 • 2005–2017 • 2024–2026	2 Angel (2004–2017)
(Brazil) Brazilians	Ana Beatriz Barros	W	2002–2003 • 2005–2006 • 2008–2009	

== Finale ==
The finale was led by Gisele Bündchen

Performer	Song	Status
Justin Timberlake	SexyBack	Remixed Recording
David Guetta feat. Chris Willis	Just a Little More Love	Remixed Recording

== Index ==
Symbol	Meaning
1	1st Generation Angels
2	2nd Generation Angels
3	3rd Generation Angels
P	PINK Spokesmodel
W	Wings
