= Victoria's Secret Fashion Show 2007 =

US lingerie brand fashion show

- Status: Active
- Genre: Fashion show
- Date: November 15, 2007
- Frequency: Annually
- Venue: Kodak Theatre
- Locations: Los Angeles, United States
- Years active: 1995–2003, 2005–2018, 2024–present
- Inaugurated: August 1, 1995
- Most recent: 2026
- Previous event: 2006
- Next event: 2008
- Member: Victoria's Secret
- Website: Victoria's Secret Fashion Show

Victoria's Secret Angels 2007

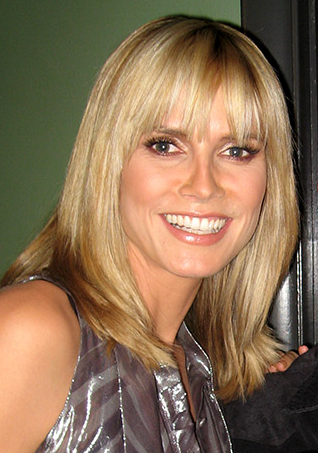
Heidi Klum

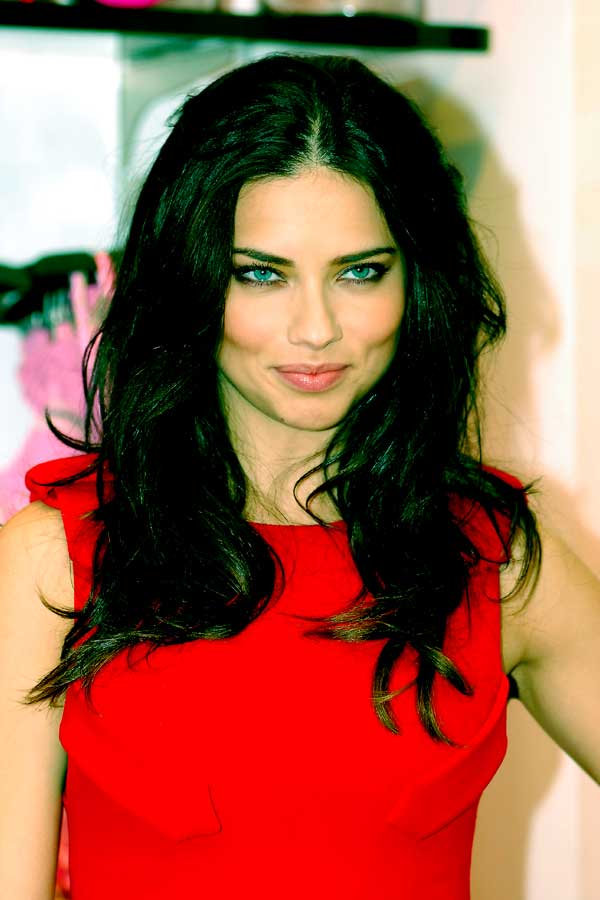
Adriana Lima

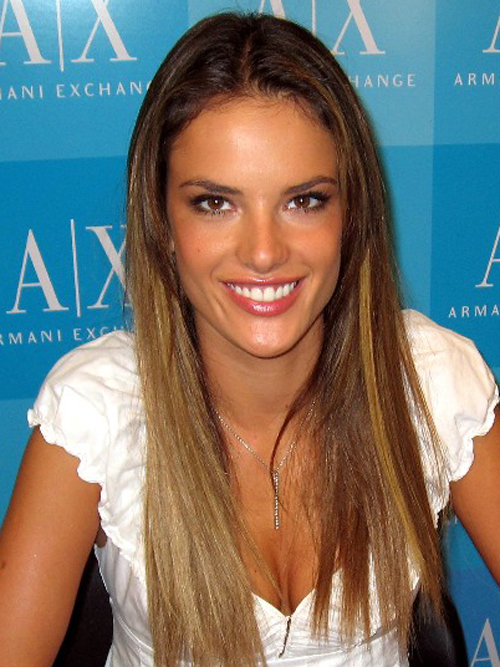
Alessandra Ambrosio

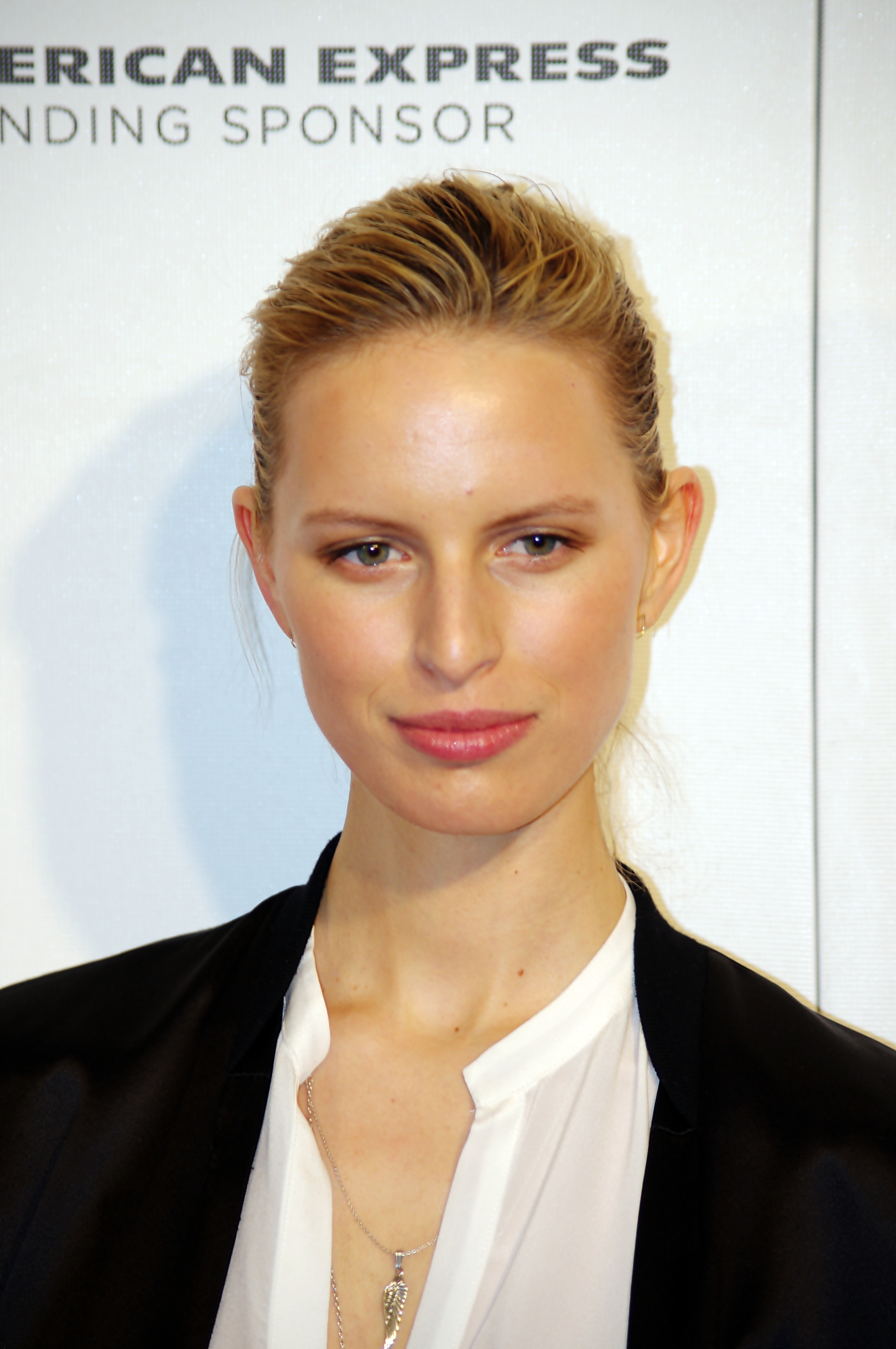
Karolina Kurkova

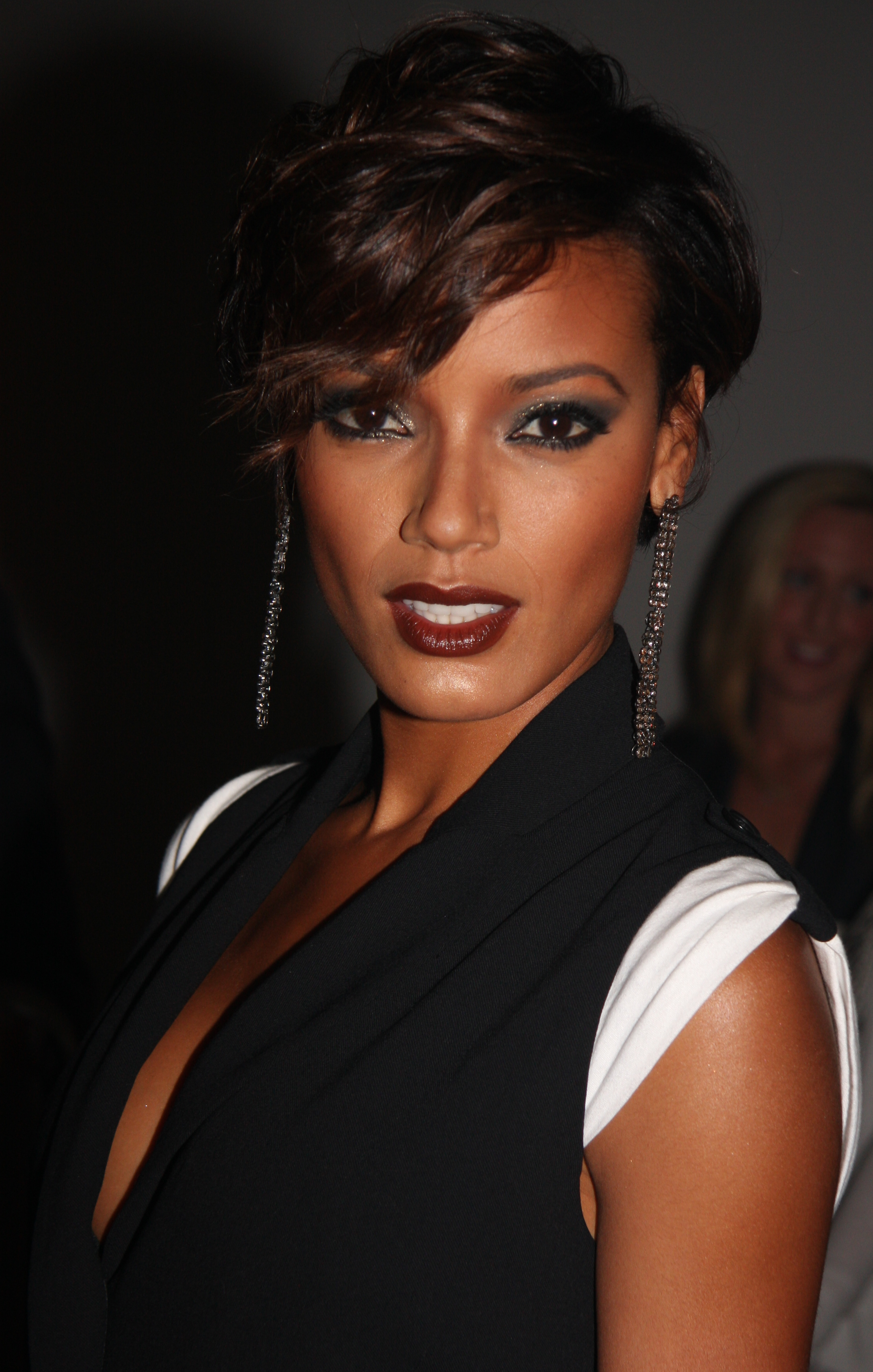
Selita Ebanks

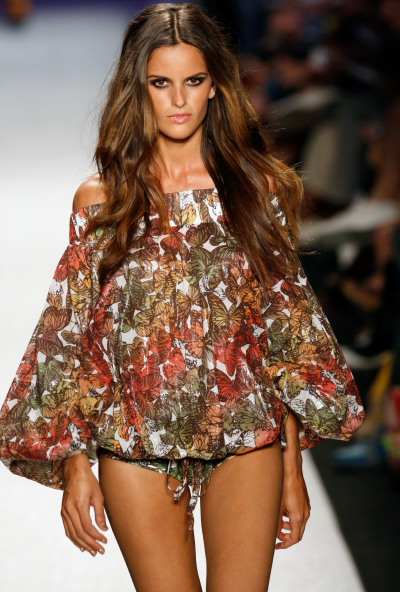
Izabel Goulart

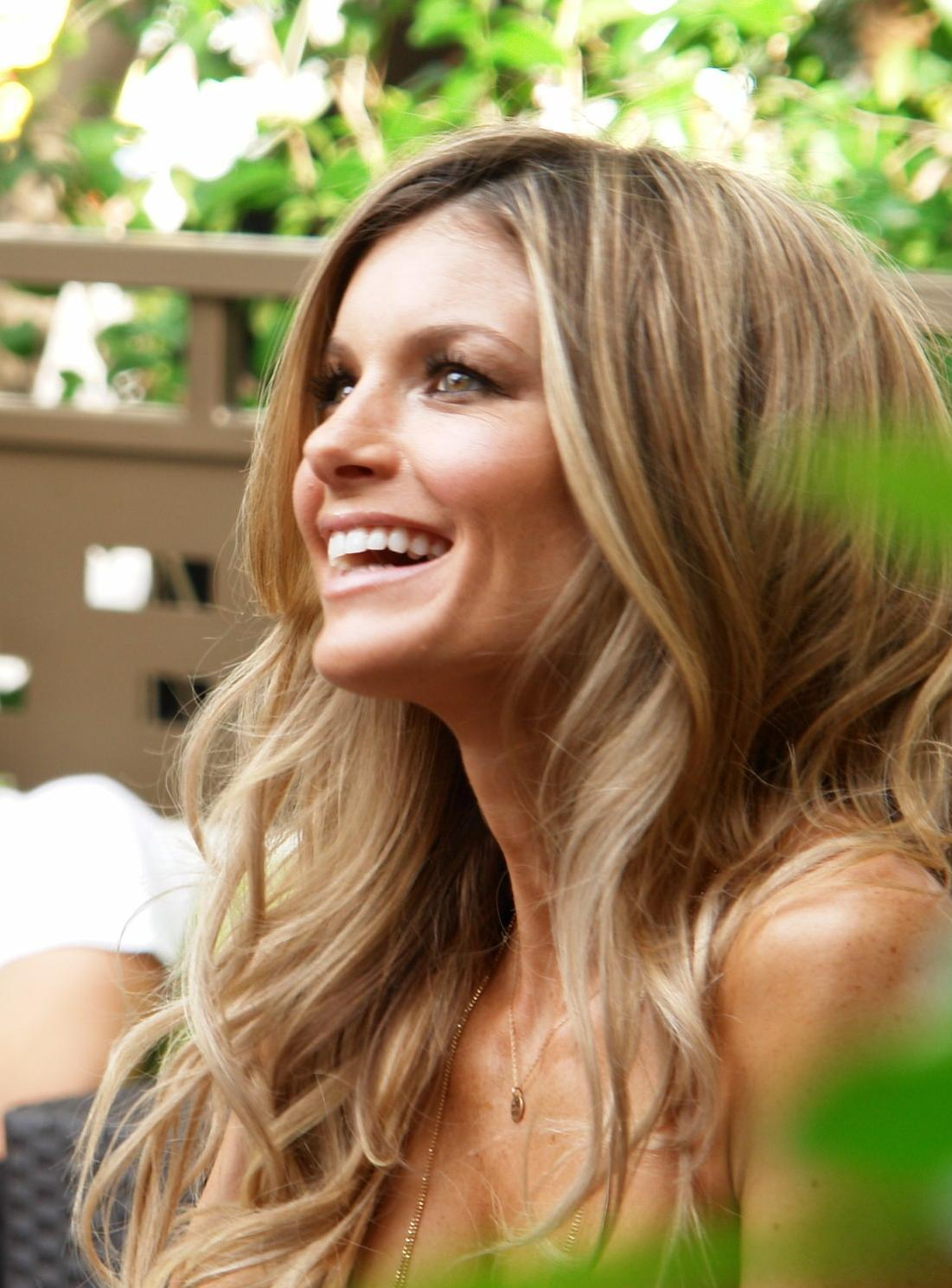
Marisa Miller

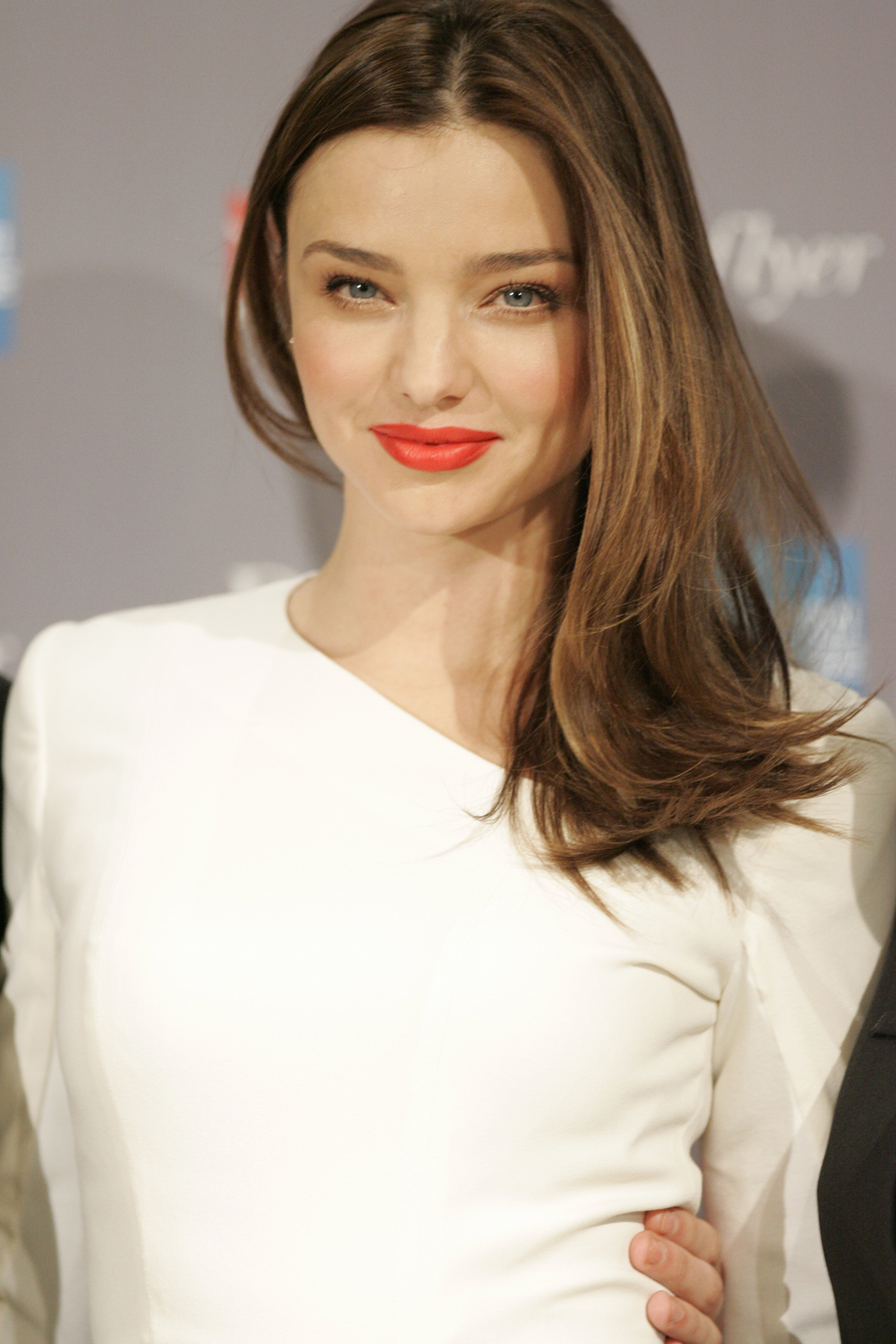
Miranda Kerr

The Victoria's Secret Fashion Show is an annual fashion show sponsored by Victoria's Secret, a brand of lingerie and sleepwear. Victoria's Secret uses the show to promote and market its goods in high-profile settings. The show features some of the world's leading fashion models, such as current Victoria's Secret Angels Heidi Klum, Adriana Lima, Alessandra Ambrosio, Karolina Kurkova, Izabel Goulart, Selita Ebanks, Miranda Kerr, and Marisa Miller.

The 12th fashion show featured some of the new Angels and also the returning Angels. There were special performances by will.i.am, Seal and the Spice Girls, and the show was hosted by Heidi Klum.

Dates	Locations	Broadcaster	Viewers (millions)	Host	Performers	Previous	Next
November 16, 2007 (recorded), December 4, 2007 (aired)	Kodak Theatre, Los Angeles	CBS	7.4	Heidi Klum	will.i.am, Spice Girls, Seal and Heidi Klum	2006	2008

== Fashion show segments ==
=== Segment 1: Blade Runner ===
Performer	Song	Status
(United States) will.i.am	"I Got It From My Mama"	Live Performance

Nationality	Model(s)	Wings	Runway Shows	Notes
(Brazil) Brazilian	Adriana Lima		1999-2003 • 2005-2008 • 2010-2018 • 2024–2026	2 Angel (2000-2018)
(Czech Republic) Czech	Karolína Kurková		2000-2003 • 2005-2008 • 2010	3 Angel (2005-2009)
(Germany) German	Julia Stegner	W	2005-2011	
(Czech Republic) Czech	Hana Soukupová		2006-2007	
(France) French	Noémie Lenoir	W	2007-2008	Newcomer
(Brazil) Brazilian	Isabeli Fontana		2003 • 2005 • 2007-2010 • 2012 • 2014 • 2024	Comeback
(Cayman Islands) Caymanian	Selita Ebanks		2005-2010	3 Angel (2005-2009)
(Brazil) Brazilian	Alessandra Ambrosio		2000-2003 • 2005-2017 • 2024–2026	2 Angel (2004-2017)
(Germany) German	Heidi Klum		1997–2003 • 2005 • 2007–2009	1 Angel (1999-2010)
(Brazil) Brazilian	Izabel Goulart	W	2005-2016	3 Angel (2005-2008)

=== Segment 2: Age Of Elegance ===
Performer	Song	Status
(United Kingdom) Cass Fox	"Touch Me"	Remixed Recording
(Canada) Finger Eleven	"Paralyzer"	Remixed Recording

Nationality	Model(s)	Wings	Runway Shows	Notes
(Slovakia) Slovak	Michaela Kocianova		2007	Newcomer
(France) French	Morgane Dubled		2005–2008	
(Latvia) Latvian	Ingūna Butāne		2005 • 2007-2008	Comeback
(Brazil) Brazilian	Flávia de Oliveira		2006-2008 • 2010-2011	
(Montenegro) Montenegrin	Marija Vujović	W	2005 • 2007	Comebacks
(Russia) Russian	Eugenia Volodina		2002-2003 • 2005 • 2007	Comebacks
(Sweden) Swedish	Caroline Winberg		2005-2011	
(United States) Americans	Erin Wasson		2007	Newcomer
(United States) Americans	Angela Lindvall		2000 • 2003 • 2005-2008	
(Belgium) Belgian	Élise Crombez	W	2006-2007	

=== Segment 3: Think Pink ===
Performer	Song	Status
(Australia) The Vines	"Get Free"	Remixed Recording

Nationality	Model(s)	Wings	Runway Show(s)	Notes
(Australia) Australian	Miranda Kerr		2006-2009 • 2011-2012	3 Angel (2007-2013) • P Spokesmodel (2006-2009)
(South Africa) South African	Candice Swanepoel		2007-2015 • 2017-2018 • 2024–2026	Newcomer
(Namibia) Namibian	Behati Prinsloo		2007-2015 • 2018 • 2024–2026	Newcomer
(Canada) Canadian	Andi Muise	W	2005-2007	
(United States) American	Lindsay Ellingson		2007-2014	Newcomer
(United Kingdom) British	Rosie Huntington-Whiteley		2006-2010 • 2026	
(United States) American	Katie Wile		2007	PINK Model Hunt Winner • Newcomer
(Canada) Canadian	Jessica Stam	W	2006-2007 • 2010	P Spokesmodel (2006–2007)
(Brazil) Brazilian	Flávia de Oliveira		2006-2008 • 2010-2011	

=== Segment 4: Rome Antique ===
Artist	Song	Status
(United Kingdom) Eurythmics	"Who’s That Girl"	Remixed Recording

Nationality	Model(s)	Wings	Runway Show(s)	Notes
(Czech Republic) Czech	Karolína Kurková		2000–2003 • 2005-2008 • 2010	3 Angel (2005-2009)
(France) French	Noémie Lenoir		2007-2008	Newcomer
(Germany) German	Julia Stegner		2005-2011	
(Czech Republic) Czech	Hana Soukupová	W	2006-2007	
(Nigeria) Nigerian	Oluchi Onweagba		2000 • 2002-2003 • 2005-2007	
(Russia) Russian	Eugenia Volodina		2002-2003 • 2005 • 2007	Comeback
(United States) Americans	Erin Wasson		2007	Newcomer
(United States) Americans	Marisa Miller		2007-2009	3 Angel (2007-2009) • Newcomer
(Belgium) Belgian	Élise Crombez		2006-2007	
(Brazil) Brazilian	Alessandra Ambrosio	W	2000-2003 • 2005-2017 • 2024–2026	2 Angel (2004-2017)

=== Segment 5: Sureally Sexy ===
Artist	Song	Status
(United Kingdom) Apollo 440	"Stop the Rock"	Remixed Recording

Nationality	Model(s)	Wings	Runway Show(s)	Notes
(United States) American	Angela Lindvall	W	2000 • 2003 • 2005-2008	
(Cayman Islands) Caymanian	Selita Ebanks		2005-2010	3 Angel (2005-2009)
(France) French	Morgane Dubled		2005-2008	
(Montenegro) Montenegrin	Marija Vujović		2005 • 2007	Comeback
(Brazil) Brazilian	Izabel Goulart		2005-2016	3 Angel (2005-2008
(United States) American	Jessica White		2007	Newcomer
(Germany) German	Heidi Klum		1997–2003 • 2005 • 2007–2009	1 Angel (1999-2010) • Comeback
(Brazil) Brazilians	Isabeli Fontana		2003 • 2005 • 2007-2010 • 2012 • 2014 • 2024	Comeback
(Brazil) Brazilians	Adriana Lima	W	1999–2003 • 2005-2008 • 2010–2018 • 2024–2026	2 Angel (2000-2018)

=== Segment 6: Deck the Halls ===
Artist	Song	Status
(United Kingdom) Seal	"Amazing (Thin White Duke Edit)"	Live Performance

Nationality	Model(s)	Wings	Runway Show(s)	Notes
(Cayman Islands) Caymanian	Selita Ebanks		2005-2010	3 Angel (2005-2009); Wearing "Holiday Fantasy Bra" (Value: $4,500,000)
(Latvia) Latvian	Ingūna Butāne		2005 • 2007-2008	Comeback
(Australia) Australian	Miranda Kerr		2006-2009 • 2011-2012	3 Angel (2007-2013) • P Spokesmodel (2006-2009)
(Czech Republic) Czech	Karolina Kurkova	W	1997–2003 • 2005 - 2008 • 2010	3 Angel (2005-2009)
(Brazil) Brazilian	Izabel Goulart		2005-2016	3 Angel (2005-2008)
(United States) American	Marisa Miller		2007-2009	3 Angel (2007-2009) • Newcomer
(Brazil) Brazilian	Alessandra Ambrosio		2000-2003 • 2005-2017 • 2024–2026	2 Angel (2004-2017)
(Slovakia) Slovak	Michaela Kocianova		2007	Newcomer
(Brazil) Brazilian	Isabeli Fontana		2003 • 2005 • 2007-2010 • 2012 • 2014 • 2024	Comeback
(Germany) German	Julia Stegner		2005-2011	
(Canada) Canadian	Jessica Stam		2006-2007 • 2010	P Spokesmodel (2006–2007)
(Brazil) Brazilian	Adriana Lima		1999–2003 • 2005-2008 • 2010–2018 • 2024–2026	2 Angel (2000-2018)
(Germany) German	Heidi Klum	W	1997–2003 • 2005 • 2007–2009	1 Angel (1999-2010)

== Finale ==
Ingūna Butāne led the finale and models of only last section walked the finale, rest were displayed on giant rotating Christmas tree.

== Index ==
Symbol	Meaning
1	1st Generation Angels
2	2nd Generation Angels
3	3rd Generation Angels
P	PINK Spokesmodel
W	Wings
