= Victoria's Secret Fashion Show 2009 =

Fashion show sponsored by Victoria's Secret

- Status: Active
- Genre: Fashion show
- Date: November 19, 2009
- Frequency: Annually
- Venue: 69th Regiment Armory
- Locations: New York City, United States
- Years active: 1995–2003, 2005–2018, 2024–present
- Inaugurated: August 1, 1995
- Most recent: 2026
- Previous event: 2008
- Next event: 2010
- Member: Victoria's Secret
- Website: Victoria's Secret Fashion Show

Victoria's Secret Angels 2009
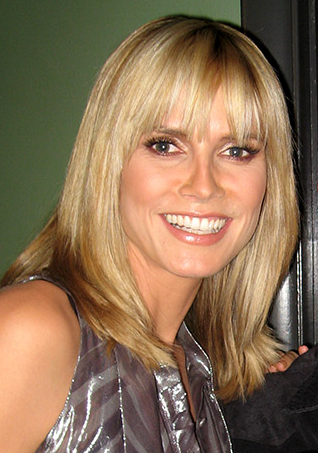
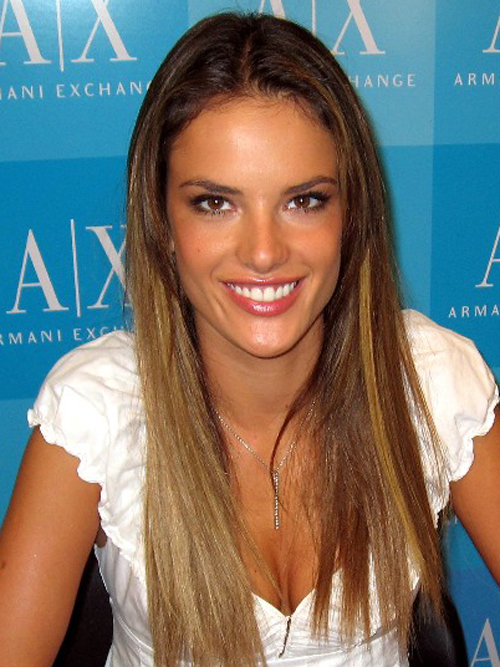
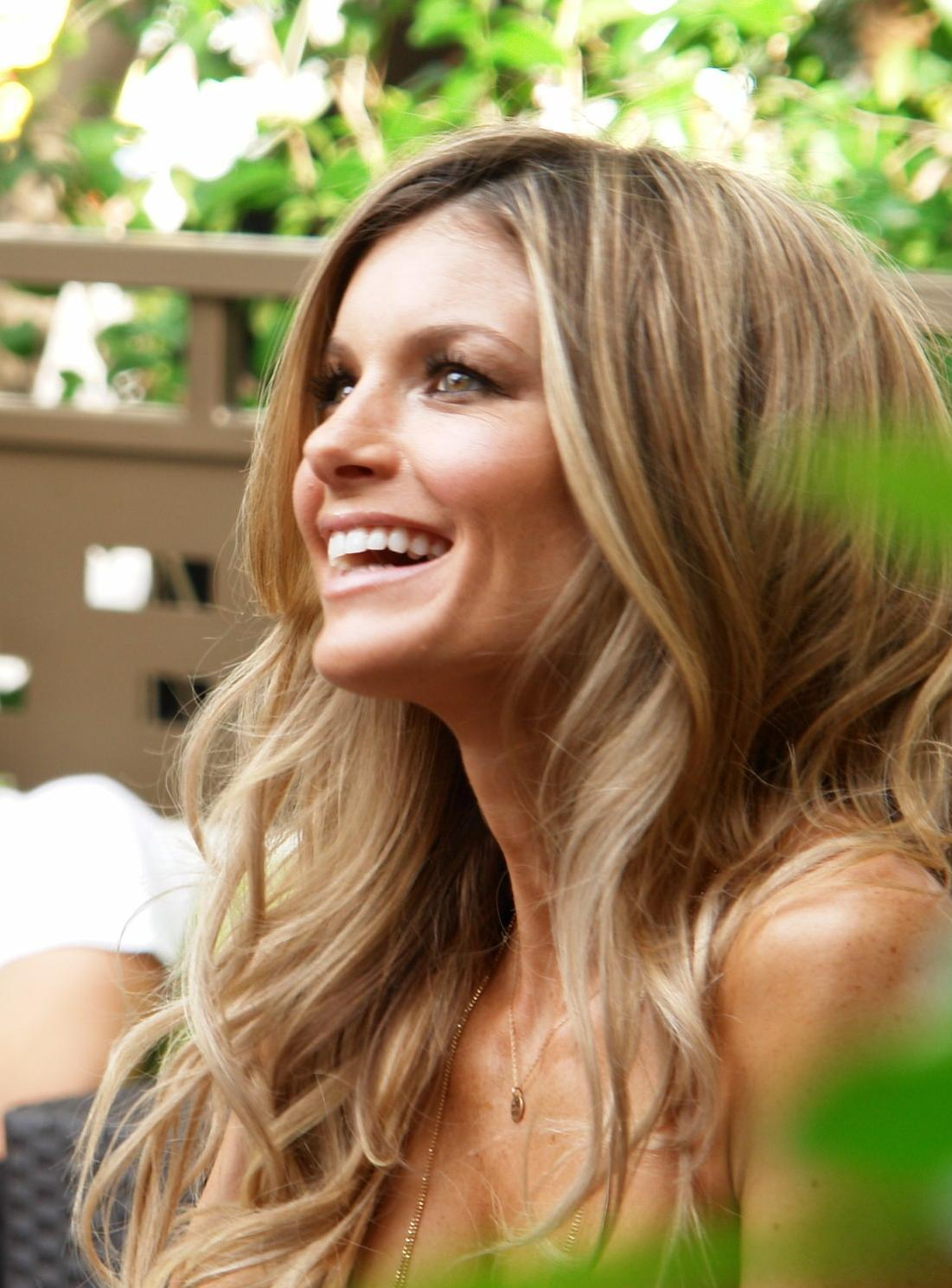
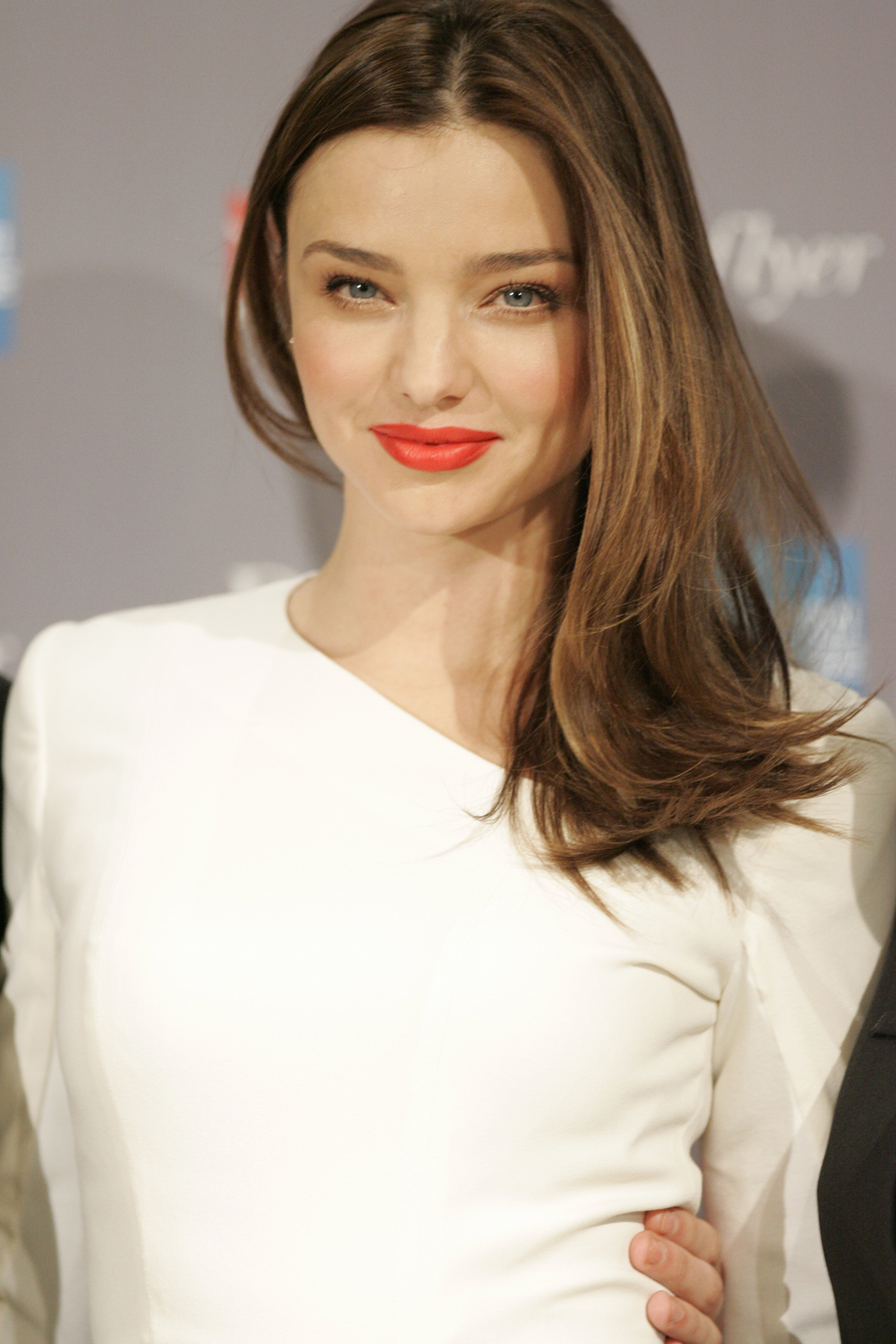
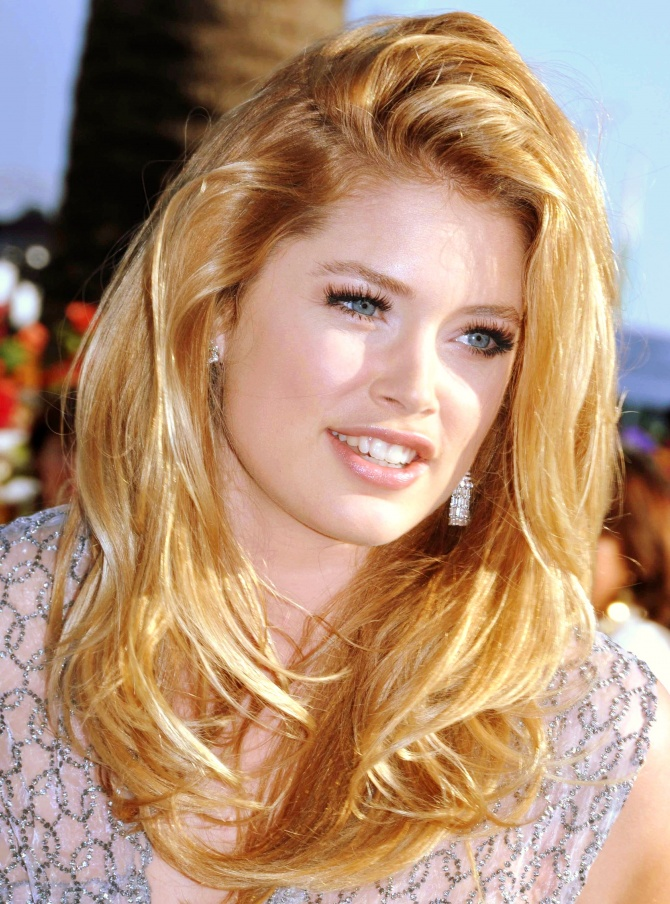
Victoria's Secrets 2009 Angels Campaign (left to right in each row) Heidi Klum, Alessandra Ambrosio, Marisa Miller, Miranda Kerr, and Doutzen Kroes. Also included for the brand Candice Swanepoel, Rosie Huntington-Whiteley, Erin Heatherton, Lindsay Ellingson, and Behati Prinsloo.

The Victoria's Secret Fashion Show is an annual fashion show sponsored by Victoria's Secret, a brand of lingerie and sleepwear. Victoria's Secret uses the show to promote and market its goods in high-profile settings. The show features some of the world's leading fashion models, such as current Victoria's Secret Angels Heidi Klum, Alessandra Ambrosio, Miranda Kerr, Doutzen Kroes, and Marisa Miller. Behati Prinsloo, Candice Swanepoel, Rosie Huntington-Whiteley, Lindsay Ellingson, and Erin Heatherton were also featured. Adriana Lima and Karolina Kurkova were absent this year due to their pregnancies. Adriana gave birth to her daughter 4 days before the show and Karolina gave birth to her son 3 weeks before the show.

The 14th fashion show featured some of the new Angels and also the returning Angels. There was a special performance by The Black Eyed Peas, and the show was hosted by Heidi Klum.

| Dates | Locations | Broadcaster | Viewers (millions) | Host | Performers | Previous | Next |
|---|---|---|---|---|---|---|---|
| November 19, 2009 (recorded), December 1, 2009 (aired) | Lexington Avenue Armory, New York City | CBS | 8.3 | Heidi Klum | The Black Eyed Peas | 2008 | 2010 |

== Fashion show segments ==
=== Segment 1: Star Trooper ===
| Artist | Song | Status |
|---|---|---|
| (United States) The Black Eyed Peas | "Boom Boom Pow" | Live Performance |

| Nationality | Model | Wings | Runway Shows | Status |
|---|---|---|---|---|
| (Brazil) Brazilian | Alessandra Ambrosio | ꒰১ ໒꒱ | 2000–2003 • 2005–2017 • 2024–2026 | VS 2 Angel (2004–2017) |
| (Australia) Australian | Miranda Kerr | | 2006–2009 • 2011–2012 | VS 3 Angel (2007–2013) |
| (Belarus) Belarusian | Maryna Linchuk | ꒰১ ໒꒱ | 2008–2011 • 2013 | |
| (Brazil) Brazilian | Caroline Trentini | | 2005–2006 • 2009 • 2026 | |
| (Brazil) Brazilian | Izabel Goulart | | 2005–2016 | Former VS 3 Angel (2005–2008) |
| (China) Chinese | Liu Wen | | 2009–2012 • 2016–2018 • 2024–2026 | ✿ |
| (South Africa) South African | Candice Swanepoel | | 2007–2015 • 2017–2018 • 2024–2026 | ★ |
| (Australia) Australian | Abbey Lee Kershaw | | 2008–2009 | |
| (Cayman Islands) Caymanian | Selita Ebanks | | 2005–2010 | Former VS 3 Angel (2005–2009) |
| (United States) American | Erin Heatherton | | 2008–2013 | ★ |
| (Poland) Polish | Anja Rubik | ꒰১ ໒꒱ | 2009–2011 | ✿ |

=== Segment 2: All Aboard ===
| Artist | Song | Status |
|---|---|---|
| (United States) Kadoc | "The Nighttrain" | Remixed Recording |
| (United States) Kings of Leon | "Sex on Fire" | Remixed Recording |
| (United Kingdom) The Police | "Message in a Bottle" | Remixed Recording |

| Nationality | Model | Wings | Runway Shows | Status | Fantasy Bra | Price |
|---|---|---|---|---|---|---|
| (Netherlands) Dutch | Doutzen Kroes | ꒰১ ໒꒱ | 2005–2006 • 2008–2009 • 2011–2014 • 2024–2026 | VS 3 Angel (2008–2014) | | |
| (United States) American | Chanel Iman | | 2009–2011 | ✿ | | |
| (Germany) German | Julia Stegner | | 2005–2011 | | | |
| (Lithuania) Lithuanian | Edita Vilkevičiūtė | | 2008–2010 | | | |
| (Brazil) Brazilian | Isabeli Fontana | | 2003 • 2005 • 2007–2010 • 2012 • 2014 • 2024 | | | |
| (Brazil) Brazilian | Ana Beatriz Barros | | 2002–2003 • 2005–2006 • 2008–2009 | | | |
| (United States) American | Sessilee Lopez | | 2008–2009 | | | |
| (United States) American | Marisa Miller | | 2007–2009 | VS 3 Angel (2007–2009) | Harlequin Fantasy Bra | $3,000,000 |
| (Sweden) Swedish | Caroline Winberg | | 2005–2011 | | | |
| (United States) American | Lindsay Ellingson | | 2007–2014 | ★ | | |
| (Senegal) Senegalese | Aminata Niaria | | 2009 | ✿ | | |
| (United Kingdom) British | Rosie Huntington-Whiteley | | 2006–2010 • 2026 | ★ | | |

=== Segment 3: PINK Planet ===
| Artist | Song | Status |
|---|---|---|
| (United States) Kings of Leon | "Use Somebody" | Remixed Recording |
| (United States) The Four Tops | "It's The Same Old Song" | Remixed Recording |

| Nationality | Model | Wings | Runway Shows | Status |
|---|---|---|---|---|
| (Namibia) Namibian | Behati Prinsloo | ꒰১ ໒꒱ | 2007–2015 • 2018 • 2024–2026 | New VS 3 (2009–2019) PINK (2008–2011) Angel |
| (South Africa) South African | Candice Swanepoel | | 2007–2015 • 2017–2018 • 2024–2026 | ★ |
| (Hungary) Hungarian | Enikő Mihalik | | 2009 • 2014 | ✿ |
| (Russia) Russian | Anastasia Kuznetsova | | 2009 | ✿ |
| (United States) American | Erin Heatherton | ꒰১ ໒꒱ | 2008–2013 | ★ |
| (United States) American | Lyndsey Scott | | 2009 | ✿ |
| (United States) American | Lily Aldridge | | 2009–2017 • 2025 | ✿ |
| (Australia) Australian | Abbey Lee Kershaw | | 2008–2009 | |
| (Sweden) Swedish | Dorothea Barth Jörgensen | | 2009 • 2012 | ✿ |
| (Australia) Australian | Elyse Taylor | | 2009 | ✿ |
| (United States) American | Chanel Iman | | 2009–2011 | ✿ |
| (United States) American | Shannan Click | | 2008–2011 | |

=== Special Performance ===
| Artist | Song | Status |
|---|---|---|
| (United States) The Black Eyed Peas | "Meet Me Halfway" | Live Performance |

=== Segment 4: Enchanted Forest ===
| Artist | Song | Status |
|---|---|---|
| (Republic of Ireland) The Script | "The Man Who Can't Be Moved" | Remixed Recording |

| Nationality | Model | Wings | Runway Shows | Status |
|---|---|---|---|---|
| (Germany) German | Heidi Klum | | 1997–2003 • 2005 • 2007–2009 | VS 1 Angel (1999–2010) |
| (United Kingdom) British | Rosie Huntington-Whiteley | | 2006–2010 • 2026 | ★ |
| (Australia) Australian | Miranda Kerr | ꒰১ ໒꒱ | 2006–2009 • 2011–2012 | VS 3 Angel (2007–2013) |
| (Brazil) Brazilian | Alessandra Ambrosio | | 2000–2003 • 2005–2017 • 2024–2026 | VS 2 Angel (2004–2017) |
| (Netherlands) Dutch | Doutzen Kroes | | 2005–2006 • 2008–2009 • 2011–2014 • 2024–2026 | VS 3 Angel (2008–2014) |
| (Brazil) Brazilian | Izabel Goulart | ꒰১ ໒꒱ | 2005–2016 | Former VS 3 Angel (2005–2008) |
| (Lithuania) Lithuanian | Edita Vilkevičiūtė | | 2008–2010 | |
| (Sweden) Swedish | Caroline Winberg | | 2005–2011 | |
| (Poland) Polish | Anja Rubik | | 2009–2011 | ✿ |
| South Africa | Candice Swanepoel | ꒰১ ໒꒱ | 2007–2015 • 2017–2018 • 2024–2026 | ★ |
| (United States) American | Lindsay Ellingson | | 2007–2014 | ★ |
| (Australia) Australian | Abbey Lee Kershaw | ꒰১ ໒꒱ | 2008–2009 | |
| (Russia) Russian | Tatiana Kovylina | | 2005 • 2009 | ʚĭɞ |
| (Brazil) Brazilian | Caroline Trentini | ꒰১ ໒꒱ | 2005–2006 • 2009 • 2026 | ʚĭɞ |

=== Segment 5: Romantic Journey ===
| Artist | Song | Status |
|---|---|---|
| (United Kingdom) Leona Lewis | "Happy" | Remixed Recording |

| Nationality | Model | Wings | Runway Shows | Status |
|---|---|---|---|---|
| (United States) American | Marisa Miller | ꒰১ ໒꒱ | 2007–2009 | VS 3 Angel (2007–2009) |
| (Brazil) Brazilian | Isabeli Fontana | | 2003 • 2005 • 2007–2010 • 2012 • 2014 • 2024 | |
| (Germany) German | Julia Stegner | | 2005–2011 | |
| (Belarus) Belarusian | Maryna Linchuk | | 2008–2011 • 2013 | |
| (Poland) Polish | Anna Jagodzińska | | 2009 | ✿ |
| (Cayman Islands) Caymanian | Selita Ebanks | | 2005–2010 | Former VS 3 Angel (2005–2009) |
| (United States) American | Sessilee Lopez | | 2008–2009 | |
| (United States) American | Kylie Bisutti | | 2009 | |
| (Brazil) Brazilian | Ana Beatriz Barros | | 2002–2003 • 2005–2006 • 2008–2009 | |
| (Senegal) Senegalese | Aminata Niaria | | 2009 | ✿ |
| (Australia) Australian | Miranda Kerr | ꒰১ ໒꒱ | 2006–2009 • 2011–2012 | VS 3 Angel (2007–2013) |
| (United Kingdom) British | Rosie Huntington-Whiteley | ꒰১ ໒꒱ | 2006–2010 • 2026 | ★ |
| (Brazil) Brazilian | Alessandra Ambrosio | ꒰১ ໒꒱ | 2000–2003 • 2005–2017 • 2024–2026 | VS 2 Angel (2004–2017) |
| (Netherlands) Dutch | Doutzen Kroes | ꒰১ ໒꒱ | 2005–2006 • 2008–2009 • 2011–2014 • 2024–2026 | VS 3 Angel (2008–2014) |

== Finale ==
Doutzen Kroes and Heidi Klum led the finale.

== Index ==
| Symbol | Meaning |
|---|---|
| VS 1 | 1st Generation Angels |
| VS 2 | 2nd Generation Angels |
| VS 3 | 3rd Generation Angels |
| PINK | PINK Angels |
| ★ | Star Billing |
| ʚĭɞ | Comeback Models |
| ✄┈ | Fit Models |
| ✿ | Debuting Models |
| ꒰১ ໒꒱ | Wings |
| ˚₊‧꒰ა ໒꒱ ‧₊˚ | Swarovski Wing |
