= Flávia de Oliveira =

Brazilian fashion model (born 1983)

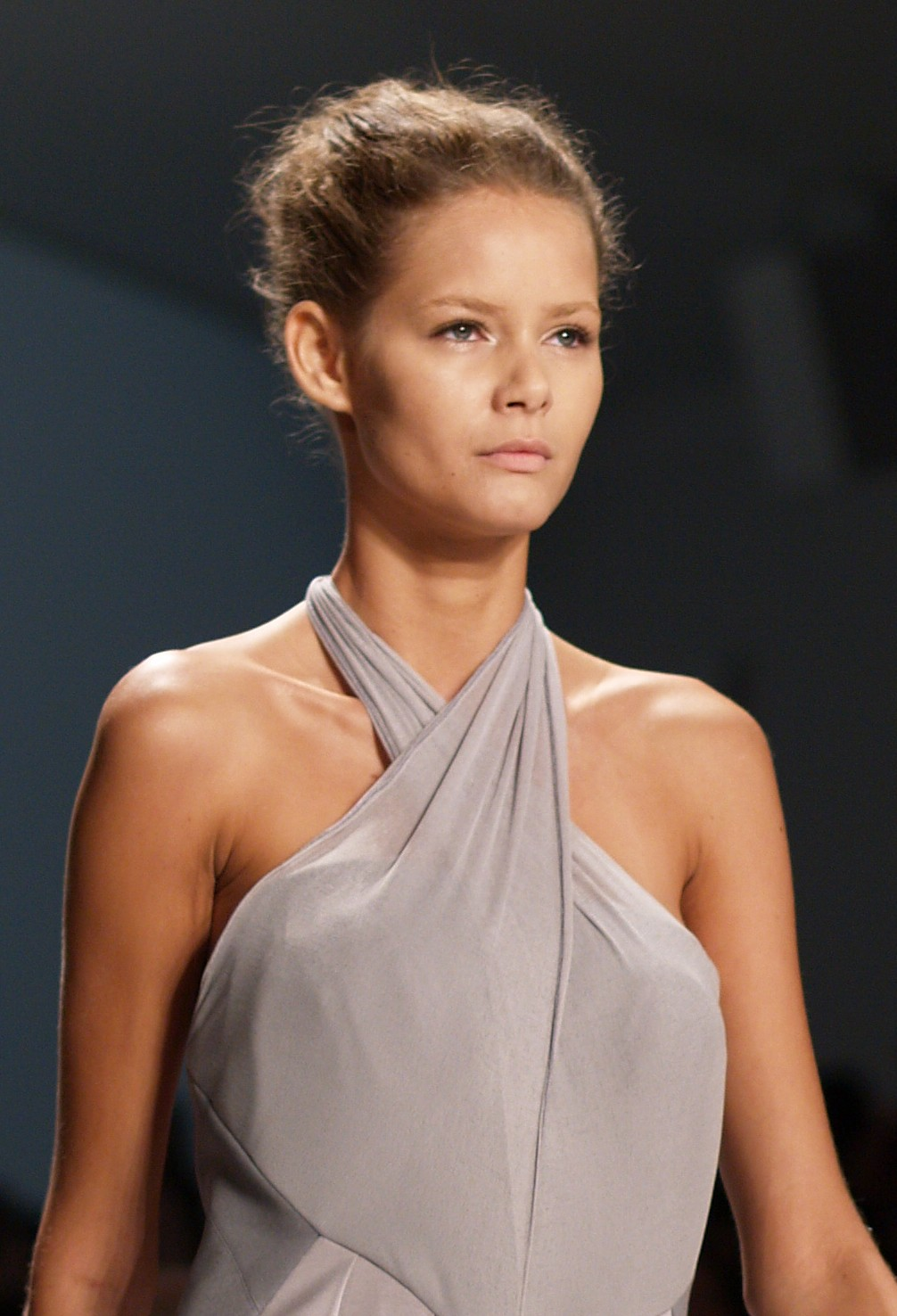
- Model Flavia de Oliveira modeling for Doo.Ri, Fall 2006, New York Fashion Week, 15 September 2006
- Born: 17 July 1983 (age 43); Londrina, Brazil
- Spouse: Rodrigo Leite
- Children: 2
- Modeling information
- Height: 1.78 m (5 ft 10 in)
- Hair color: Brown
- Eye color: Green
- Agency: View Management (Barcelona); Elite Model Management (Copenhagen); MP MEGA MIAMI (Miami Beach); Louisa Models (Munich)

Flávia de Oliveira (born 17 July 1983) is a Brazilian fashion model who participated in the 2006, 2007, 2008, 2010, and 2011 Victoria's Secret Fashion Shows. She has also modeled in shows for Dior, Valentino, Missoni, Gucci, Balenciaga, and Chanel. She has appeared in advertising for Blumarine, Dolce & Gabbana, Michael Kors, Pomellato, and Salvatore Ferragamo.

== Agencies ==
- Ford Models, New York, Miami, Brazil
- Women Model Management, Milan
- VIVA Model Management, Paris
