= Victoria's Secret Fashion Show 2008 =

US lingerie brand fashion show

- Status: Active
- Genre: Fashion show
- Date: November 15, 2008
- Frequency: Annually
- Venue: Fontainebleau Miami Beach
- Locations: Miami, United States
- Years active: 1995–2003, 2005–2018, 2024–present
- Inaugurated: August 1, 1995
- Most recent: 2026
- Previous event: 2007
- Next event: 2009
- Member: Victoria's Secret
- Website: Victoria's Secret Fashion Show

Victoria's Secret Angels 2008
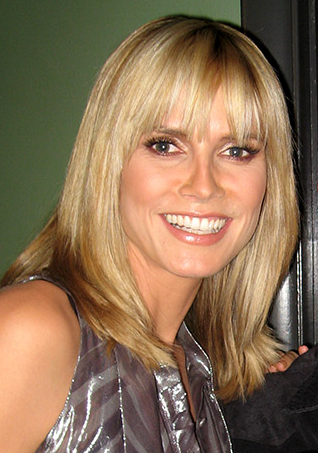
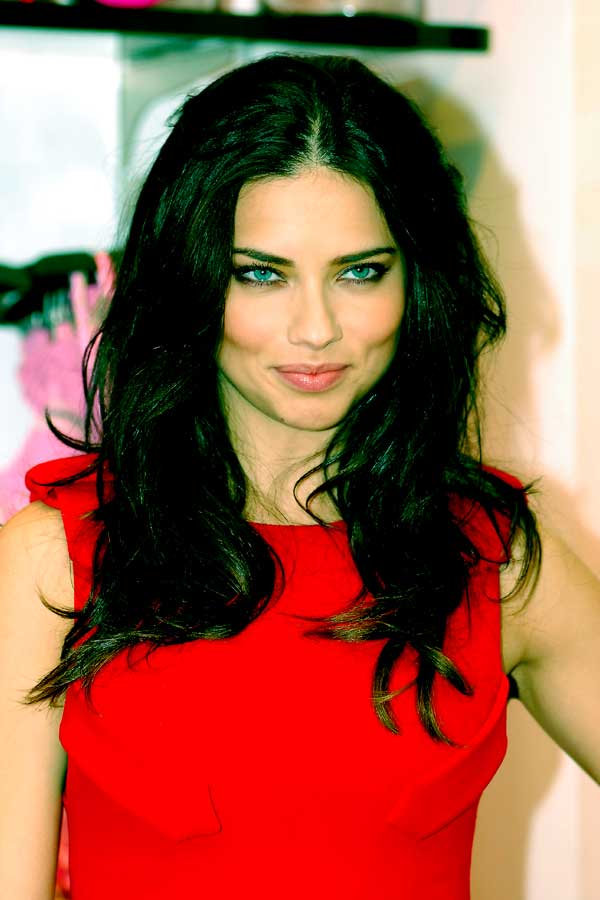
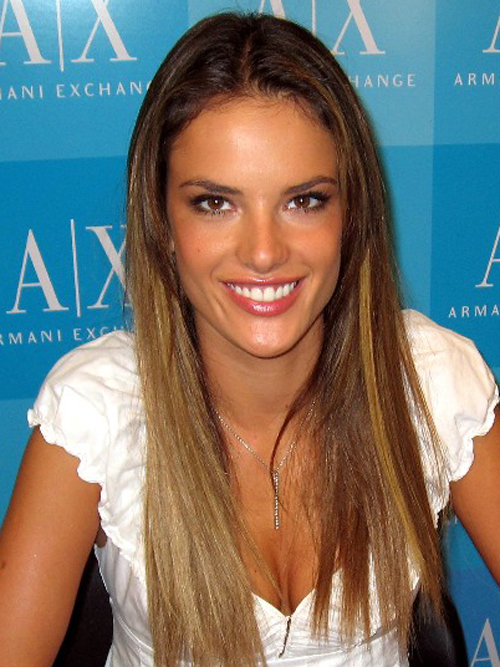
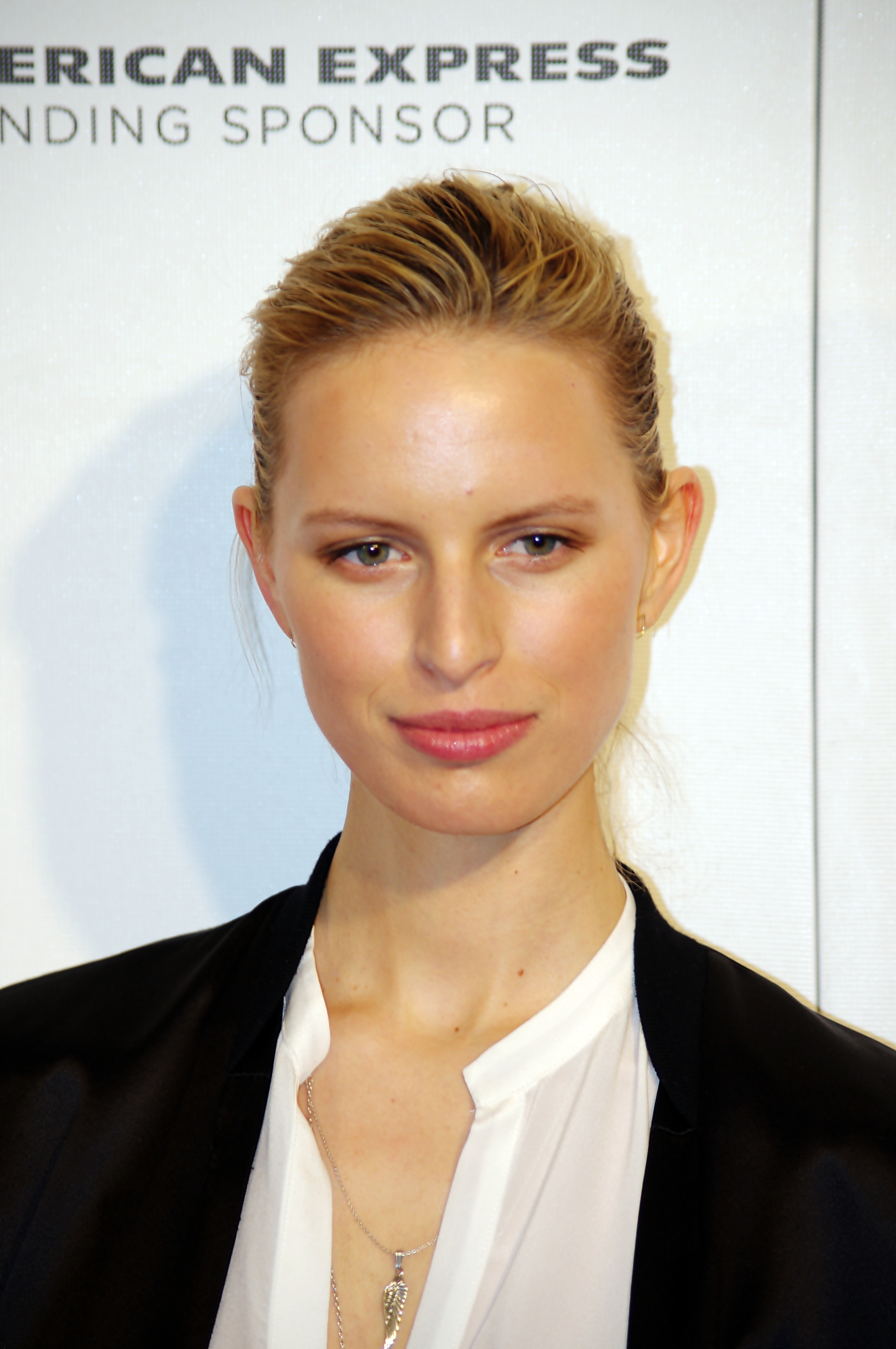
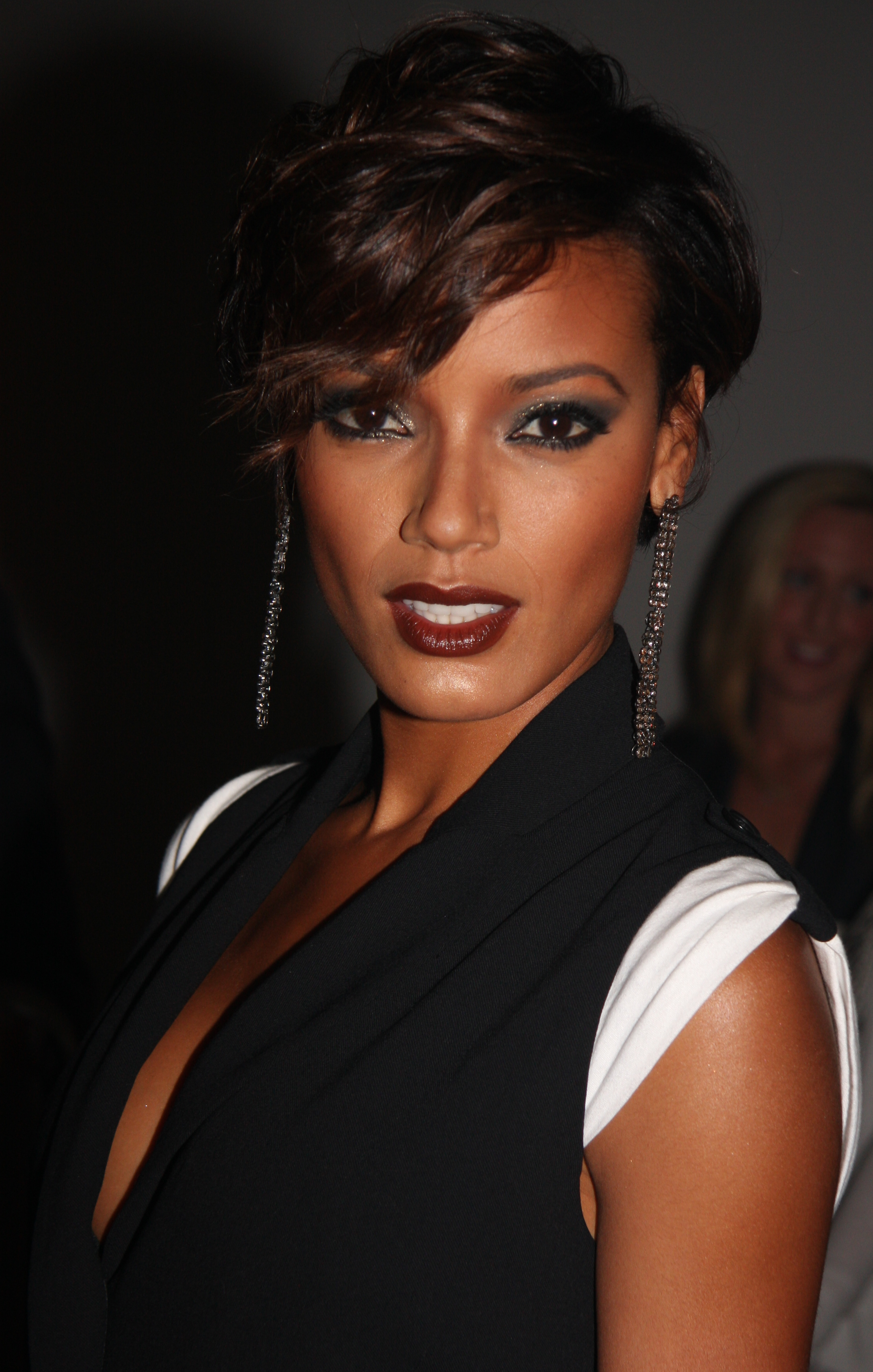
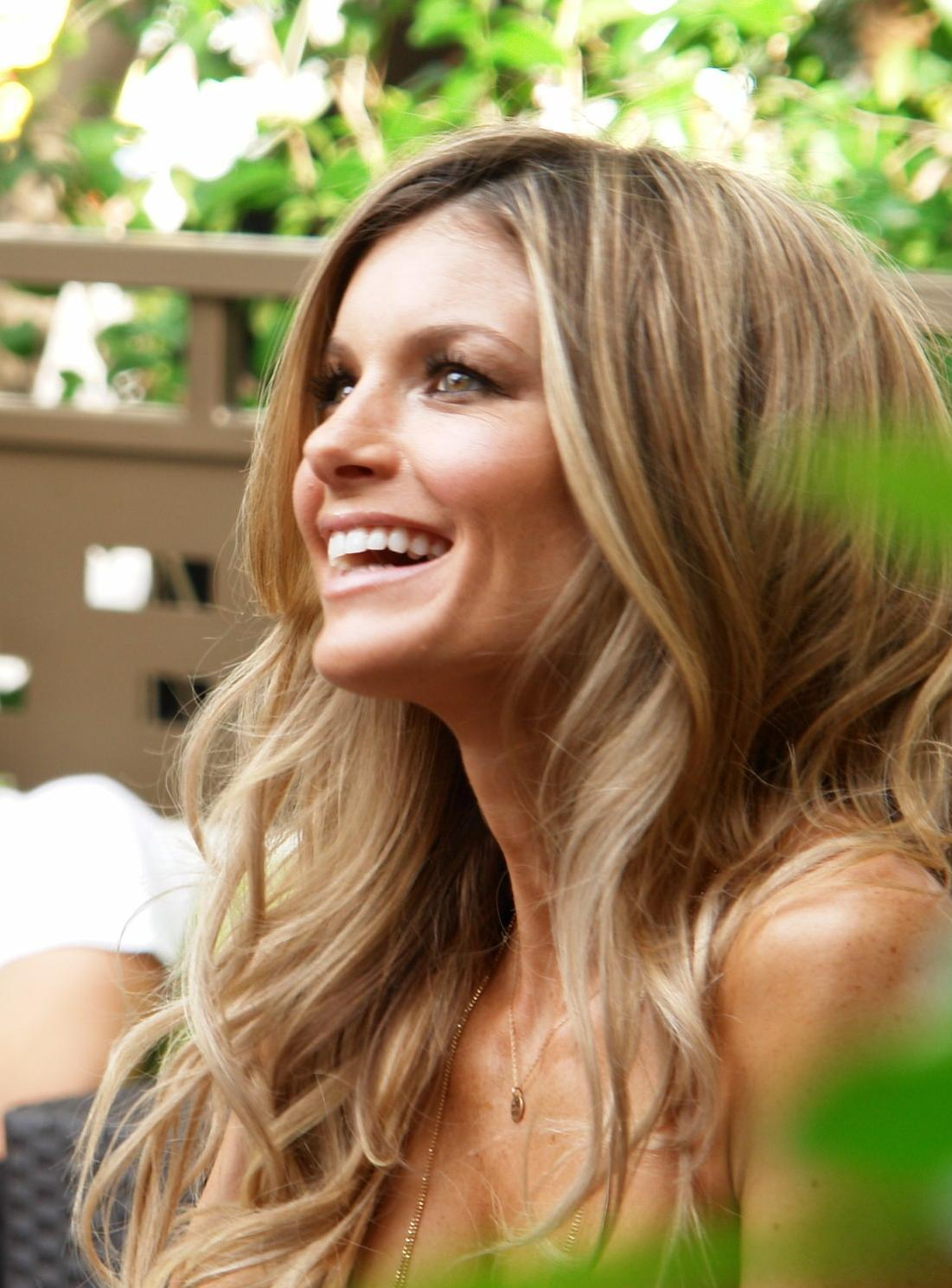
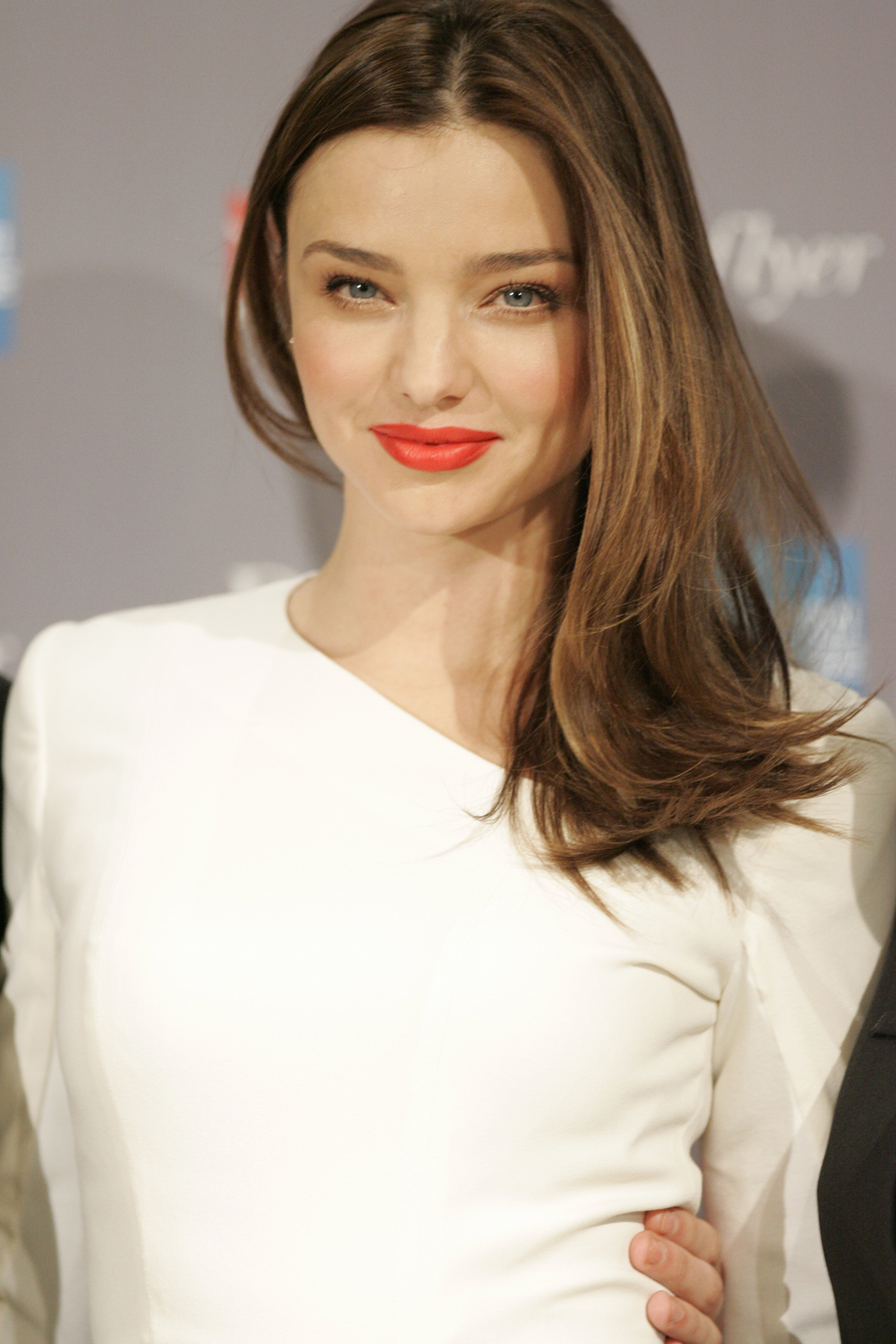
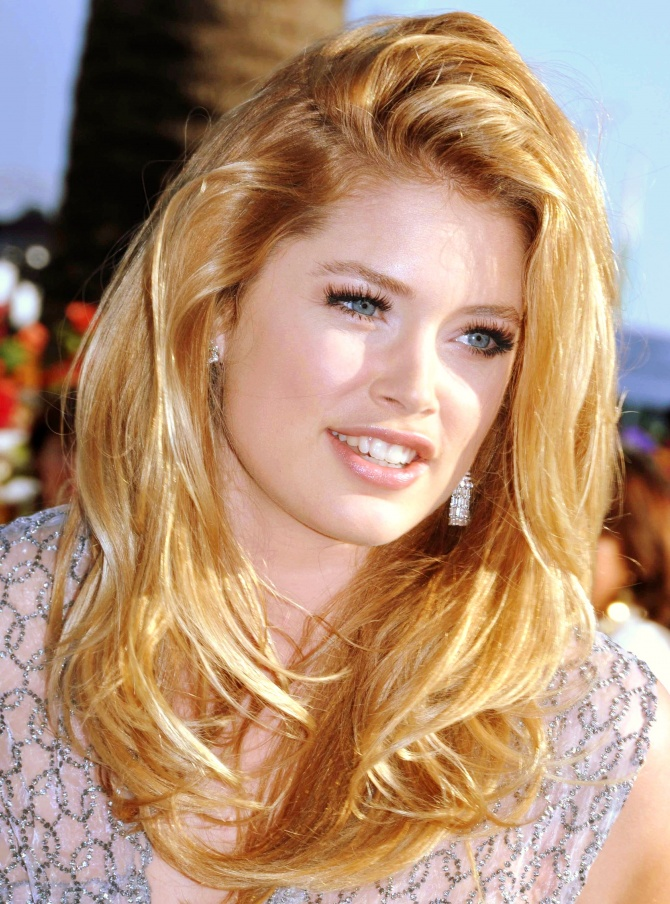
Victoria's Secrets 2008 Angels (left to right in each row): Heidi Klum, Adriana Lima, Alessandra Ambrosio, Karolina Kurkova, Selita Ebanks, Marisa Miller, Miranda Kerr, and Doutzen Kroes.

The Victoria's Secret Fashion Show is an annual fashion show sponsored by Victoria's Secret, a brand of lingerie and sleepwear. Victoria's Secret uses the show to promote and market its goods in high-profile settings. The show features some of the world's leading fashion models, such as current Victoria's Secret Angels Heidi Klum, Adriana Lima, Alessandra Ambrosio, Karolina Kurkova, Selita Ebanks, Miranda Kerr, Doutzen Kroes, and Marisa Miller. This year, Behati Prinsloo replaced Miranda Kerr as the Pink spokesmodel.

The 13th fashion show featured some of the new Angels and also the returning Angels. There were special performances by Usher and Jorge Moreno, and the show was hosted by Heidi Klum.

Dates	Locations	Broadcaster	Viewers (millions)	Host	Performers	Previous	Next
November 15, 2008 (recorded), December 3, 2008 (aired)	Fontainebleau Hotel, Miami	CBS	8.7	Heidi Klum	Usher and Jorge Moreno	2007	2009

== Fashion show segments ==
=== Segment 1: Glamour Goddess ===
Artist	Song(s)	Status
(United States) Usher	"What's Your Name" • "Yeah!"	Live Performance • Medley

Nationality	Model	Wings	Runway Shows	Notes
(Brazil) Brazilians	Adriana Lima		1999–2003 • 2005–2008 • 2010–2018 • 2024–2026	2 Angel (2000–2018)
(Brazil) Brazilians	Alessandra Ambrosio	W	2000–2003 • 2005–2017 • 2024–2026	2 Angel (2004–2017)
(Australia) Australian	Miranda Kerr		2006–2009 • 2011–2012	3 Angel (2007–2013) • P Spokesmodel (2006-2009)
(Belarus) Belarusian	Maryna Linchuk		2008–2011 • 2013	Newcomer
(Cayman Islands) Caymanian	Selita Ebanks	W	2005–2010	3 Angel (2005–2009)
(Czech Republic) Czech	Karolína Kurková		2000–2003 • 2005–2008 • 2010	2 Angel (2005–2009)
(Germany) German	Heidi Klum		1997–2003 • 2005 • 2007–2009	1 Angel (1999–2010)
(Russia) Russian	Anne Vyalitsyna		2008 • 2010–2011	Newcomer
(Brazil) Brazilian	Izabel Goulart	W	2005–2016	Former 3 Angel (2005–2008)
(Netherlands) Dutch	Doutzen Kroes		2005–2006 • 2008–2009 • 2011–2014 • 2024–2026	3 Angel (2008–2014)
(Germany) German	Julia Stegner		2005–2011	
(South Africa) South African	Candice Swanepoel		2007–2015 • 2017–2018 • 2024–2026	Fitting Model

(Brazil) Adriana Lima returned to the runway to close the performance

=== Segment 2: Dangerous ===
Artist	Song	Status
(Cuba) Jorge Moreno	Babalu	Live Performance

Nationality	Model	Wings	Runway Shows	Notes
(United States) American	Marisa Miller		2007–2009	3 Angel (2007–2009)
(Brazil) Brazilian	Flávia de Oliveira		2006–2008 • 2010–2011	
(Estonia) Estonian	Carmen Kass		1999–2000 • 2002–2003 • 2008	Comeback
(Spain) Spanish	Clara Alonso		2008	Newcomer
(France) French	Morgane Dubled		2005–2008	
(Brazil) Brazilian	Emanuela de Paula		2008 • 2010–2011	Newcomer
(France) French	Noémie Lenoir		2007–2008	
(Netherlands) Dutch	Lara Stone		2008	Newcomer
(Brazil) Brazilian	Isabeli Fontana		2003 • 2005 • 2007–2010 • 2012 • 2014 • 2024	
(United States) Americans	Sessilee Lopez		2008–2009	Newcomer
(United States) Americans	Angela Lindvall		2000 • 2003 • 2005–2008	
(Brazil) Brazilian	Ana Beatriz Barros		2002–2003 • 2005–2006 • 2008–2009	Comeback

=== Segment 3: The Moderns ===
Artist	Song(s)	Status
(United States) The Killers	"Human"	Remixed Recording

Nationality	Model	Wings	Runway Shows	Notes
(Brazil) Brazilian	Alessandra Ambrosio		2000–2003 • 2005–2017 • 2024–2026	2 Angel (2004–2017)
(United Kingdom) British	Rosie Huntington-Whiteley		2006–2010 • 2026	
(Latvia) Latvian	Ingūna Butāne		2005 • 2007–2008	
(Sweden) Swedish	Caroline Winberg		2005–2011	
(Brazil) Brazilian	Adriana Lima		1999–2003 • 2005–2008 • 2010–2018 • 2024–2026	2 Angel (2000–2018)
(Cayman Islands) Caymanian	Selita Ebanks		2005–2010	3 Angel (2005–2009)
(Dominican Republic) Dominican	Arlenis Sosa		2008	Newcomer
(United States) American	Marisa Miller		2007–2009	3 Angel (2007–2009)
(Australia) Australian	Miranda Kerr		2006–2009 • 2011–2012	3 Angel (2007–2013) • P Spokesmodel (2006-2009)

=== Segment 4: PINK Planet ===
Artist	Song(s)	Status
(United Kingdom) The Ting Tings	"That's Not My Name"	Remixed Recording

Nationality	Model	Wings	Runway Shows	Notes
(Namibia) Namibian	Behati Prinsloo		2007–2015 • 2018 • 2024–2026	P Spokesmodel (2008–2011)
(United States) American	Erin Heatherton		2008–2013	Newcomer
(Australia) Australian	Sarah Stephens		2008	Newcomer
(Australia) Australian	Abbey Lee Kershaw		2008–2009	Newcomer
(United States) American	Shannan Click		2008–2011	Newcomer
(Lithuania) Lithuanian	Edita Vilkevičiūtė		2008–2010	Newcomer
(United States) American	Lindsay Ellingson		2007–2014	
(South Africa) South African	Candice Swanepoel	W	2007–2015 • 2017–2018 • 2024–2026	Fitting Model
(United Kingdom) British	Rosie Huntington-Whiteley		2006–2010 • 2026	
(Brazil) Brazilian	Flávia de Oliveira		2006–2008 • 2010–2011	

=== Segment 5: Ballet de Fleurs ===
Artist	Song(s)	Status
(United States) Chris Brown	"With You"	Recording Remixed

Nationality	Model	Wings	Runway Shows	Notes
(Netherlands) Dutch	Doutzen Kroes		2005–2006 • 2008–2009 • 2011–2014 • 2024–2026	3 Angel (2008–2014) • Comeback
(Germany) German	Heidi Klum		1997–2003 • 2005 • 2007–2009	1 Angel (1999–2010)
(South Africa) South African	Candice Swanepoel		2007–2015 • 2017–2018 • 2024–2026	Fitting Model
(Australia) Australian	Miranda Kerr	W	2006–2009 • 2011–2012	3 Angel (2007–2013)
Sweden	Caroline Winberg		2005–2011	
(Brazil) Brazilian	Emanuela de Paula		2008 • 2010–2011	Newcomer
(Belarus) Belarusian	Maryna Linchuk		2008–2011 • 2013	Newcomer
(United States) American	Sessilee Lopez		2008–2009	Newcomer
(Spain) Spanish	Clara Alonso		2008	Newcomer
(Czech Republic) Czech	Karolína Kurková		2000–2008 • 2010	3 Angel (2005–2009)
(Latvia) Latvian	Ingūna Butāne		2005 • 2007–2008	
(Germany) German	Julia Stegner	W	2005–2011	

=== Segment 6: Black Tie Holiday ===
Artist	Song	Status
(United States) Kanye West	Love Lockdown	Remixed Recording

Nationality	Model	Wings	Runway Shows	Notes
(Cayman Islands) Caymanian	Selita Ebanks		2005–2010	3 Angel (2005–2009)
(Brazil) Brazilian	Izabel Goulart		2005–2016	Former 3 Angel (2005–2008)
(Brazil) Brazilian	Ana Beatriz Barros		2002–2003 • 2005–2006 • 2008–2009	Comeback
(Brazil) Brazilian	Isabeli Fontana		2003 • 2005 • 2007–2010 • 2012 • 2014 • 2024	
(France) French	Noémie Lenoir		2007–2008	
(Brazil) Brazilian	Alessandra Ambrosio		2000–2003 • 2005–2017 • 2024–2026	2 Angel (2004–2017)
(United States) American	Angela Lindvall		2000 • 2003 • 2005–2008	
(Brazil) Brazilian	Adriana Lima	W	1999–2003 • 2005–2008 • 2010–2018 • 2024–2026	2 Angel (2000–2018) • Wearing "Black Diamond Fantasy Miracle Bra" (Value: $5,000,000)
(Netherlands) Dutch	Lara Stone		2008	Newcomer
(United States) American	Marisa Miller		2007–2009	3 Angel (2007–2009)
(Estonia) Estonian	Carmen Kass		1999–2000 • 2002–2003 • 2008	Comeback
(Netherlands) Dutch	Doutzen Kroes		2005–2006 • 2008–2009 • 2011–2014 • 2024–2026	3 Angel (2008–2014)
(Germany) German	Heidi Klum	W	1997–2003 • 2005 • 2007–2009	1 Angel (1999–2010)

== Finale ==
Marisa Miller and Maryna Linchuk led the finale.

== Index ==
Symbol	Meaning
1	1st Generation Angels
2	2nd Generation Angels
3	3rd Generation Angels
P	PINK Spokesmodels
W	Wings
