= Victoria's Secret Fashion Show 2010 =

US lingerie brand fashion show

- Status: Active
- Genre: Fashion show
- Date: November 10, 2010
- Frequency: Annually
- Venue: 69th Regiment Armory
- Locations: New York City, United States
- Years active: 1995–2003, 2005–2018, 2024–present
- Inaugurated: August 1, 1995
- Most recent: 2026
- Previous event: 2009
- Next event: 2011
- Member: Victoria's Secret
- Website: Victoria's Secret Fashion Show

Victoria's Secret Angels 2010
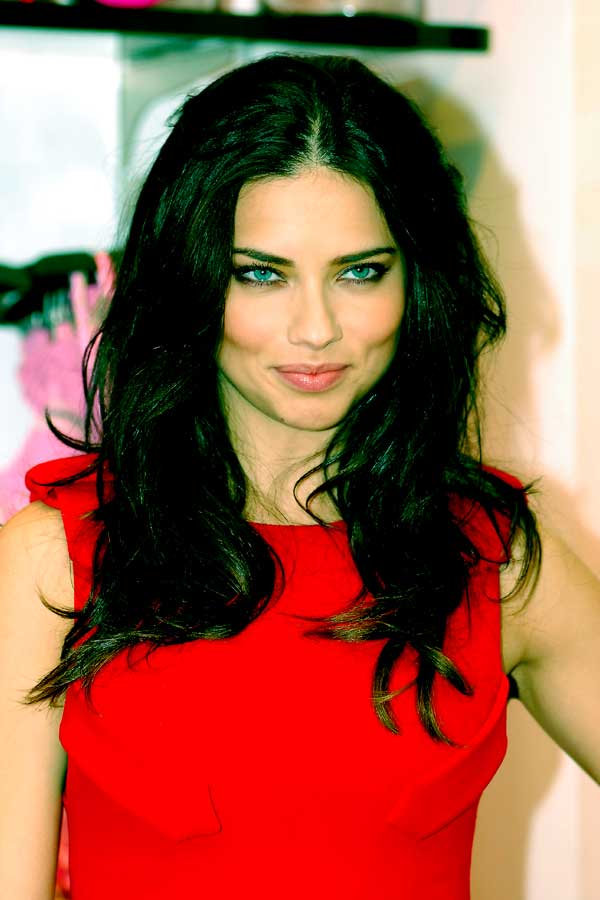
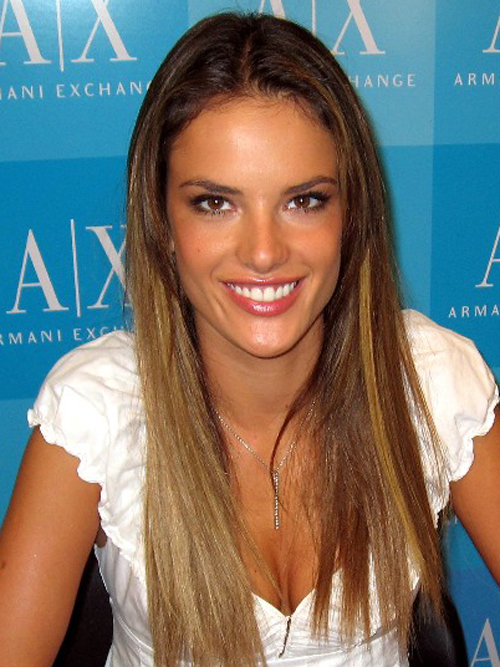
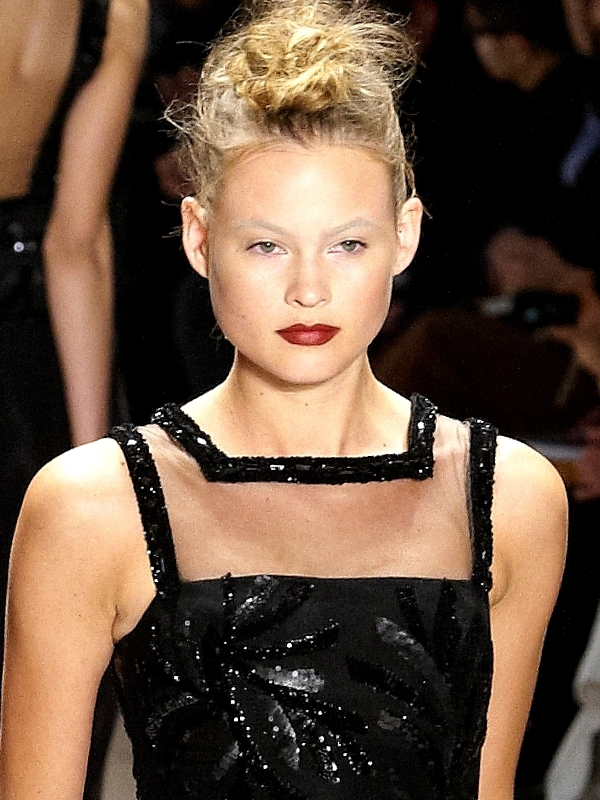
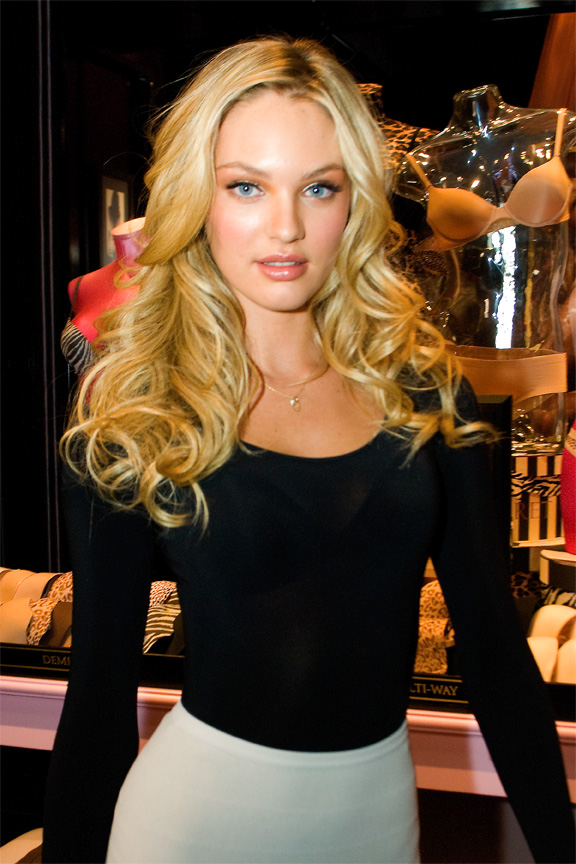
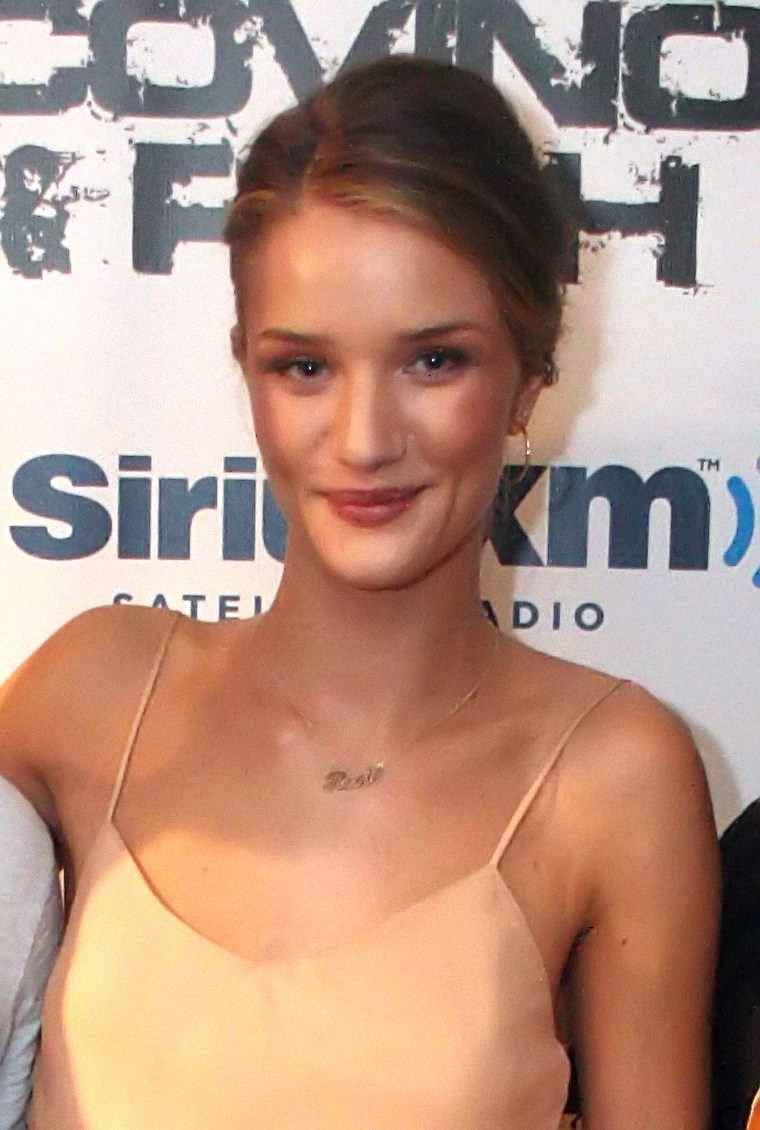
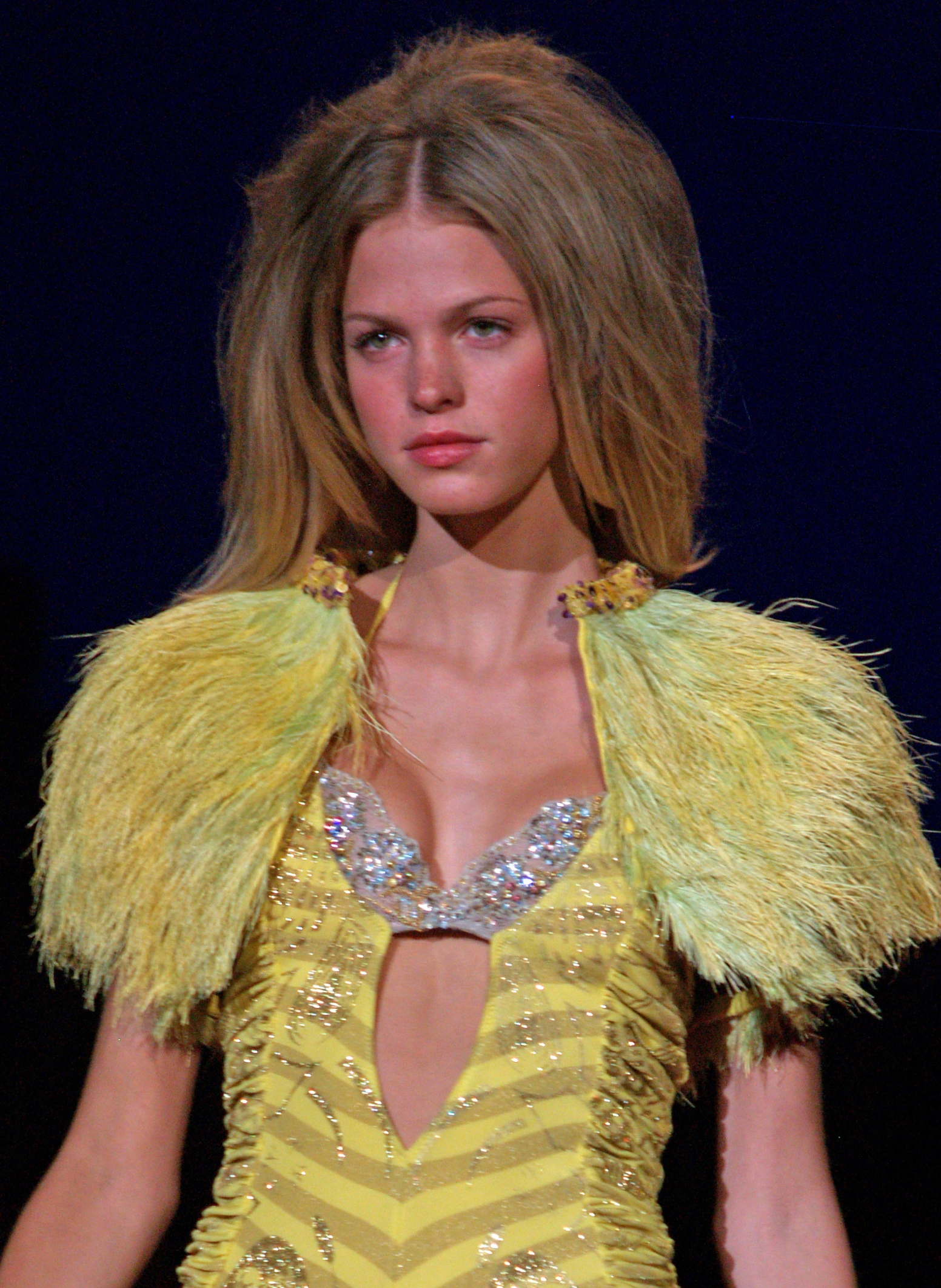
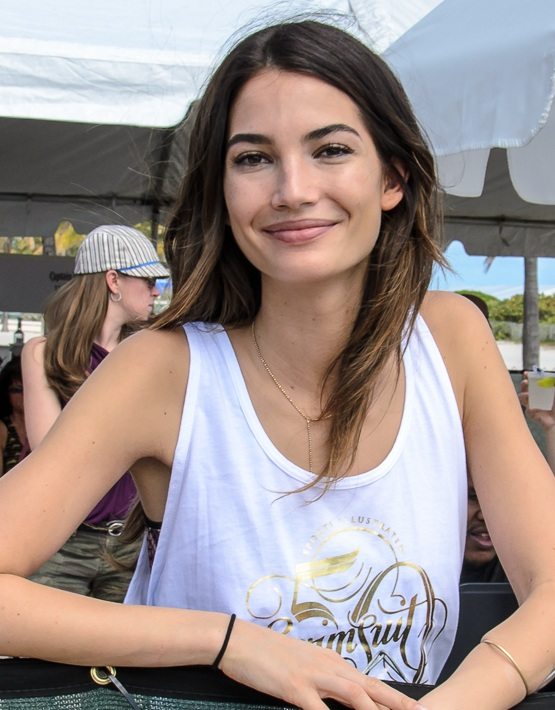
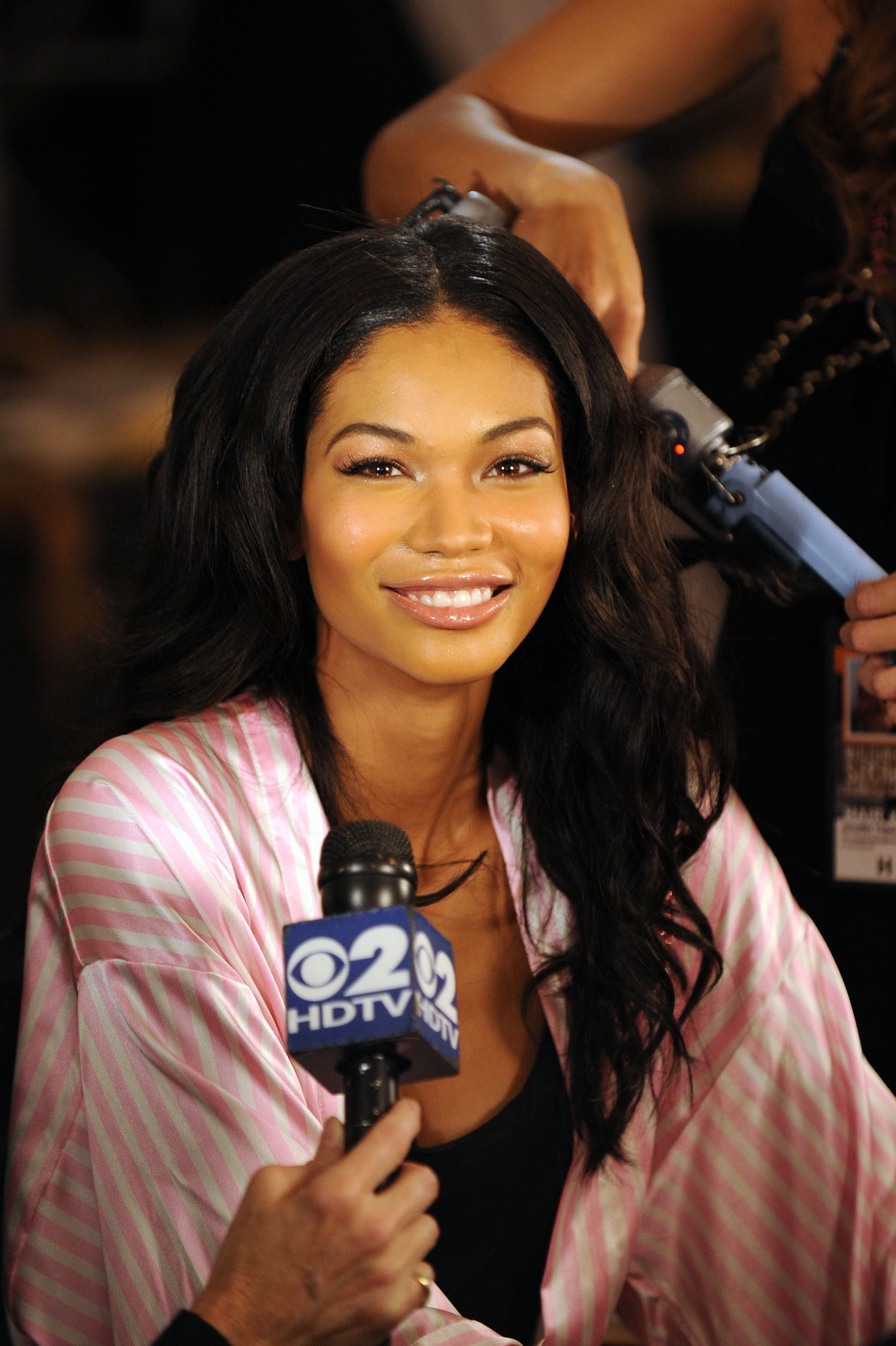
Victoria's Secrets 2010 Angels Campaign (left to right in each row) Adriana Lima, Alessandra Ambrosio, Behati Prinsloo, Candice Swanepoel, Rosie Huntington-Whiteley, Lily Aldridge, Erin Heatherton, and Chanel Iman. Also included for the brand Karolina Kurkova & Lindsay Ellingson & Katsia Zingarevich.

The Victoria's Secret Fashion Show is an annual fashion show sponsored by Victoria's Secret, a brand of lingerie and sleepwear. Victoria's Secret uses the show to promote and market its goods in high-profile settings. The show features some of the world's leading fashion models, such as current Victoria's Secret Angels Adriana Lima, Alessandra Ambrosio, Behati Prinsloo, Candice Swanepoel, Rosie Huntington-Whiteley, Lily Aldridge, Erin Heatherton, and Chanel Iman. Miranda Kerr and Doutzen Kroes both missed this year's show due to their pregnancies.

The 15th fashion show featured some of the new Angels and also the returning Angels. There were special performances by Katy Perry & Akon.

Dates	Locations	Broadcaster	Viewers (millions)	Performers	Previous	Next
November 10, 2010 (recorded); November 30, 2010	New York City	CBS	10.45	Katy Perry & Akon	2009	2011

== Fashion show segments ==
=== Segment 1: Tough Love ===
Artist	Song	Status
(United Kingdom) Plan B	"Stay Too Long"	Remixed Recording

Nationality	Model	Wings	Runway Shows	Status
(Brazil) Brazilian	Adriana Lima		1999–2003 • 2005–2008 • 2010–2018 • 2024–2026	ʚĭɞ VS 2 Angel (2000–2018)
(United Kingdom) British	Lily Donaldson		2010–2016	✿
(Brazil) Brazilian	Alessandra Ambrosio		2000–2003 • 2005–2017 • 2024–2026	VS 2 Angel (2004–2017)
(Poland) Polish	Anja Rubik		2009–2011	
(Poland) Polish	Magdalena Frackowiak	꒰১ ໒꒱	2010 • 2012–2015	✿
(Belarus) Belarusian	Maryna Linchuk		2008–2011 • 2013	
(United Kingdom) British	Rosie Huntington-Whiteley	꒰১ ໒꒱	2006–2010 • 2026	New VS 4 Angel (2010–2011)
(Germany) German	Julia Stegner		2005–2011	
(South Africa) South African	Candice Swanepoel		2007–2015 • 2017–2018 • 2024–2026	New VS 4 Angel (2010–2021)

=== Special Performance ===
Artist	Song	Status
(United States) Katy Perry	"Firework"	Live Performance

=== Segment 2: Game On ===
This segment was swapped in order of appearance with the third segment, Country Girls, in the edited TV version.

Artist	Song	Status
(United States) Lady Gaga	"Bad Romance"	Remixed Recording
(United States) LL Cool J	"Mama Said Knock You Out"	Remixed Recording
(United States) Survivor	"Eye of the Tiger"	Remixed Recording

Nationality	Model	Wings	Runway Shows	Status
(United States) American	Erin Heatherton		2008–2013	New VS 4 Angel (2010–2013)
(Brazil) Brazilian	Izabel Goulart	꒰১ ໒꒱	2005–2016	Former VS 3 Angel (2005–2008)
(United States) American	Chanel Iman		2009–2011	New VS 4 Angel (2010–2012)
(Czech Republic) Czech	Karolína Kurková		2000–2008 • 2010	ʚĭɞ Former VS 3 Angel (2005–2009)
(Brazil) Brazilian	Lais Ribeiro	꒰১ ໒꒱	2010–2011 • 2013–2018	✿
(Namibia) Namibian	Behati Prinsloo		2007–2015 • 2018 • 2024–2026	VS 3 (2009–2019) PINK (2008–2011) Angel
(Brazil) Brazilian	Adriana Lima		1999–2003 • 2005–2008 • 2010–2018 • 2024–2026	ʚĭɞ VS 2 Angel (2000–2018)
(China) Chinese	Liu Wen	꒰১ ໒꒱	2009–2012 • 2016–2018 • 2024–2026	
(United States) American	Shannan Click		2008–2011	
(Brazil) Brazilian	Isabeli Fontana		2003 • 2005 • 2007–2010 • 2012 • 2014 • 2024	

=== Segment 3: Country Girls ===
This segment was swapped in order of appearance with the second segment, Game On, in the edited TV version.

Artist	Song	Status
(United States) Jewel	"What You Are"	Recording

Nationality	Model	Wings	Runway Shows	Status
(South Africa) South African	Candice Swanepoel		2007–2015 • 2017–2018 • 2024–2026	New VS 4 Angel (2010–2021)
(Lithuania) Lithuanian	Edita Vilkevičiūtė	꒰১ ໒꒱	2008–2010	
(United Kingdom) British	Rosie Huntington-Whiteley		2006–2010 • 2026	New VS 4 Angel (2010–2011)
(Brazil) Brazilian	Alessandra Ambrosio		2000–2003 • 2005–2017 • 2024–2026	VS 2 Angel (2004–2017)
(United States) American	Lindsay Ellingson	꒰১ ໒꒱	2007–2014	✄┈
(United States) American	Lily Aldridge	꒰১ ໒꒱	2009–2017 • 2025	New VS 4 Angel (2010–2018)
(Canada) Canadian	Jessica Stam	꒰১ ໒꒱	2006–2007 • 2010	ʚĭɞ
(Belarus) Belarusian	Maryna Linchuk		2008–2011 • 2013	
(France) French	Constance Jablonski		2010–2015	✿
(Brazil) Brazilian	Gracie Carvalho		2010 • 2015	✿
(Russia) Russian	Anne Vyalitsyna	꒰১ ໒꒱	2008 • 2010–2011	ʚĭɞ

=== Segment 4: Heavenly Bodies ===
Artist	Song	Status
(Senegal) Akon	"Angel"	Live Performance

Nationality	Model	Wings	Runway Shows	Status	Fantasy Bra	Price
(United States) American	Chanel Iman	꒰১ ໒꒱	2009–2011	New VS 4 Angel (2010–2012)		
(Poland) Polish	Magdalena Frackowiak		2010 • 2012–2015	✿		
(United Kingdom) British	Lily Donaldson	꒰১ ໒꒱	2010–2016	✿		
(Poland) Polish	Anja Rubik	꒰১ ໒꒱	2009–2011			
(Brazil) Brazilian	Izabel Goulart		2005–2016	Former VS 3 Angel (2005–2008)		
(Belarus) Belarusian	Katsia Zingarevich		2010	✿		
(Brazil) Brazilian	Martha Streck		2010	✿		
(Brazil) Brazilian	Flávia de Oliveira		2006–2008 • 2010–2011	ʚĭɞ		
(Brazil) Brazilian	Adriana Lima	꒰১ ໒꒱	1999–2003 • 2005–2008 • 2010–2018 • 2024–2026	ʚĭɞ VS 2 Angel (2000–2018)	Bombshell Fantasy Bra	$2,000,000
(South Africa) South African	Candice Swanepoel	꒰১ ໒꒱	2007–2015 • 2017–2018 • 2024–2026	New VS 4 Angel (2010–2021)		
(Germany) German	Julia Stegner		2005–2011			

=== Segment 5: Wild Things ===
Artist	Song	Status
(United States) Thirty Seconds to Mars	"Vox Populi"	Recording

Nationality	Model	Wings	Runway Shows	Status
(Brazil) Brazilian	Alessandra Ambrosio	꒰১ ໒꒱	2000–2003 • 2005–2017 • 2024–2026	VS 2 Angel (2004–2017)
(United Kingdom) British	Rosie Huntington-Whiteley		2006–2010 • 2026	New VS 4 Angel (2010–2011)
(United States) American	Erin Heatherton	꒰১ ໒꒱	2008–2013	New VS 4 Angel (2010–2013)
(Cayman Islands) Caymanian	Selita Ebanks		2005–2010	Former VS 3 Angel (2005–2009)
(Brazil) Brazilian	Lais Ribeiro	꒰১ ໒꒱	2010–2011 • 2013–2018	✿
(Brazil) Brazilian	Emanuela de Paula		2008 • 2010–2011	ʚĭɞ
(Brazil) Brazilian	Isabeli Fontana		2003 • 2005 • 2007–2010 • 2012 • 2014 • 2024	
(Russia) Russian	Anne Vyalitsyna		2008 • 2010–2011	ʚĭɞ
(China) Chinese	Liu Wen		2009–2012 • 2016–2018 • 2024–2026	
(Sweden) Swedish	Caroline Winberg		2005–2011	
(Czech Republic) Czech	Karolína Kurková	꒰১ ໒꒱	2000–2003 • 2005–2008 • 2010	ʚĭɞ Former VS 3 Angel (2005–2009)

=== Segment 6: PINK ===
Artist	Song	Status
(United States) Katy Perry	"Teenage Dream" • "Hot N Cold" • "California Gurls"	Live Performance • Medley

Nationality	Model	Wings	Runway Shows	Status
(Namibia) Namibian	Behati Prinsloo	꒰১ ໒꒱	2007–2015 • 2018 • 2024–2026	VS 3 (2009–2019) PINK (2008–2011) Angel
(Canada) Canadian	Jessica Stam		2006–2007 • 2010	ʚĭɞ
(United States) American	Lindsay Ellingson		2007–2014	✄┈
(Lithuania) Lithuanian	Edita Vilkevičiūtė		2008–2010	
(United States) American	Shannan Click		2008–2011	
(France) French	Héloïse Guérin		2010	✿
(Brazil) Brazilian	Fabiana Semprebom		2010	
(Belarus) Belarusian	Maryna Linchuk	꒰১ ໒꒱	2008–2011 • 2013	
(United States) American	Jacquelyn Jablonski		2010–2015	✿
(United States) American	Lily Aldridge	꒰১ ໒꒱	2009–2017 • 2025	New VS 4 Angel (2010–2018)
(France) French	Constance Jablonski		2010–2015	✿
(United States) American	Chanel Iman	꒰১ ໒꒱	2009–2011	New VS 4 Angel (2010–2012)

== Finale ==
Artist	Song	Status
(United Kingdom) Muse	"Uprising"	Recording

Model	Runway Shows	Status	Model	Runway Shows	Status
(United Kingdom) Rosie Huntington–Whiteley	2006–2010 • 2026	New VS 4 Angel (2010–2011)	(Brazil) Adriana Lima	1999–2003 • 2005–2008 • 2010–2018 • 2024–2026	ʚĭɞ VS 2 Angel (2000–2018)
(Namibia) Behati Prinsloo	2007–2015 • 2018 • 2024–2026	VS 3 (2009–2019) PINK (2008–2011) Angel	(Brazil) Alessandra Ambrosio	2000–2003 • 2005–2017 • 2024–2026	VS 2 Angel (2004–2017)
(United States) Lily Aldridge	2009–2017 • 2025	New VS 4 Angel (2010–2018)	(South Africa) Candice Swanepoel	2007–2015 • 2017–2018 • 2024–2026	New VS 4 Angel (2010–2021)
(United States) Chanel Iman	2009–2011	New VS 4 Angel (2010–2012)	(United States) Erin Heatherton	2008–2013	New VS 4 Angel (2010–2013)
(Belarus) Maryna Linchuk	2008–2011 • 2013		(Czech Republic) Karolina Kurkova	2000–2008 • 2010	ʚĭɞ Former VS 3 Angel (2005–2009)
(United States) Shannan Click	2008–2011		(Cayman Islands) Selita Ebanks	2005–2010	Former VS 3 Angels (2005–2009)
(Canada) Jessica Stam	2006–07 • 2010	ʚĭɞ	(Brazil) Izabel Goulart	2005–2016	Former VS 3 Angels (2005–2009)
(United States) Lindsay Ellingson	2007–2014	✄┈	(Brazil) Lais Ribeiro	2010–2011 • 2013–2018	✿
(Poland) Magdalena Frackowiak	2010–2015	✿	(Sweden) Caroline Winberg	2005–2011	
(Belarus) Katsia Zingarevich	2010	✿	(China) Liu Wen	2009–2012 • 2016–2018 • 2024–2026	
(Lithuania) Edita Vilkeviciute	2008–2010		(Russia) Anne Vyalitsyna	2008 • 2010–2011	ʚĭɞ
(France) Heloise Guerin	2010	✿	(Brazil) Isabeli Fontana	2003 • 2005 • 2007–2010 • 2012 • 2014 • 2024	
(France) Constance Jablonski	2010–2015	✿	(Poland) Anja Rubik	2009–2011	
(United States) Jacquelyn Jablonski	2010–2015	✿	(Brazil) Flavia de Oliveira	2006–2008 • 2010–2011	ʚĭɞ
(Brazil) Fabiana Semprebom	2010	✿	(United Kingdom) Lily Donaldson	2010–2016	✿
(Brazil) Martha Streck	2010	✿	(Brazil) Emanuela de Paula	2008 • 2010–2011	
(Germany) Julia Stegner	2005–2011		(Brazil) Gracie Carvalho	2010 • 2015	✿

== Index ==
Symbol	Meaning
VS 2	2nd Generation Angels
VS 3	3rd Generation Angels
VS 4	4th Generation Angels
PINK	PINK Angels
★	Star Billing
ʚĭɞ	Comeback Models
✄┈	Fit Models
✿	Debuting Models
꒰১ ໒꒱	Wings
˚₊‧꒰ა ໒꒱ ‧₊˚	Swarovski Wing
