= Julia Stegner =

German supermodel (born 1984)

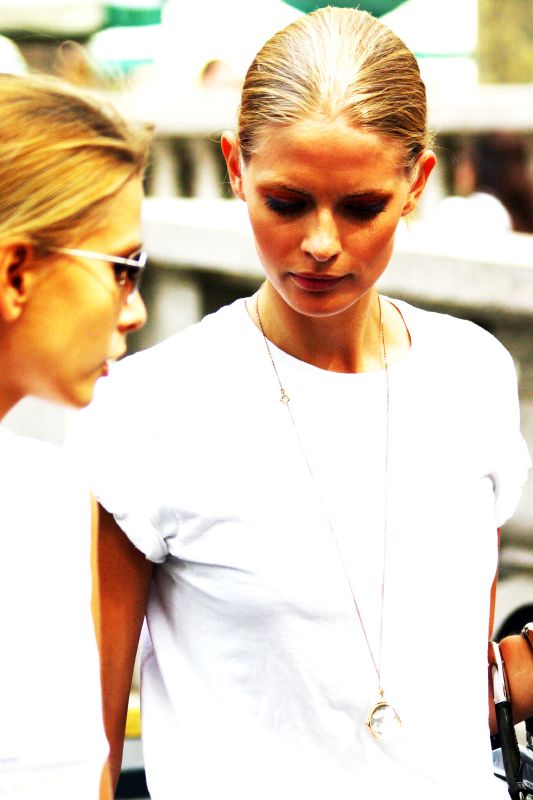
- Stegner in 2007
- Born: 2 November 1984 (age 41); Munich, West Germany
- Spouse: Benjamin Horne (m. 2014)
- Children: 1
- Modeling information
- Height: 1.83 m (6 ft 0 in)
- Hair color: Blonde
- Eye color: Green
- Agency: Elite Model Management (New York); Marilyn Agency (Paris); Women Management (Milan); Storm Model Management (London); Traffic Models (Barcelona); Unique Models (Copenhagen); Louisa Models (Munich)

Julia Stegner (born 2 November 1984) is a German supermodel. Throughout her whole career Stegner has appeared on the cover of international Vogue, 27 times. Stegner is one of the most successful German supermodels and was listed by Forbes as one of the highest paid models in 2010.

== Early life ==
Stegner was born in Munich, the daughter of Günter Stegner, the Director Central and Eastern Europe for LSI Corporation, and Erika Stegner, an accountant. She was raised in an animal-loving household with many dogs alongside her older sister Jeanette, who currently works in film production. For seven years, she was a child model, appearing in commercials and children's catalogs, and for nine years was trained in dance.

In high school, Stegner discovered a passion for playing basketball, and eventually she joined a club team in Munich. Being 182 centimetres tall by that time, she was naturally fit for the sport; her classmates even called her "Beanpole" because of her towering height.

Shortly before her 15th birthday, while celebrating Oktoberfest in her hometown, Stegner was discovered by Louisa von Minckwitz of Louisa Models. Tilla Lindig, a Munich and London based couture label first booked her. Although planning to study accounting when she left high school, Stegner moved to Paris to pursue modeling afterwards instead.

== Career ==
=== Early Work 2000-2003 ===
In Paris, Stegner made her first major cover appearance, for Elle magazine. She was eventually signed by Supreme Management and, within four months, she opened the fall 2003 Yves Saint Laurent show and then was part of the advertising campaign photographed shot by Craig McDean. Just a few weeks later, Stegner was shot by Steven Meisel for the 2 covers of Vogue Italia. That season Stegner walked 70 fashion shows.

In 2003, she did Strenesse and Sportmax campaigns, among others and appeared on the cover of Vogue (French, Italian, Nippon, and German editions).

=== Rise to prominence 2004-present ===
By the summer 2004, Stegner had done advertisement work for Celine, Yves Saint Laurent, Dolce & Gabbana, Ralph Lauren, and Dior. She also has been the Hugo Boss house model for several seasons. Stegner has appeared in a 2005 campaign for French fashion house Chloé and shows such as Anna Sui, Shiatzy Chen, Lanvin, Gucci, Versace and Valentino. She walked for Stella McCartney in autumn 2004. She also appeared in the 2005, 2006, 2007, 2008, 2009, 2010, and 2011 Victoria's Secret Fashion Shows.

Stegner also modeled for the 2005 Pirelli Calendar, where she appeared half-nude. Stegner has done print and runway work for the fur industry, wearing fur clothing for American Legend Minks and others. In 2005 she entered the BBDO which determined the value of the models, Stegner came after Karolina Kurkova with a market value of 36.5 millions and this was the second place.

She has been the face of Aquascutum, Guerlain KissKiss, Hugo Boss Eyewear and the Hugo Boss perfume, and Femme. In 2008, she became a face of Maybelline and Gianfranco Ferré. In 2009 she became the new face of Mercedes-Benz advertising.

Stegner returned to the runways in 2022 walking for Carolina Herrera and in 2023 walking for Isabel Marant F/W 2023 show. She was also part of the Mango and Victoria Beckham advertising campaigns as well.

== Personal life ==
Stegner married Australian photographer Benny Horne in 2014. They had been dating since 2009. In May 2014, shortly after their wedding, Stegner gave birth to their daughter.
