= Hana Soukupová =

Czech model (born 1985)

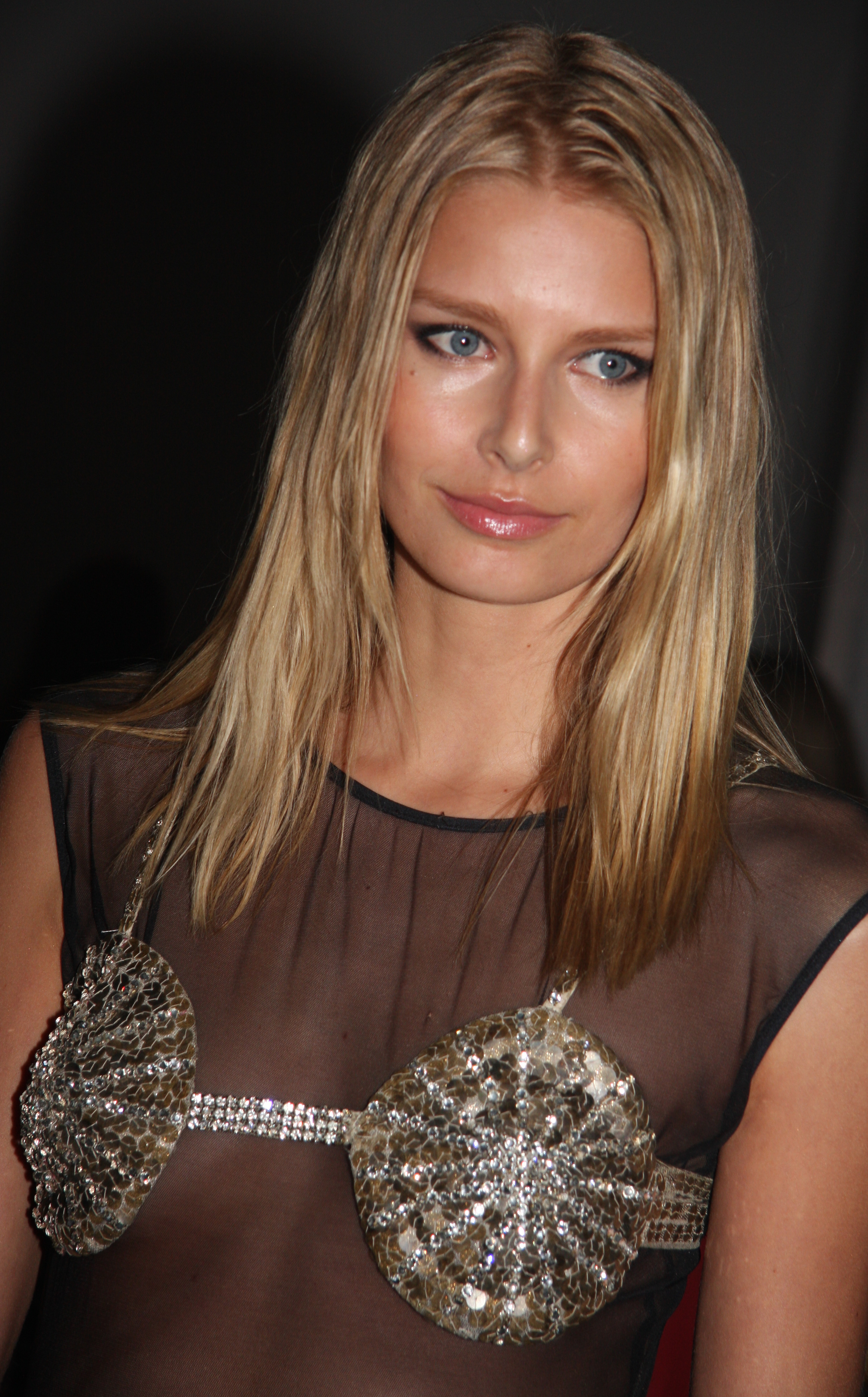
- Soukupová in June 2009
- Born: 18 December 1985 (age 40); Karlovy Vary, Czechoslovakia
- Children: 3
- Modeling information
- Height: 1.85 m (6 ft 1 in)
- Hair color: Blonde
- Eye color: Blue
- Agency: One Management (New York, Barcelona); Marilyn Agency (Paris); Why Not Model Management (Milan); The Squad (London); View Management (Barcelona); Donna Models (Tokyo)

Hana Soukupová (born 18 December 1985) is a Czech model. She has participated in the Victoria's Secret Fashion Shows and modelled for the Victoria's Secret catalog.

== Early life ==
Soukupová was born on 18 December 1985 in Karlovy Vary, Czechoslovakia (now the Czech Republic).

== Modeling career ==
Soukupová began to work as a model in Prague in 1998. She signed her first major modeling contract at 15 years of age as the face of Carolina Herrera's Chic perfume.

In September 2004, Soukupová was selected as one of only nine models on the cover of American Vogue photographed by Steven Meisel in an issue that compared supermodels today to supermodels of the 80s and 90s heyday. The other models she shared the cover with were Gisele Bündchen, Natalia Vodianova, Karolína Kurková, Daria Werbowy, Isabeli Fontana, Liya Kebede, Gemma Ward, and Karen Elson.

One year later, in 2005 Vanity Fair included her in the April issue shot by Patrick Demarchelier with Natalia Vodianova, Carmen Kass, Karolina Kurkova, Euguenia Volodina, Marija Vujovic, Natasha Poly, Valentina Zelyaeva, and Inguna Butane as "The New Beauties".

Since her career started, she has been featured on more than 100 magazine covers including international editions of Vogue, Harper's Bazaar, Elle, and Marie Claire. Soukupová's work can be seen in over 5,000 pages of editorial fashion stories and advertising campaigns. Soukupová has worked with international photographers like Steven Meisel, Annie Leibovitz, Peter Lindbergh, Nick Knight, Inez & Vinoodh, Mario Sorrenti, David Lachapelle, Mert & Marcus, Steven Klein, Mario Testino, and Patrick Demarchelier.

Soukupová has walked in over 500 runway fashion shows, including the Victoria's Secret shows and opening and closing shows for fashion icons including Alexander McQueen, Zac Posen, Gucci, Galliano, Dior, Calvin Klein, Karl Lagerfeld, Dolce & Gabbana, and Valentino. Soukupová's other runway credits include Chanel, Dior, Marc Jacobs, Louis Vuitton, Versace, Ralph Lauren, Donna Karan, Missoni, Alexander McQueen, Hermes, Balenciaga, Fendi, Michael Kors, Valentino, Cavalli, Chloé, Gucci, Anna Sui, and Zac Posen.

In 2017, Donatella Versace invited Soukupová to open the Versace Ready to Wear Fall Winter Show at Milan Fashion Week.

Soukupová has modeled for Gucci, BVLGARI, Escada, Balenciaga, Max Mara, Dior, Carolina Herrera, H&M, Victoria's Secret, and Versace. She has been the face of Gucci, Gucci Envy, Escada, Dior, Versace, St. John, Carolina Herrera, Bvlgari, and GAP. She shot her first international television commercial winning a CLIO award for Mattoni, a European luxury bottled water brand.

For a period of 37 consecutive months, Soukupová held the position of #3 in the world, according to models.com's official ranking of top female models.

== Charity ==
Soukupová is a member of ASPCA, the American Society for the Prevention of Cruelty to Animals. She has been involved with charity DKMS as a supporter for the Global Organization's fight against Blood Cancer. She is committed to various organizations and institutions related to supporting Woman Power, Contemporary Art and sustainable design innovations along with Be Charity, assisting sick children. She has maintained an active role with EcoStyle, an international organization dedicated to environmentally friendly fashion which showcase eco-conscious.

== Personal life ==
Soukupová married American business entrepreneur, Drew Aaron, who she met at a gallery opening in New York. Modern Painters magazine included them in the top 50 under 50 art collectors in the world. Their various homes and art collection have been featured in international publications, including Elle Decor and Architectural Digest. The couple got married in 2006 and separated in 2024.
