= Marilyn Agency =

French modeling agency

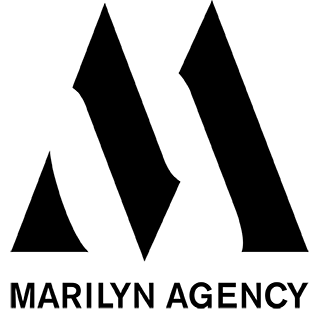
Logo of Marylin agency

Marilyn Agency is a French modeling agency established in Paris in 1985 by Marilyn Gauthier.

== History ==
Marilyn Agency was founded in Paris by Marilyn Gauthier in 1985. In 1992, the agency added a men's division, and in 1997 the agency expanded to New York City, founding Marilyn Model Management.

Marilyn Gauthier sold the company in 2012. The company is currently owned by billionaire Marie Halley, heir to the Carrefour supermarkets group.

Marilyn Agency is divided into two departments: MGM and Marilyn Paris/NY. In 2015, the French branch of the company had reported a workforce of 30 employees. In 2015, the French office had a turnover decrease of 34.44% compared to 2014, with a turnover of €9.3 million. It booked a net loss of €1.9 million in 2014, and €525,000 in 2015. In April 2016, the company relocated its Parisian office to 11 Rue Portefoin.

Marilyn Agency currently represents a multitude of different models including Claudia Schiffer, Julia Stegner, Shannan Click, Alex Lundqvist, Marlon Teixeira, Francisco Lachowski, Fernando Cabral, Erik van Gils, Alpha Did, and Sam Way.

The agency has previously represented supermodels including Kate Moss, Naomi Campbell, Eva Herzigova, Claudia Schiffer, and Missy Rayder.

== Controversies ==
In September 2016, Marilyn Agency was penalized for illegal price-fixing by the French Competition Authority along with 36 other model agencies. Marilyn Agency was the most heavily penalized, with a fine of €600,000. Agency fines were determined based on the gravity of their practices and the damage caused to the economy.

== See also ==
- List of modeling agencies
