= Louisa Models =

German modeling agency

Louisa Models is Germany's biggest model agency. It was established by Louisa von Minckwitz in Munich in 1981. A subsidiary was established in Hamburg in 1990. Only 11 years later since establishing, in 1992, the company was known as the leading model agency of Germany and has been in this top position ever since.

Louisa Models represent over 380 women and 250 men including Catherine Flemming, Erol Sander, Christiane Paul, Andrea Kempter, Monica Bellucci, Cleo von Adelsheim, Elle Macpherson, Izabel Goulart, Milla von Krockow, Daniela Pestova, Eva Padberg und Valerie Niehaus. Julia Stegner was discovered by Louisa von Minckwitz at the age of 14 at the Oktoberfest in Munich in 1999 and started her career there. Jana Beller has signed a contract in 2011.

== See also ==
- List of modeling agencies
