= Ajuma Nasenyana =

Kenyan model

Ajuma Nasanyana
- Born: Ajuma Nasanyana; January 14, 1985 (age 41); Lodwar, Kenya
- Modeling information
- Height: 1.78 m (5 ft 10 in)
- Hair color: Black
- Eye color: Brown
- Agency: City Models (Paris)

Ajuma Nasanyana is a Kenyan model. She has worked with Victoria's Secret and Carlos Mienes, among other designers.

== Biography ==
Nasanyana is a fashion model born in the town of Lodwar, situated in the Turkana District of Kenya.

Her first foray into modeling was in the Miss Tourism Kenya competition in 2003, where she was crowned Miss Nairobi. It was through this competition that she came to the attention of Lyndsey McIntyre of Surazuri Modeling Agency.

Soon afterward, Gamma Photo Agency came to Kenya to do a story on McIntyre's scouting work and were so taken with Nasenyana that she became the main feature of the story; which later ran in France's Gala magazine. The pictures taken were compiled into a portfolio and presented to international agency Ford Models, who entered her in Ford's Supermodel of the World competition.

In November 2003, Nasanyana traveled to Europe to build her portfolio prior to the Supermodel finals in New York City. She soon signed with agencies in London, Italy, Austria, Spain, Ireland, Canada and Sweden.

Nasanyana participated in the New York Fashion Week alongside Naomi Campbell and Alek Wek for designers such as Baby Phat and Carlos Mienes before traveling to Milan to model for fashion houses such as Ungaro during the Italian Fashion Week. Paris was the final destination during the winter show season and British designer Vivienne Westwood made her the lead model in her show.

Since then, Nasanyana has shot several magazine editorials, a video for Lacoste, and a catalogue for Issey Miyake.

In 2011, she was also named AFI African Fashion International's, Africa Fashion Week Model of the Year 2012.

Besides modeling, Nasanyana has decried the apparent trend in her native Kenya toward rejection of the indigenous Black African physical standards of beauty in favour of those of other communities. In an interview with the Kenyan broadsheet the Daily Nation, she stated that "it seems that the world is conspiring in preaching that there is something wrong with Kenyan ladies' kinky hair and dark skin[...] Their leaflets are all about skin lightening, and they seem to be doing good business in Kenya. It just shocks me. It's not OK for a Caucasian to tell us to lighten our skin[...] I have never attempted to change my skin. I am natural. People in Europe and America love my dark skin. But here in Kenya, in my home country, some consider it not attractive."

As a remedy, Nasanyana has contemplated launching a cosmetic and natural skincare line for women like herself. She hopes that her products will inspire her contemporaries to love their own appearance instead of attempting to alter it through artificial means, such as by skin bleaching.
