= Selita Ebanks =

Caymanian model

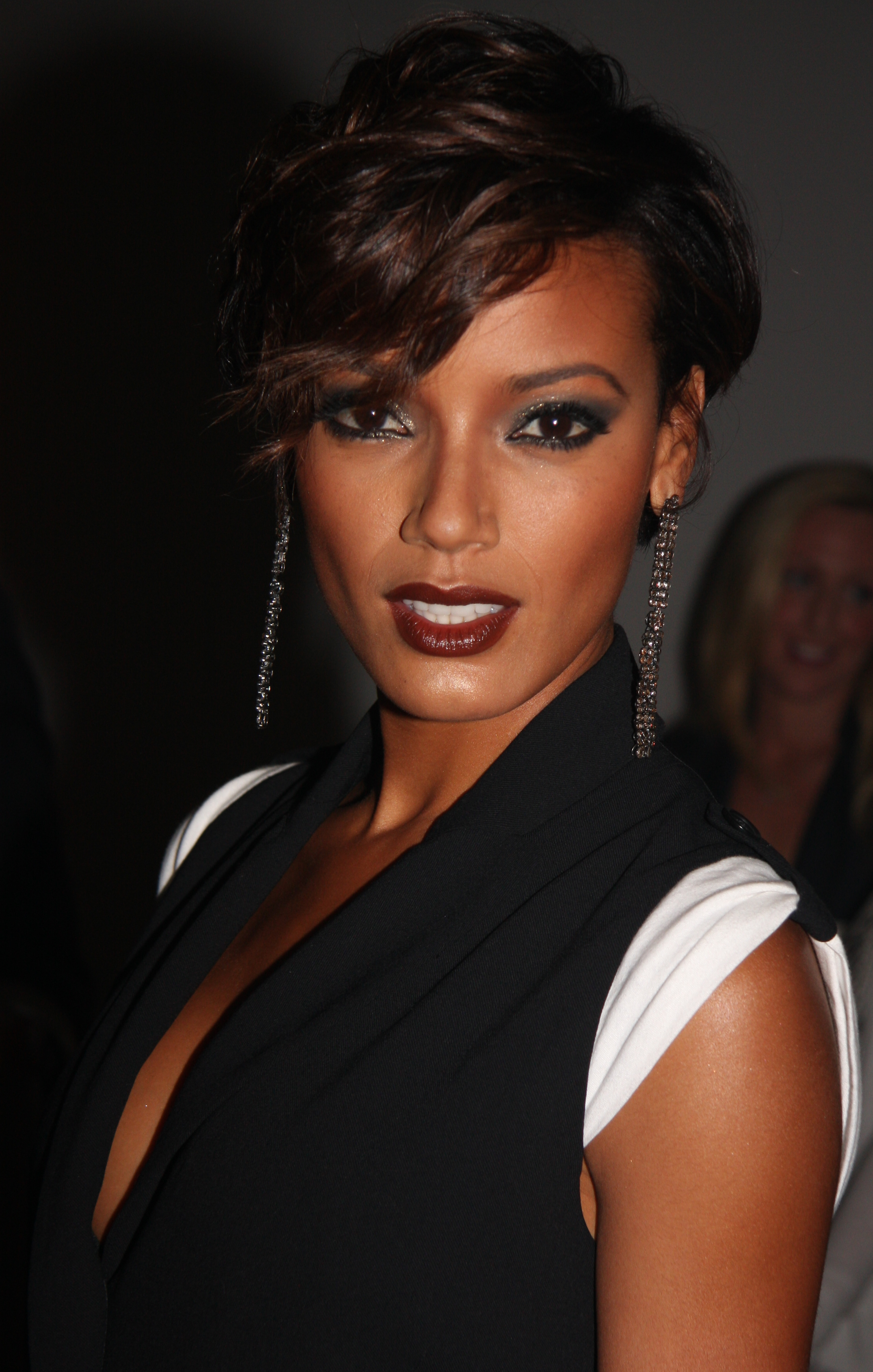
- Ebanks in 2009
- Born: 17 February 1983 (age 43); George Town, Cayman Islands
- Years active: 2001–2012
- Modeling information
- Height: 5 ft 9 1/2 in (1.77 m)
- Hair color: Brown
- Eye color: Brown
- Agency: Elite Model Management (Amsterdam); Traffic Models (Barcelona); Place Models (Hamburg); Two Management (Los Angeles); MP MEGA MIAMI (Miami Beach)

Selita Ebanks (born 17 February 1983) is a Caymanian model. She was a Victoria's Secret Angel from 2005 to 2010. She has also worked for high fashion brands Neiman Marcus and Ralph Lauren, and appeared in magazines such as the Sports Illustrated Swimsuit Issue, Vogue, and Glamour.

== Early life ==
Born to a Jamaican father and a Caymanian mother in George Town, Grand Cayman, Ebanks was raised in a large family that included seven brothers. Her family, her mother in particular, encouraged her development through extracurricular programs. She moved to the United States and settled in St. George, Staten Island, where she graduated from Curtis High School. She was accepted to attend undergraduate studies at Columbia University and New York University, but instead chose to pursue modeling. In 2000, at the age of 17, while walking through the turnstiles at Six Flags Great Adventure, Ebanks was scouted by an agent from Elite Model Management.

== Career ==
=== Modelling ===
Ebanks is widely recognized as one of the most prominent Black supermodels of her generation, known for her groundbreaking career in high-fashion and her role as a trailblazer for diversity in the fashion industry. Ebanks made her debut in February 2001 at the fall show for Tuleh, and has walked the runway for designers including Betsey Johnson, Catherine Malandrino, Pamella Roland and Tommy Hilfiger. She has appeared in campaigns for Abercrombie & Fitch, Tommy Hilfiger and DKNY, and signed a contract with Victoria's Secret in 2005.

Ebanks first modeled for Victoria's Secret for their Ipex Bra line, before being signed as an Angel. She and Izabel Goulart made their major débuts in the 2005 Victoria's Secret Fashion Show, working as an Angel until 2008. In 2005, Tyra Banks said she was proud of Ebanks to be representing black women at Victoria's Secret.

In 2007, Ebanks was selected to wear the "Very Sexy" Holiday Fantasy Bra Set with a price tag of $4,500,000 that contains diamonds, emeralds, rubies and yellow sapphires—which she wore in the Victoria's Secret "Christmas Dreams and Fantasies 2007" catalogue. She also wore the fantasy bra set during the Victoria's Secret fashion show on 4 December 2007.

Ebanks made a special guest appearance on How I Met Your Mother (episode: "The Yips") on 26 November 2007 with her fellow Victoria's Secret supermodels (Miranda Kerr, Heidi Klum, Adriana Lima, Marisa Miller, and Alessandra Ambrosio).

According to Forbes, Ebanks was the twelfth highest paid model of 2008, earning an estimated $2.7 million.

Ebanks has graced the covers of Maxim, British GQ and Russian FHM and appeared in editorials for Marie Claire, Glamour, V, German and Italian Elle, Vanidades and Sports Illustrated's 2007 Swimsuit Issue.

=== Other ventures ===
Ebanks appeared on the third season of Celebrity Apprentice, but was fired in week 5 on 11 April 2010, placing 9th. Previously, she recorded music and appeared on the UPN-series South Beach.

She is featured in The-Dream's music video for the single "Make Up Bag", as well as Kanye West's 2010 short film Runaway, playing a fallen phoenix with whom West's character falls in love. She is a recurring character in BET's Real Husbands of Hollywood, where she plays the love interest of comedian Kevin Hart. Ebanks also appeared in a commercial for State Farm Insurance alongside actor and model Mehcad Brooks.

Ebanks also has her own line of swimwear, accessories and shoes called Sass which stands for Selita's Accessories Shoes and Swimwear. The line was seen on the BET Rip the Runway 2012 which she hosted alongside Pooch Hall.

Ebanks was cast in the Freeform (formerly ABC Family) TV series Nicki, based on the life of Nicki Minaj, alongside Ariana Neal, Wesley Jonathan and McCarrie McCausland. Whoopi Goldberg and J. B. Smoove were announced as guest stars. According to The Hollywood Reporter, the series was cancelled by Freeform. Ebanks was to play Grace, Nicki's mother. Production began in January 2016. In October 2016, Minaj stated that filming had been postponed.

Ebanks was in MTV's Champs vs. Stars in 2018.

== Personal life ==
Ebanks was engaged to comedian Nick Cannon for five months.

She dated Terrence J from 2011 to 2013.

== Philanthropy ==
Ebanks has run her own talent school, "Stardom Youth Foundation" since 2004 in her hometown Cayman Islands, providing career guidance for teenagers.

She also formed a charity organization, "Women's Coalition for Empowerment and Opportunity", after a trip to Sierra Leone in 2008. The organization helps to support women's educational and professional programs in the civil war-torn African nation.

Ebanks joined the Cash & Rocket tour in 2013 and 2014, raising more than $1 million for women and children all over the world.

== Filmography ==
Year	Title	Role	Notes
2007	How I Met Your Mother	Herself	
2010	The Apprentice (U.S. season 9)	Herself	5 episodes
2010	Runaway (2010 film)	Phoenix	
2011	Hawaii Five-0	Lisa Cole	1 episode
2013	Real Husbands of Hollywood	Herself	7 episodes
2014	Catfish: The TV Show	Herself	1 episode
2017	Hip Hop Squares	Herself	2 episodes
2017	Uncorked	Herself	
2018	The Challenge: Champs vs. Stars (season 3)	Herself	
2024	Grand Cayman: Secrets In Paradise	Herself	
