= Victoria's Secret Fashion Show =

Fashion event (1995–present)

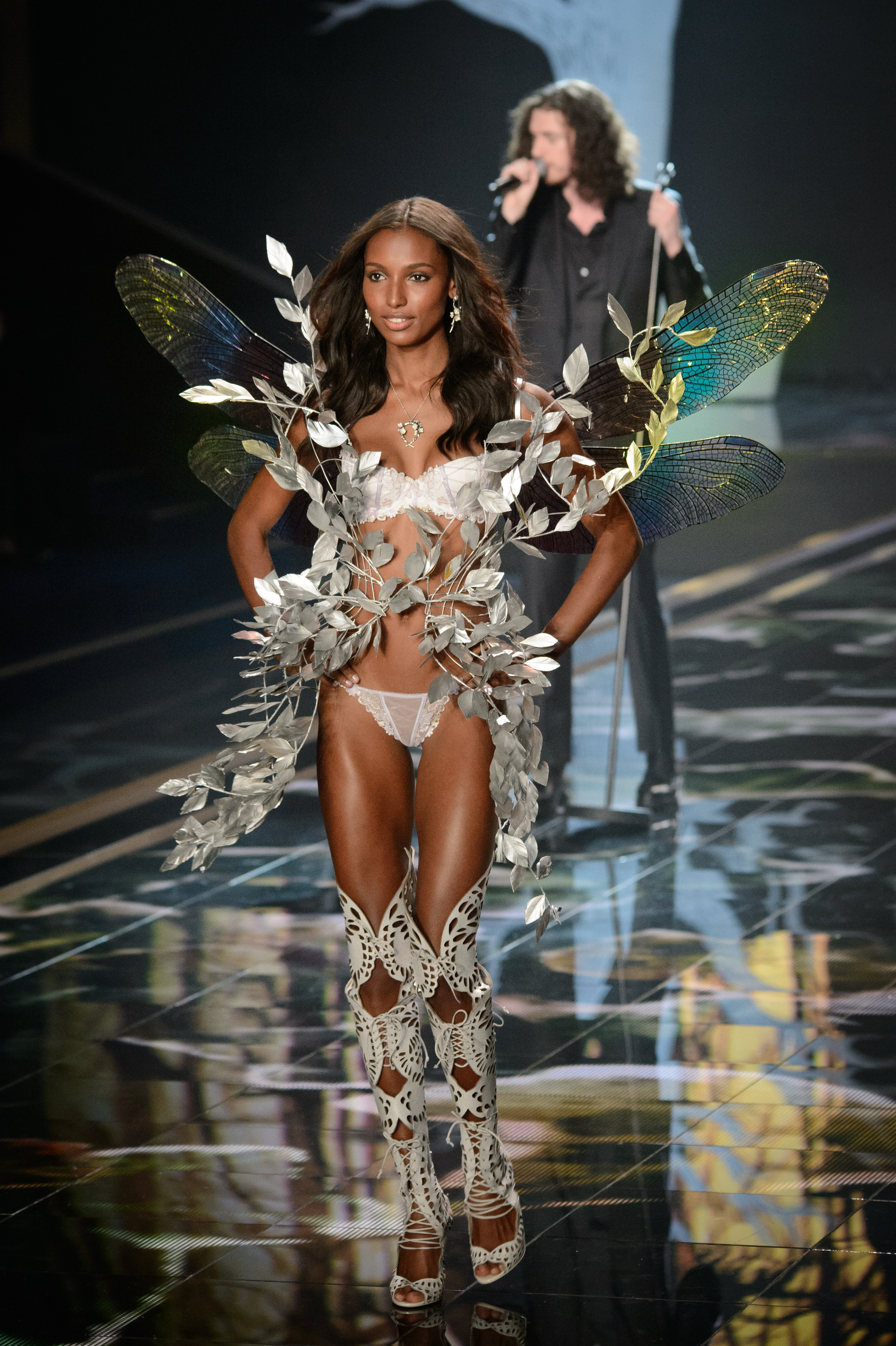
- Jasmine Tookes with Hozier at the 2014 Victoria's Secret Fashion Show
- Status: Active
- Genre: Fashion show
- Frequency: Annually
- Years active: 26 (Note: 1995–present; not held in 2004, 2019, 2020, 2021, 2022, or 2023)
- Inaugurated: August 1, 1995
- Founder: Edward Razek
- Organizer: Victoria's Secret
- Website: victoriassecret.com

The Victoria's Secret Fashion Show is an annual promotional event sponsored by and featuring Victoria's Secret, a brand of lingerie. From 1995 to 2026, Victoria's Secret used the show to market its goods in high-profile settings. Models under contract to the company, known as Victoria's Secret Angels, were key participants at the event. The fashion show was cancelled in 2019, the same year its organizer, Edward Razek, resigned under public pressure. In 2023, the brand introduced "The Tour '23," a reimagining of its fashion show presented as a documentary special in partnership with Amazon Prime Video. The runway show officially returned in 2024 with a revamped format reflecting the brand's contemporary identity.

The fashion show, at its peak viewership in 2001, had millions tuning in to watch and was known to be a lavish event with elaborate costumed lingerie, music by leading entertainers, and set design with changing themes. With dozens of the world's top fashion models selected to perform in it each year, the fashion show attracted celebrities, entertainers, and regularly featured special performers and acts.

American network television broadcast the Victoria's Secret Fashion Show during prime time. The first few shows in the 1990s were held in the days preceding Valentine's Day, linking the brand to the holiday's romantic theme. In 1999 and 2000, the show was webcast. Beginning in 2001, the event was shifted to take place ahead of the Christmas and holiday season. The show made its network television broadcast debut on ABC in 2001, with subsequent years (2002–2017) broadcast on CBS; the event returned to ABC for the final 2018 edition. The event was frequently held in New York City at the Plaza Hotel or the 69th Regiment Armory, in addition to special host cities including Miami, Los Angeles, Cannes, Paris, London, and Shanghai.

Cancellation, officially announced in November 2019 amid declining ratings and sales and growing criticism of Razek, was influenced by both the reckoning of the Me Too movement, fourth-wave feminism, and the association of L Brands' CEO Les Wexner with sex offender Jeffrey Epstein. Due to the immense amount of criticism, Victoria's Secret Fashion Show reconsidered its marketing strategy, which ultimately contributed to the end of the runway shows. The brand's focus changed to digital-platform marketing with the aim of restoring its reputation. Critics of the Victoria's Secret Fashion Show considered it objectifying, lacking in diversity of body sizes, and repeatedly inclined towards offensive cultural appropriation with its designs.

== History ==
=== 1995–2005 ===
The first fashion show, introduced by Stephanie Seymour, was held at the Plaza Hotel in New York City in August 1995. The show also featured Beverly Peele and Frederique van der Wal. The inaugural show occurred two months before The Limited, parent company of Victoria's Secret owner Intimate Brands, sold an initial public offering of a 16 percent stake in the company at the New York Stock Exchange (NYSE). Supermodel Stephanie Seymour rang the closing bell at the NYSE as part of the publicity campaign after the event had been promoted by full page adds in the Wall Street Journal. The subsequent three annual shows were also held at the Plaza Hotel.

In 1999, during Super Bowl XXXIII, Victoria's Secret announced a 72-hour countdown to the webcast of their fashion show, which resulted in over 2 million viewers. Parent company Intimate Brands bought a $1.5 million, 30-second television advertisement during the Super Bowl broadcast and spent an additional $4 million on international newspaper publicity. The event, hosted by Broadcast.com, featured Tyra Banks, Laetitia Casta, Heidi Klum, Karen Mulder, Daniela Peštová, Inés Rivero, and Seymour. In 1999 and 2000, the show was broadcast live on the internet.

The May 2000 fashion show, held in France in sync with the Cannes Film Festival, was made with production help from Harvey Weinstein. The event raised $3.5 million for the Cinema Against AIDS charity.

The 2001 show, hosted by Rupert Everett, returned to New York City and was held at Bryant Park in the Valhalla structure, designed by Rudi Enos. All proceeds went towards the victims of the September 11 attacks. That year, the show made its broadcast debut on ABC, drawing millions of viewers as well as some controversy; the Federal Communications Commission received many complaints about the broadcast.

From 2002 through 2005, it was held at the Lexington Avenue Armory in New York City.

The 2004 show was canceled due to fallout from the Super Bowl halftime show controversy, an event known for accidental indecency with a "wardrobe malfunction". In place of the fashion show, the company sent the Angels (Tyra Banks, Heidi Klum, Gisele Bündchen, Adriana Lima, and Alessandra Ambrosio) on an Angels Across America Tour in 2004 to promote the brand through visit to four major cities: New York City, Miami, Las Vegas, and Los Angeles.

=== 2006–2012 ===
Victoria's Secret sister brand PINK made its debut on the runway starting in 2006 and was regularly featured in a segment of the fashion show each year afterward.

In 2006 and 2007, the Victoria's Secret fashion shows were held at the Kodak Theatre in Los Angeles. On November 13, 2007, the company's Angels were honored with a star on the Hollywood Walk of Fame outside the Kodak Theatre as part of a celebration to mark Victoria's Secret's 25th anniversary on Hollywood Boulevard. Justin Timberlake opened the show with his song "Sexy Back". This fashion show included the final walk of Gisele Bündchen.

The 2007 show featured a performance by the Spice Girls, the first American TV debut of the band's comeback. After Kanye West canceled his appearance, will.i.am was called to perform in his place.

The 2008 show coincided with the grand re-opening of the Fontainebleau Miami Beach hotel and had Usher as a featured performer. Unlike the other shows, the runway was designed parallel with the audience seats.

In 2009, the fashion show returned to the Lexington Avenue Armory and featured the "Victoria's Secret Model Search", a competition to find a new runway Angel with the winner announced as Kylie Bisutti.

The 2010 Victoria's Secret Fashion show aired on November 30, 2010, on CBS, and featured performances by Katy Perry and Akon. A promotional ad featured a lipdub for Katy Perry's "Firework". As of 2010, 152 models have walked the show.

In 2011, Kanye West started his song "Stronger" with a tribute to his mother who had died before his scheduled performance four years before, saying: "In 2007, I was supposed to perform this song on this show... and I lost my superhero. Now she's my super-angel."

In 2012, an outfit worn by model Karlie Kloss, which was reminiscent of Native American attire, sparked controversy due to its alleged stereotypical depiction of Native Americans, which amounted to cultural appropriation. Victoria's Secret released a statement of apology shortly after, saying that they will remove it from future advertisements and the broadcast. Kloss apologized on her Twitter account for the outfit and expressed her support for the outfit's removal in the broadcast. Performers at VS 2012 include: Rihanna, Justin Bieber, and Bruno Mars.

=== 2013–2019 ===
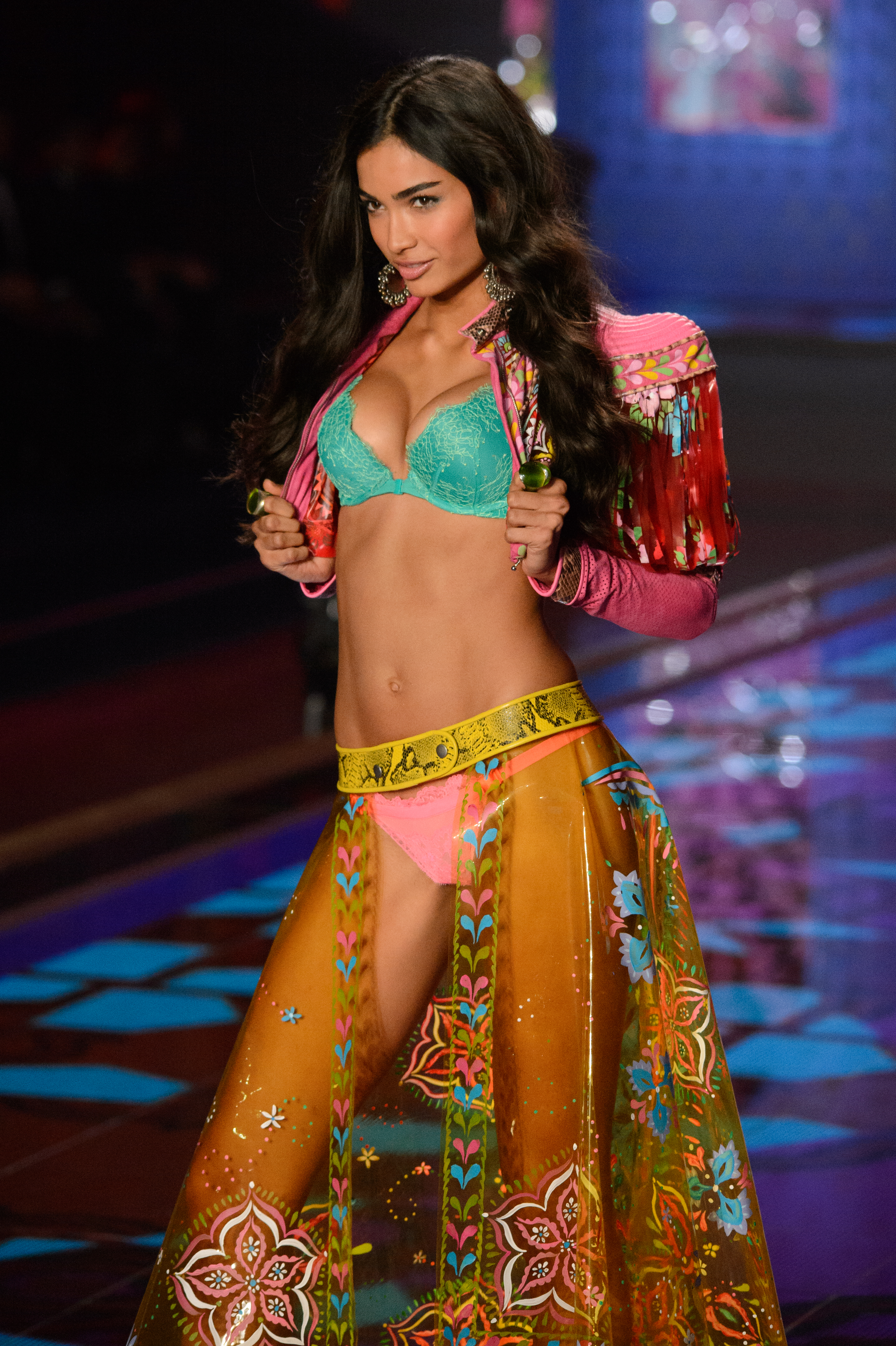
Kelly Gale wearing lingerie along with traditional-styled Indian clothing at Victoria's Secret Fashion Show 2014

The 2013 Victoria's Secret Fashion Show featured performances by Taylor Swift, A Great Big World, Neon Jungle, and Fall Out Boy. Swift performed "I Knew You Were Trouble", A Great Big World performed "Say Something", UK's Neon Jungle made their US television debut with "Trouble", and Fall Out Boy performed with Taylor Swift in "My Songs Know What You Did In The Dark" and later performed "The Phoenix".

In 2014, the Victoria's Secret Fashion show featured performances by Taylor Swift; Ed Sheeran, Ariana Grande, and Hozier. Swift performed "Blank Space" and "Style". Ed Sheeran performed "Thinking Out Loud". Ariana Grande performed "Love Me Harder", "Bang Bang", "Break Free", and "Problem". Hozier performed "Take Me to Church". During the show, Ariana Grande was performing and was hit by accident by Elsa Hosk's wings.

In 2015, the show featured performances by The Weeknd, Selena Gomez, and Ellie Goulding. The Weeknd performed "In the Night" and "Can't Feel My Face" for the show, while Gomez performed a medley of "Hands to Myself" and "Me & My Girls" for the PINK segment. Goulding was contracted as a replacement for Rihanna, who had canceled her appearance just one week before the show in order to focus on recording her album Anti. Goulding performed "Army" and "Love Me Like You Do" for the show.

In 2016, the Victoria's Secret Fashion show featured performances by The Weeknd (performed "Starboy"), Lady Gaga (performed "Million Reasons", plus a medley of "A-Yo" and "John Wayne"), and Bruno Mars (performed "Chunky" for the Pink brand and "24k Magic" for the VS brand). The executive producer of Victoria's Secret, Ed Razek, chose Grand Palais in Paris, France, as the show's location. A major challenge faced with the show was the size of the building and how the show could be showcased on a small TV, as well as the natural lighting in the building, which would get in the way of the tradition of the show being held at night.

The 2017 show was held in Shanghai, China and was the first Victoria's Secret Fashion Show to be held in Asia. The show featured the first-ever segment in collaboration with another brand, French fashion house Balmain. The theme and designs were co-steered by Victoria's Secret and Balmain creative director Olivier Rousteing. Performers included Harry Styles (performed Kiwi and Only Angel), Miguel (performed Pineapple Skies and Told You So), Jane Zhang (performed a medley of Work For It, 808, and Dust My Shoulders Off), and Leslie Odom Jr. (performed Winter Song). A performance by Katy Perry was canceled due to her visa to travel to China being revoked. A week before the show was due to be filmed, model Gigi Hadid stated that she had been denied access to the show. Russian models were also reportedly denied visas for entry to China.

In November 2018, the company's chief of marketing Ed Razek was criticized for comments he made in an interview with Vogue, suggesting that the fashion show did not cast trans women—whom he referred to using the now-rejected term "transsexuals"—because "the show is a fantasy". Razek apologized for the "insensitive" comments, noting that trans women have attempted to audition for the show in the past, but that "it was never about gender. I admire and respect their journey to embrace who they really are." Razek also faced criticism for similar comments regarding plus-size models, stating they had not attempted to do a show for them since 2000 since there was no viewer interest. Since then, ratings and viewership of the show dropped by a 0.9 rating and 3.3 million viewers. The number of viewers have been declining throughout the years as have the sales in store and online brands. Criticism of Razek for anachronistic and misogynistic business practices intensified, from both inside and outside the company, and he resigned in August 2019.

=== Discontinuation and spiritual successor ===
In May 2019, it was reported that L Brands CEO Les Wexner had issued a memo questioning the future of the show, stating that network television was no longer the "right fit", and that the company planned to focus on "developing exciting and dynamic content and a new kind of event." Viewership of the show had fallen from 9.2 million viewers in 2014 to 3.2 million in 2018. Victoria's Secret had also been experiencing an overall decline due to increasing competition, as well as changing perceptions to the company's marketing—which a retail analyst described as encouraging women to objectify themselves to "impress men".

On November 21, 2019, L Brands CFO Stuart Burgdoerfer officially confirmed that the 2019 fashion show had been canceled, citing its declining viewership and lack of immediate "material impact" on Victoria's Secret sales post-broadcast. He re-affirmed that Victoria's Secret was "figuring out how to advance the positioning of the brand and best communicate that to customers". The New York Times reported that the company was seeking to distance itself from the controversy following fallout from the Jeffrey Epstein sexual abuse scandal and Wexner's ties to Epstein. The last official broadcast of the Victoria's Secret Fashion Show was in December 2018.

On March 5, 2023, Victoria's Secret chief financial officer Tim Johnson stated during an earnings call that the company was planning a "new version" of the fashion show. In July 2023, Victoria's Secret announced that it was producing a documentary with Pulse Films, The Victoria's Secret World Tour, which premiered on September 26, 2023 on Amazon Prime Video. The special was billed as "part spectacular fashion event, part documentary", and followed the production of four Victoria's Secret curations in Bogotá, Lagos, London, and Tokyo. A World Tour fashion collection associated with the documentary was offered on Amazon and the Victoria's Secret website.

=== 2024–present: Return ===
On May 15, 2024, the brand announced via Instagram that the show would return in fall 2024. and on August 28, 2024, the city of New York was announced as the host city of the return of the show and Tyra Banks as the host. Valentina Sampaio and Alex Consani became the first two transgender models to walk in the show, which took place on October 15, 2024.

In 2025, Victoria’s Secret continued with another edition of the show. The show continued its focus on diversity, this time featuring the first professional athletes to walk the runway, Angel Reese and Sunisa Lee, and was once again held in New York City, its host city.

== Wings as a design element ==
The wings were first introduced in the 1998 Victoria's Secret Fashion Show. A consistent feature of each year's collection, wings were included as a part of some outfits. The idea to feature wings as part of the collection came in the wake of the immense success of the "Angels"-bra line, which was advertised with the models Tyra Banks, Helena Christensen, Karen Mulder, Daniela Pestova, and Stephanie Seymour wearing wings. When introduced, Tyra Banks was the first super model to wear the first Victoria’s Secret angel wings and Heidi Klum wore them for an extravaganza held from New York to Shanghai. The same models who were featured in the campaigns for the "Angel"-bra line, with the exception of Chandra North filling in the spot for Christensen, walked the runway with Angel wings on.. Over the years, the show featured various forms and sizes of wings, such as butterfly, peacock, or devil wings, which have become emblematic of the Victoria's Secret brand. The wings were, at times, ornamental back pieces worn by the models on the runway, with limited resemblance to traditional wings. Some models considered it an honor to wear the wings.

As of 2026, Adriana Lima has worn the most winged costumes in the history of the show, with 28 sets of wings. She is followed by Alessandra Ambrosio and Candice Swanepoel, who have each worn 22 pairs of wings.

== Critical review ==
The early webcasts were criticized for poor connection, and users that could connect were subjected to low video quality. One critic from The New York Times described the initial 20th-century webcast experience as having felt like he was "watching a striptease through a keyhole".

Some critics have described the 21st-century televised editions of the show as pornographic, while others have described it as both "outright commercialism" and indistinguishable from an infomercial. The Federal Communications Commission has received complaints regarding the broadcast, but no fines have been imposed, with the FCC, following the 2001 airing, citing the First Amendment and stating that "sexual or excretory activities or organs in a patently offensive manner as measured by contemporary community standards for the broadcast medium" were not broadcast. In the initial 2001 airing ABC blurred the screen on particularly sheer lingerie. This enabled the show to pass muster with its internal Broadcast Standards and Practices department and to achieve a TV Parental Guidelines rating of TV-14 (a rating maintained for each broadcast presentation over the years), as a TV-MA rating is virtually unmarketable for advertisers on broadcast television. In 2002, the National Organization for Women protested the show calling it a "soft-core porn infomercial". They were joined in protest by the Parents Television Council and other watchdog organizations. Despite the program's timeslot and parental ratings, some affiliates have chosen not to air the program, including Fisher Communications' CBS stations in Boise and Idaho Falls, Idaho, in the past. In 2009, the American Decency Association organized email letters of protests to sponsors of the show including AT&T, Kentucky Fried Chicken, Netflix, Nikon, and Reebok. CBS described the event as "the Super Bowl of fashion" in 2014.

== Summary table ==
#	Event	Dates	Locations	Broadcaster	Viewers (millions)	Models		Performers
#	Event	Dates	Locations	Broadcaster	Viewers (millions)	List	Ref.	Performers
1	Victoria's Secret Fashion Show 1995	August 1, 1995	Plaza Hotel, New York City, US	no broadcast	no broadcast	Angelika Kallio; Beverly Peele; Catherine McCord; Frederique van der Wal; Gail Elliott; Helena Barquilla; Ingrid Seynhaeve; Karen Alexander; Keri Claussen; Leilani Bishop; Magdalena Wróbel; Natane Adcock; Stephanie Seymour; Tricia Helfer; Valerie Jean Garduno; Veronica Webb		None
2	Victoria's Secret Fashion Show 1996	February 6, 1996	Plaza Hotel, New York City, US	no broadcast	no broadcast	Alice Dodd; Dana Douglas; Greta Cavazzoni; Keri Claussen; Magali Amadei; Catherine McCord; Frederique van der Wal; Helena Christensen; Karen Mulder; Ling Tan; Naomi Campbell; Rebecca Romijn; Saira Mohan; Stephanie Seymour; Tyra Banks; Veronica Webb; Yasmeen Ghauri		None
3	Victoria's Secret Fashion Show 1997	February 4, 1997	Plaza Hotel, New York City, US	no broadcast	no broadcast	Catherine McCord; Claudia Schiffer; Elsa Benítez; Esther Cañadas; Frederique van der Wal; Georgianna Robertson; Heidi Klum; Helena Christensen; Ingrid Seynhaeve; Karen Mulder; Keri Claussen; Laetitia Casta; Naomi Campbell; Rebecca Romijn; Stephanie Seymour; Tricia Helfer; Tyra Banks; Vendela Kirsebom; Yasmeen Ghauri		None
4	Victoria's Secret Fashion Show 1998	February 3, 1998	Plaza Hotel, New York City, US	no broadcast	no broadcast	Angelica Boss; Annie Morton; Astrid Muñoz; Bridget Hall; Carrie Salmon; Chandra North; Chrystele Saint Louis Augustin; Daniela Peštová; Eugenia Silva; Heather Payne; Heidi Klum; Inés Rivero; Irina Bondarenko; Jaime King; Karen Mulder; Keri Claussen; Laetitia Casta; Myka Dunkle; Naomi Campbell; Natane Adcock; Rebecca Romijn; Simone van Baal; Stephanie Seymour; Tricia Helfer; Tyra Banks; Valeria Mazza		None
5	Victoria's Secret Fashion Show 1999	February 3, 1999	Cipriani Wall Street restaurant, New York City, US	webcast by Broadcast.com	2.0+	Adriana Lima; Ana Cláudia Michels; Carmen Kass; Daniela Peštová; Elsa Benítez; Eugenia Silva; Eva Herzigová; Frankie Rayder; Gisele Bündchen; Heidi Klum; Hollyanne Leonard; Inés Rivero; Jaime King; Karen Mulder; Kiara Kabukuru; Kirsty Hume; Laetitia Casta; Leilani Bishop; Natane Adcock; Stephanie Seymour; Trish Goff; Tyra Banks		None
6	Victoria's Secret Fashion Show 2000	May 18, 2000	Cannes, France	webcast		Adriana Lima; Alessandra Ambrosio; Ana Cláudia Michels; Angela Lindvall; Aurélie Claudel; Carmen Kass; Caroline Ribeiro; Daniela Peštová; Danita Angell; Eva Herzigová; Fernanda Tavares; Frankie Rayder; Gisele Bündchen; Haylynn Cohen; Heidi Klum; Ingrid Seynhaeve; Inés Rivero; Karen Mulder; Karolína Kurková; Laetitia Casta; Mini Andén; Oluchi Onweagba; Rhea Durham; Stephanie Seymour; Trish Goff; Tyra Banks		None
7	Victoria's Secret Fashion Show 2001	November 13, 2001 aired: November 15, 2001	Bryant Park, New York City, US	ABC	12.4	Adriana Lima; Alek Wek; Alessandra Ambrosio; Anouck Lepere; Audrey Marnay; Aurélie Claudel; Bridget Hall; Caroline Ribeiro; Daniela Peštová; Diána Mészáros; Emma Heming; Eva Herzigová; Fernanda Tavares; Gisele Bündchen; Heidi Klum; Inés Rivero; Karen Elson; Karolína Kurková; Maggie Rizer; Mini Andén; Molly Sims; Omahyra Mota; Rhea Durham; Rie Rasmussen; Trish Goff; Tyra Banks		Mary J. Blige and Andrea Bocelli
8	Victoria's Secret Fashion Show 2002	November 14, 2002 aired: November 20, 2002	Lexington Avenue Armory, New York City, US	CBS	10.5	Adriana Lima; Alessandra Ambrosio; Ana Beatriz Barros; Ana Hickmann; Bridget Hall; Caitriona Balfe; Carmen Kass; Caroline Ribeiro; Dewi Driegen; Eugenia Volodina; Fernanda Tavares; Frankie Rayder; Gisele Bündchen; Heidi Klum; Inga Savits; Karolína Kurková; Letícia Birkheuer; Lindsay Frimodt; Liya Kebede; Michelle Alves; Nadine Strittmatter; Naomi Campbell; Oluchi Onweagba; Raquel Zimmermann; Reka Ebergenyi; Tyra Banks; Ujjwala Raut; Yfke Sturm		Destiny's Child, Marc Anthony, and Phil Collins
9	Victoria's Secret Fashion Show 2003	November 13, 2003 aired: November 19, 2003	Lexington Avenue Armory, New York City, US	CBS; UPN repeat	9.44; 3.5	Adriana Lima; Alessandra Ambrosio; Ana Beatriz Barros; Angela Lindvall; Carmen Kass; Deanna Miller; Dewi Driegen; Eugenia Volodina; Fernanda Tavares; Frankie Rayder; Gisele Bündchen; Heidi Klum; Isabeli Fontana; Jacquetta Wheeler; Karolína Kurková; Letícia Birkheuer; Lindsay Frimodt; Liya Kebede; Marcelle Bittar; Margarita Svegzdaite; Michelle Alves; Mini Andén; Naomi Campbell; Oluchi Onweagba; Tyra Banks; Ujjwala Raut		Sting, Mary J. Blige, and Eve
—	Victoria's Secret Fashion Show 2004	2004 (Angels Across America Tour instead of annual fashion show)	New York City, Miami, Las Vegas and Los Angeles, US	None	N/A	Adriana Lima; Alessandra Ambrosio; Gisele Bündchen; Heidi Klum; Tyra Banks	N/A	None
10	Victoria's Secret Fashion Show 2005	November 9, 2005 aired: December 6, 2005 re-aired: December 13, 2005	Lexington Avenue Armory, New York City, US	CBS; UPN repeat	8.9; 3.33	Adriana Lima; Alessandra Ambrosio; Ana Beatriz Barros; Andi Muise; Angela Lindvall; Bianca Balti; Caroline Trentini; Caroline Winberg; Doutzen Kroes; Eugenia Volodina; Fernanda Tavares; Gisele Bündchen; Heidi Klum; Ingūna Butāne; Isabeli Fontana; Izabel Goulart; Julia Stegner; Karolína Kurková; Marija Vujović; Morgane Dubled; Naomi Campbell; Natasha Poly; Oluchi Onweagba; Raquel Zimmermann; Selita Ebanks; Tatiana Kovylina; Tyra Banks; Yfke Sturm		Chris Botti, Ricky Martin, Seal, and Rutgers University Drumline
11	Victoria's Secret Fashion Show 2006	November 16, 2006 aired: December 5, 2006 re-aired: December 19, 2006	Kodak Theatre, Los Angeles, US	CBS; The CW	6.78	Adriana Lima; Alessandra Ambrosio; Ana Beatriz Barros; Andi Muise; Angela Lindvall; Ajuma Nasenyana; Caroline Trentini; Caroline Winberg; Doutzen Kroes; Élise Crombez; Flávia de Oliveira; Gisele Bündchen; Hana Soukupová; Heather Marks; Izabel Goulart; Jessica Stam; Jeísa Chiminazzo; Julia Stegner; Karolína Kurková; Katja Shchekina; Miranda Kerr; Morgane Dubled; Natasha Poly; Oluchi Onweagba; Raquel Zimmermann; Rosie Huntington-Whiteley; Selita Ebanks		Justin Timberlake
12	Victoria's Secret Fashion Show 2007	November 16, 2007 aired: December 4, 2007 re-aired: December 11, 2007	Kodak Theatre, Los Angeles, US	CBS; The CW	7.4; 2.94	Adriana Lima; Alessandra Ambrosio; Andi Muise; Angela Lindvall; Behati Prinsloo; Candice Swanepoel; Caroline Winberg; Erin Wasson; Eugenia Volodina; Élise Crombez; Flávia de Oliveira; Hana Soukupová; Heidi Klum; Ingūna Butāne; Isabeli Fontana; Izabel Goulart; Jessica Stam; Jessica White; Julia Stegner; Karolína Kurková; Katie Wile; Lindsay Ellingson; Marija Vujović; Marisa Miller; Michaela Kocianova; Miranda Kerr; Morgane Dubled; Noémie Lenoir; Oluchi Onweagba; Rosie Huntington-Whiteley; Selita Ebanks		Spice Girls, will.i.am, Seal and Heidi Klum
13	Victoria's Secret Fashion Show 2008	November 15, 2008 aired: December 3, 2008 re-aired: December 17, 2008	Fontainebleau Hotel, Miami, US	CBS; The CW	8.7; 2.43	Abbey Lee Kershaw; Adriana Lima; Alessandra Ambrosio; Ana Beatriz Barros; Angela Lindvall; Anne Vyalitsyna; Arlenis Sosa Pena; Behati Prinsloo; Candice Swanepoel; Carmen Kass; Caroline Winberg; Clara Alonso; Doutzen Kroes; Edita Vilkevičiūtė; Emanuela de Paula; Erin Heatherton; Flávia de Oliveira; Ingūna Butāne; Heidi Klum; Isabeli Fontana; Izabel Goulart; Julia Stegner; Karolína Kurková; Lara Stone; Lindsay Ellingson; Marisa Miller; Maryna Linchuk; Miranda Kerr; Morgane Dubled; Noémie Lenoir; Rosie Huntington-Whiteley; Sarah Stephens; Shannan Click; Selita Ebanks; Sessilee Lopez		Usher and Jorge Moreno
14	Victoria's Secret Fashion Show 2009	November 19, 2009 aired: December 1, 2009 re-aired: December 9, 2009	Lexington Avenue Armory, New York City, US	CBS; The CW	8.3; 1.7	Abbey Lee Kershaw; Alessandra Ambrosio; Aminata Niaria; Ana Beatriz Barros; Anastasia Kuznetsova; Anja Rubik; Anna Jagodzińska; Behati Prinsloo; Candice Swanepoel; Caroline Trentini; Caroline Winberg; Chanel Iman; Dorothea Barth Jörgensen; Doutzen Kroes; Edita Vilkevičiūtė; Enikő Mihalik; Erin Heatherton; Elyse Taylor; Heidi Klum; Isabeli Fontana; Izabel Goulart; Jamie Lee Darley; Julia Stegner; Kylie Bisutti; Lily Aldridge; Lindsay Ellingson; Liu Wen; Lyndsey Scott; Marisa Miller; Maryna Linchuk; Miranda Kerr; Rosie Huntington-Whiteley; Selita Ebanks; Sessilee Lopez; Shannan Click; Tatiana Kovylina		The Black Eyed Peas
15	Victoria's Secret Fashion Show 2010	November 10, 2010 aired: November 30, 2010 re-aired: December 8, 2010	Lexington Avenue Armory, New York City, US	CBS; The CW	10.4; 2.4	Adriana Lima; Alessandra Ambrósio; Anja Rubik; Anne Vyalitsyna; Behati Prinsloo; Candice Swanepoel; Caroline Winberg; Chanel Iman; Constance Jablonski; Edita Vilkevičiūtė; Emanuela de Paula; Erin Heatherton; Fabiana Semprebom; Flávia de Oliveira; Gracie Carvalho; Héloïse Guerin; Isabeli Fontana; Izabel Goulart; Jacquelyn Jablonski; Jessica Stam; Julia Stegner; Karolína Kurková; Katsia Zingarevich; Laís Ribeiro; Lily Aldridge; Lily Donaldson; Lindsay Ellingson; Liu Wen; Magdalena Frackowiak; Martha Streck; Maryna Linchuk; Rosie Huntington-Whiteley; Shannan Click; Selita Ebanks		Katy Perry and Akon
16	Victoria's Secret Fashion Show 2011	November 9, 2011 aired: November 29, 2011 aired: December 14, 2011	Lexington Avenue Armory, New York City, US	CBS; The CW	10.3; 1.6	Adriana Lima; Alessandra Ambrósio; Anais Mali; Anja Rubik; Anne Vyalitsyna; Behati Prinsloo; Bregje Heinen; Cameron Russell; Candice Swanepoel; Caroline Brasch Nielsen; Caroline Winberg; Chanel Iman; Constance Jablonski; Doutzen Kroes; Elsa Hosk; Emanuela de Paula; Erin Heatherton; Flávia de Oliveira; Ieva Lagūna; Izabel Goulart; Jacquelyn Jablonski; Jessica Clarke; Joan Smalls; Julia Stegner; Karlie Kloss; Karmen Pedaru; Laís Ribeiro; Lily Aldridge; Lily Donaldson; Lindsay Ellingson; Liu Wen; Maryna Linchuk; Miranda Kerr; Shanina Shaik; Shannan Click; Sui He; Toni Garrn		Maroon 5, Kanye West, Jay-Z, and Nicki Minaj
17	Victoria's Secret Fashion Show 2012	November 7, 2012 aired: December 4, 2012 re-aired: December 12, 2012	Lexington Avenue Armory, New York City, US	CBS; The CW	9.48; 1.52	Adriana Lima; Alessandra Ambrósio; Barbara Fialho; Barbara Palvin; Behati Prinsloo; Bregje Heinen; Cameron Russell; Candice Swanepoel; Cara Delevingne; Constance Jablonski; Dorothea Barth Jörgensen; Doutzen Kroes; Elsa Hosk; Erin Heatherton; Frida Gustavsson; Hilary Rhoda; Ieva Lagūna; Isabeli Fontana; Izabel Goulart; Jacquelyn Jablonski; Jasmine Tookes; Jessica Hart; Joan Smalls; Jourdan Dunn; Karlie Kloss; Lily Aldridge; Lily Donaldson; Lindsay Ellingson; Liu Wen; Magdalena Frackowiak; Maud Welzen; Miranda Kerr; Shanina Shaik; Sharam Diniz; Shu Pei; Sui He; Toni Garrn		Rihanna, Justin Bieber, and Bruno Mars
18	Victoria's Secret Fashion Show 2013	November 13, 2013 aired: December 10, 2013 re-aired: December 16, 2013	Lexington Avenue Armory, New York City, US	CBS; The CW repeat	9.72; 1.11	Adriana Lima; Alessandra Ambrósio; Barbara Fialho; Behati Prinsloo; Candice Swanepoel; Cara Delevingne; Caroline Brasch Nielsen; Cindy Bruna; Constance Jablonski; Devon Windsor; Doutzen Kroes; Elsa Hosk; Erin Heatherton; Hilary Rhoda; Ieva Lagūna; Izabel Goulart; Jacquelyn Jablonski; Laís Ribeiro; Lily Aldridge; Lily Donaldson; Jasmine Tookes; Jessica Hart; Joan Smalls; Jourdan Dunn; Josephine Skriver; Karlie Kloss; Kasia Struss; Kelly Gale; Lindsay Ellingson; Magdalena Frackowiak; Malaika Firth; Maria Borges; Martha Hunt; Maryna Linchuk; Ming Xi; Monika Jagaciak; Sara Sampaio; Sigrid Agren; Sui He; Toni Garrn		Taylor Swift, Fall Out Boy, Neon Jungle, A Great Big World, and Rutgers University Drumline
19	Victoria's Secret Fashion Show 2014	December 2, 2014 airing: December 9, 2014 re-aired: December 16, 2014	Earls Court Exhibition Centre, London, United Kingdom	CBS; The CW repeat	9.29; 1.24	Adriana Lima; Alessandra Ambrosio; Barbara Fialho; Behati Prinsloo; Blanca Padilla; Bregje Heinen; Candice Swanepoel; Cindy Bruna; Constance Jablonski; Daniela Braga; Devon Windsor; Doutzen Kroes; Elsa Hosk; Enikő Mihalik; Grace Mahary; Ieva Lagūna; Imaan Hammam; Irina Sharipova; Isabeli Fontana; Izabel Goulart; Jacquelyn Jablonski; Jasmine Tookes; Joan Smalls; Jourdan Dunn; Josephine Skriver; Karlie Kloss; Kasia Struss; Kate Grigorieva; Kelly Gale; Lais Ribeiro; Lily Aldridge; Lily Donaldson; Lindsay Ellingson; Magdalena Frackowiak; Maria Borges; Martha Hunt; Maud Welzen; Ming Xi; Monika Jagaciak; Romee Strijd; Sara Sampaio; Shanina Shaik; Sigrid Agren; Stella Maxwell; Sui He; Taylor Hill; Yumi Lambert		Taylor Swift, Ed Sheeran, Ariana Grande, and Hozier
20	Victoria's Secret Fashion Show 2015	November 10, 2015 airing: December 8, 2015 re-aired: December 15, 2015	Lexington Avenue Armory, New York City, US	CBS; The CW repeat	6.59; 1.20	Adriana Lima; Alessandra Ambrosio; Barbara Fialho; Behati Prinsloo; Bridget Malcolm; Bruna Lirio; Candice Swanepoel; Cindy Bruna; Constance Jablonski; Daniela Braga; Devon Windsor; Elsa Hosk; Flávia Lucini; Gigi Hadid; Gracie Carvalho; Izabel Goulart; Jacquelyn Jablonski; Jasmine Tookes; Joan Smalls; Josephine Skriver; Kate Grigorieva; Kendall Jenner; Lais Ribeiro; Leila Nda; Leomie Anderson; Lily Aldridge; Lily Donaldson; Magdalena Frackowiak; Maria Borges; Martha Hunt; Maud Welzen; Megan Puleri; Ming Xi; Monika Jagaciak; Pauline Hoarau; Rachel Hilbert; Romee Strijd; Sanne Vloet; Sara Sampaio; Shanina Shaik; Sharam Diniz; Stella Maxwell; Sui He; Taylor Hill; Valery Kaufman; Vita Sidorkina; Yumi Lambert		Ellie Goulding, Selena Gomez, and The Weeknd
21	Victoria's Secret Fashion Show 2016	November 30, 2016 airing: December 5, 2016 re-aired: December 14, 2016	Grand Palais, Paris, France	CBS; The CW repeat	6.67	Adriana Lima; Alanna Arrington; Alessandra Ambrosio; Barbara Fialho; Bella Hadid; Bridget Malcolm; Brooke Perry; Camille Rowe; Cindy Bruna; Daniela Braga; Devon Windsor; Dilone; Elsa Hosk; Flávia Lucini; Georgia Fowler; Gigi Hadid; Grace Elizabeth; Herieth Paul; Izabel Goulart; Irina Shayk; Jasmine Tookes; Joan Smalls; Josephine Skriver; Jourdana Phillips; Kate Grigorieva; Keke Lindgard; Kelly Gale; Kendall Jenner; Lais Oliveira; Lais Ribeiro; Lameka Fox; Leomie Anderson; Lily Aldridge; Lily Donaldson; Liu Wen; Luma Grothe; Maggie Laine; Maria Borges; Martha Hunt; Megan Williams; Ming Xi; Rachel Hilbert; Romee Strijd; Sanne Vloet; Sara Sampaio; Stella Maxwell; Sui He; Taylor Hill; Valery Kaufman; Xiao Wen Ju; Zuri Tibby		Lady Gaga, Bruno Mars, and The Weeknd
22	Victoria's Secret Fashion Show 2017	November 20, 2017 airing: November 28, 2017 re-aired: 2017	Mercedes Benz Arena, Shanghai, China	CBS; The CW repeat	4.98	Adriana Lima; Aiden Curtiss; Alanna Arrington; Alecia Morais; Alessandra Ambrosio; Alexina Graham; Amilna Estevão; Barbara Fialho; Bella Hadid; Blanca Padilla; Bruna Lirio; Candice Swanepoel; Cindy Bruna; Daniela Braga; Devon Windsor; Dilone; Elsa Hosk; Estelle Chen; Frida Aasen; Georgia Fowler; Gizele Oliveira; Grace Bol; Grace Elizabeth; Herieth Paul; Jasmine Tookes; Josephine Skriver; Jourdana Phillips; Karlie Kloss; Kelly Gale; Lais Ribeiro; Lameka Fox; Leila Nda; Leomie Anderson; Lily Aldridge; Liu Wen; Maggie Laine; Maria Borges; Martha Hunt; Megan Williams; Ming Xi; Nadine Leopold; One Wang Yi; Romee Strijd; Roosmarijn de Kok; Samile Bermannelli; Sanne Vloet; Sara Sampaio; Stella Maxwell; Sui He; Taylor Hill; Vanessa Moody; Victoria Lee; Xiao Wen Ju; Xin Xie; Zuri Tibby		Harry Styles, Miguel, Li Yundi, Leslie Odom Jr., and Jane Zhang
23	Victoria's Secret Fashion Show 2018	November 8, 2018 airing: December 2, 2018 re-aired: December 7, 2018	Pier 94, New York City, US	ABC	3.27	Adriana Lima; Aiden Curtiss; Alanna Arrington; Alannah Walton; Alexina Graham; Barbara Fialho; Barbara Palvin; Behati Prinsloo; Bella Hadid; Candice Swanepoel; Cheyenne Carty; Cindy Bruna; Devon Windsor; Duckie Thot; Elsa Hosk; Estelle Chen; Frida Aasen; Georgia Fowler; Gigi Hadid; Gizele Oliveira; Grace Bol; Grace Elizabeth; Herieth Paul; Iesha Hodges; Isilda Moreira; Jasmine Tookes; Josephine Skriver; Josie Canseco; Jourdana Phillips; Kelly Gale; Kelsey Merritt; Kendall Jenner; Lais Ribeiro; Lameka Fox; Leomie Anderson; Liu Wen; Lorena Rae; Maggie Laine; Maia Cotton; Martha Hunt; Mayowa Nicholas; Megan Williams; Melie Tiacoh; Ming Xi; Myrthe Bolt; Nadine Leopold; Romee Strijd; Sadie Newman; Sara Sampaio; Shanina Shaik; Sofie Rovenstine; Stella Maxwell; Subah Koj; Sui He; Taylor Hill; Toni Garrn; Willow Hand; Winnie Harlow; Yasmin Wijnaldum; Zuri Tibby		Shawn Mendes, Rita Ora, The Chainsmokers, Bebe Rexha, Halsey, Leela James, Kelsea Ballerini, and The Struts
24	Victoria's Secret Fashion Show 2024	October 15, 2024	Duggal Greenhouse, Brooklyn, New York, US	Amazon Live; YouTube; Instagram	2.67	Adriana Lima; Alaato Jazyper; Alessandra Ambrosio; Alex Consani; Andreea Diaconu; Anok Yai; Anthi Fakidari; Ashley Graham; Awar Odhiang; Barbara Palvin; Behati Prinsloo; Bella Hadid; Blésnya Minher; Candice Swanepoel; Carla Bruni; Devyn Garcia; Doutzen Kroes; Eva Herzigova; Gigi Hadid; Grace Elizabeth; He Cong; Imaan Hammam; Irina Shayk; Isabeli Fontana; Jasmine Tookes; Jessie Aina; Jill Kortleve; Joan Smalls; Josephine Skriver; Kail Soleil; Kate Moss; Layla Etengan; Lila Moss; Liu Wen; Mathilda Gvarliani; Maty Fall; Mayowa Nicholas; Mia Armstrong; Mika Schneider; Neelam Gill; Paloma Elsesser; Paula Soares; Rania Benchegra; Rianne Van Rompaey; Sun Mizrahi; Taylor Hill; Tyra Banks; Valentina Sampaio; Vika Evseeva; Vittoria Ceretti; Vivienne Rohner; Xu Wei		Cher, Tyla, Lisa, and Joan Jett
25	Victoria's Secret Fashion Show 2025	October 15, 2025	Steiner Studios, Brooklyn, New York, US	Amazon Live; YouTube; Instagram	N/A	Abby Champion; Abeny Nhial; Adriana Lima; Adut Akech; Alessandra Ambrosio; Alex Consani; Amelia Gray; Angel Reese; Angelina Kendall; Anok Yai; Ashley Graham; Ashlyn Erickson; Awar Odhiang; Barbara Palvin; Barbie Ferreira; Behati Prinsloo; Bella Hadid; Blésnya Minher; Candice Swanepoel; Daiane Sodre; Devyn Garcia; Doutzen Kroes; Emeline Hoareau; Emily Ratajkowski; Gabi Moura; Gigi Hadid; Grace Elizabeth; Imaan Hammam; Irina Shayk; Iris Law; Jasmine Tookes; Joan Smalls; Josey Muckosky; Lila Moss; Lily Aldridge; Liu Wen; Luna Yohannan; Marina Moiolli; Mathilda Gvarliani; Maty Fall; Mekdalawit Mequanent; Neelam Gill; Paloma Elsesser; Precious Lee; Quenlin Blackwell; Shery Shi; Stella Maxwell; Summer Dirx; Sunisa Lee; Valentina Castro; Xiao Wen; Yasmin Wijnaldum; Yoon Young Bae; Yumi Nu		Karol G, Madison Beer, Missy Elliott and Twice
26	Victoria's Secret Fashion Show 2026	October 18, 2026	Sony Pictures Studios, Los Angeles, US	Tik Tok; YouTube; Instagram	N/A	Abby Champion; Abeny Nhial; Adriana Lima; Andreina Martínez; Alessandra Ambrósio; Alex Consani; Amelia Gray; Anok Yai; Ashley Graham; Awar Odhiang; Ayen Agany; Bam Leasure; Barbara Palvin; Behati Prinsloo; Bella Hadid; Bertie Salazar; Breanna Ivy; Cala Moragas; Candice Swanepoel; Caroline Trentini; Christina Nadin; Christine Bashombana; Cindy Bruna; Daiane Sodre; Devyn Garcia; Doutzen Kroes; Elina Gunawardena; Elsa Hosk; Emeline Hoareau; Emma Jette; Felice Nova Noordhoff; Gabi Moura; Gigi Hadid; Gizele Oliveira; Grace Elizabeth; He Cong; Honey Ordonez; Imaan Hammam; Irina Shayk; Iris Law; Jasmine Tookes; Joan Smalls; Jordan Leftwich; Kylie Jenner; Lauren Bertie; Lena Mantler; Liu Wen; Luiza Perote; Luna Yohannaan; Malika El Maslouhi; Marlee Guillory; Mathilda Gvarliani; Ming Xi; Nanabah Grace; Natalia Bryant; Neelam Gill; Paloma Elsesser; Precious Lee; Presley Kiffin; Quenlin Blackwell; Ravleen Verghese; Rosalieke Fuchs; Rosie Huntington-Whiteley; Shamari Koharu; Solange Omen; Summer Dirx; Sydney Waits; Tatyana Tinsley; Tara Falla; Trinity Rodman; Vittoria Ceretti; Yasmin Wijnaldum; Yoon Young Bae; Yue Gu; Yumi Nu		Katseye, Megan Moroney, Megan Thee Stallion and Tate McRae

== Fantasy Bra ==
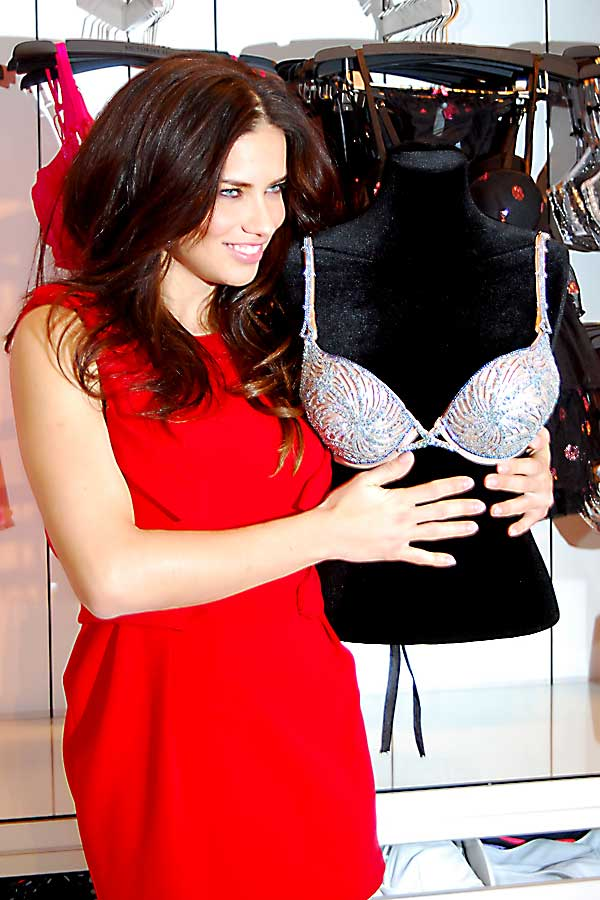
Adriana Lima with the 2010 Fantasy Bra

Typically, one model is chosen among the Angels to wear a bejeweled bra dubbed the "Fantasy Bra". It was first advertised in the Victoria's Secret catalog, but since 2001 has been worn in the fashion shows. Prior to each fashion show, Victoria's Secret contracts a renowned jewelry designer to craft the bra to be used as a focal point for promoting the fashion show and as a centerpiece within it. However, only the centerpiece from the 2004 Heavenly "70" Fantasy Bra and the 2012 Floral Fantasy Bra and Gift Set have found a buyer. If not bought, the bras are usually dismantled after a year.

Heidi Klum and Adriana Lima have worn the Fantasy Bra in three different years. Gisele Bündchen, Tyra Banks, Karolína Kurková, and Alessandra Ambrosio have each worn two Fantasy Bras. Tyra Banks also wore the 1996 Million Dollar Miracle Bra during the 1999 fashion show. As of 2018, the fantasy bra has been worn 8 times by a Brazilian model, 5 times by an American model, 4 times by a German model, and 3 times by a Czech model.

The $15 million price tag for the 2000 bra worn by Gisele Bündchen earned a place in the Guinness World Records as the most expensive item of lingerie ever created. The $3 million 2009 Harlequin Fantasy Bra and the $2 million 2010 Bombshell Fantasy Bra were designed by Damiani. Listed below are the prices per set (including accessories) for the 2007 and 2013 editions, the 2013 bra alone is worth $10,000,000. The 2012 Floral Fantasy Bra was accompanied by a $500,000 perfume bottle.

In 2014, for the first time, two fantasy bras were created. They were worn by Alessandra Ambrosio and Adriana Lima and were valued at $2,000,000 each.

Following the show's return in 2024, the Fantasy Bra was not featured, and it remained absent in the 2025 show. It returned for the 2026 show.

Year	Name	Model	Value	Appeared in fashion show	Refs
1996	Million Dollar Miracle Bra	Claudia Schiffer	$1,000,000	✘	
1997	Diamond Dream Bra	Tyra Banks	$3,000,000	✘	
1998	Dream Angel Bra	Daniela Peštová	$5,000,000	✘	
1999	Millennium Bra	Heidi Klum	$10,000,000	✘	
2000	Red Hot Fantasy Bra/Panties	Gisele Bündchen	$15,000,000	✘	
2001	Heavenly Star Bra	Heidi Klum	$12,500,000	Yes	
2002	Star of Victoria Fantasy Bra	Karolína Kurková	$10,000,000	Yes	
2003	Very Sexy Fantasy Bra	Heidi Klum	$11,000,000	Yes	
2004	Heavenly "70" Fantasy Bra	Tyra Banks	$10,000,000	✘	
2005	Sexy Splendor Fantasy Bra	Gisele Bündchen	$12,500,000	Yes	
2006	Hearts On Fire Diamond Fantasy Bra	Karolína Kurková	$6,500,000	Yes	
2007	Holiday Fantasy Bra Set	Selita Ebanks	$4,500,000	Yes	
2008	Black Diamond Fantasy Miracle Bra	Adriana Lima	$5,000,000	Yes	
2009	Harlequin Fantasy Bra	Marisa Miller	$3,000,000	Yes	
2010	Bombshell Fantasy Bra	Adriana Lima	$2,000,000	Yes	
2011	Fantasy Treasure Bra	Miranda Kerr	$2,500,000	Yes	
2012	Floral Fantasy Bra & Gift Set	Alessandra Ambrosio	$2,500,000	Yes	
2013	Royal Fantasy Bra	Candice Swanepoel	$10,000,000	Yes	
2014	Dream Angels Fantasy Bras	Alessandra Ambrosio; Adriana Lima	$2,000,000 $2,000,000	Yes	
2015	Fireworks Fantasy Bra	Lily Aldridge	$2,000,000	Yes	
2016	Bright Night Fantasy Bra	Jasmine Tookes	$3,000,000	Yes	
2017	Champagne Nights Fantasy Bra	Lais Ribeiro	$2,000,000	Yes	
2018	Dream Angels Fantasy Bra	Elsa Hosk	$1,000,000	Yes	
2026	Very Sexy Shine Fantasy Bra	Kylie Jenner	$50,000,000	Yes	

=== Fantasy Bra count ===
#	Model	Count	Year
1	Adriana Lima	3	2008, 2010, 2014
1	Heidi Klum	3	1999, 2001, 2003
2	Alessandra Ambrosio	2	2012, 2014
2	Karolína Kurková	2	2002, 2006
2	Gisele Bündchen	2	2000, 2005
2	Tyra Banks	2	1997, 2004
3	Kylie Jenner	1	2026
3	Elsa Hosk	1	2018
3	Lais Ribeiro	1	2017
3	Jasmine Tookes	1	2016
3	Lily Aldridge	1	2015
3	Candice Swanepoel	1	2013
3	Miranda Kerr	1	2011
3	Marisa Miller	1	2009
3	Selita Ebanks	1	2007
3	Daniela Peštová	1	1998
3	Claudia Schiffer	1	1996

== Swarovski ==
Since 2003, similar to the Fantasy Bra, one or more models are chosen to wear the "Swarovski Outfit" and the "Swarovski Wings" every year. The first Swarovski items that were shown on the runway were given to Alessandra Ambrosio. Victoria's Secret had worked with Swarovski for 9 years prior to the Swarovski items worn on the runway in 2011.

Alessandra Ambrosio's Swarovski outfit, worn in 2011, included a 60-pound wing which was made out of 105,000 Swarovski crystals. The base of her wing was made out of 23-carat gold. Cameron Russell was given the "10th Anniversary" Swarovski outfit, worn in 2012, celebrating Victoria's Secret's 10th year working with Swarovski.

The 2013 Swarovski outfit was a 3D printed piece given to Lindsay Ellingson, which included mini-micro Swarovski crystals. In 2017, Elsa Hosk was chosen to wear the 15th Anniversary Swarovski outfit, which came out to a total value of $1,000,000.

Similar to the Fantasy Bra, following the show's return in 2024, the Swarovski Outfit and Swarovski Wings were not featured, and they remained absent in the 2025 show. They also remained absent in the 2026 show, despite the return of the Fantasy Bra.

Year	Model	Runway Shows	Segment Worn	Notes
2011	Alessandra Ambrosio	2000–2003 • 2005–2017 • 2024–2026	Segment 3: Passion Play	Heaviest Wings (40 pounds)
2012	Cameron Russell	2011–2012	Segment 5: Silver Screen Angels	10th Anniversary Swarovski Outfit
2013	Lindsay Ellingson	2007–2014	Segment 6: Snow Angels	3D Printed Swarovski Outfit
2014	Lily Donaldson	2010–2016	Segment 5: Fairy Tale	"The Swarovski Look"
2015	Martha Hunt	2013–2018	Segment 6: Fireworks	Includes Swarovski, Light Up Wings
2016	Josephine Skriver	2013–2018 • 2024	Segment 6: Bright Night Angel	Silver Fringe Swarovski Outfit
2017	Elsa Hosk	2011–2018 • 2026	Segment 5: Nomadic Adventure	$1,000,000 Swarovski Outfit and Wing
2018	Romee Strijd	2014–2018	Segment 7: Celestial Angel	Shooting Star Swarovski Outfit and Wing

== Show Opening & Closing models ==
#	Year	Opening model	Opening count	Closing count	Angel status	Runway shows	Notes	Closing model	Opening count	Closing count	Angel status	Runway shows	Notes
1	1995	Ingrid Seynhaeve	1			1995 • 1997 • 2000	Non-Angel Opening	Stephanie Seymour		1	1997–2000	1995–2000	
2	1996	Naomi Campbell	1			1996–1998 • 2002–2003 • 2005	Non-Angel Opening	Stephanie Seymour		2	1997-2000	1995–2000	
3	1997	Claudia Schiffer	1			1997	Non-Angel Opening	Naomi Campbell	1	1		1996–1998 • 2002–2003 • 2005	
4	1998	Karen Mulder	1		1996–2000	1996–2000		Naomi Campbell	1	2		1996–1998 • 2002–2003 • 2005	Non-Angel Closing
5	1999	Carmen Kass	1	1		1999–2000 • 2002–2003 • 2008	Non-Angel Opening & Closing	Carmen Kass	1	1		1999–2000 • 2002–2003 • 2008	Non-Angel Opening & Closing
6	2000	Gisele Bündchen	1		2000–2007	1999–2003 • 2005-2006		Laetitia Casta		1	1998–2000	1997–2000	
7	2001	Karolína Kurková	1		2005–2009	2000–2003 • 2005-2008 • 2010	Non-Angel Opening	Adriana Lima		1	2000–2018	1999–2003 • 2005–2008 • 2010–2018 • 2024-2026	
8	2002	Gisele Bündchen	2		2000–2007	1999–2003 • 2005-2006		Adriana Lima		2	2000–2018	1999–2003 • 2005–2008 • 2010–2018 • 2024-2026	
9	2003	Adriana Lima	1	2	2000–2018	1999–2003 • 2005–2008 • 2010–2018 • 2024-2026		Heidi Klum		1	1999–2010	1997–2003 • 2005 • 2007–2009	
10	2005	Gisele Bündchen	3		2000–2007	1999–2003 • 2005-2006	Wearing "Sexy Splendor Fantasy Bra" ($12,500,000)	Tyra Banks		1	1997–2005	1996–2003 • 2005 • 2024	Last Walk
11	2006	Gisele Bündchen	4		2000–2007	1999–2003 • 2005-2006		Ana Beatriz Barros		1		2002–2003 • 2005–2006 • 2008–2009	Non-Angel Closing
12	2007	Adriana Lima	2	2	2000–2018	1999–2003 • 2005–2008 • 2010–2018 • 2024-2026		Heidi Klum		2	1999–2010	1997–2003 • 2005 • 2007–2009	Tied with Adriana Lima for most shows closed, with 2.
13	2008	Adriana Lima	3	2	2000–2018	1999–2003 • 2005–2008 • 2010–2018 • 2024-2026		Heidi Klum		3	1999–2010	1997–2003 • 2005 • 2007–2009	
14	2009	Alessandra Ambrosio	1		2004–2017	2000–2003 • 2005–2017 • 2024-2026		Doutzen Kroes		1	2008–2014	2005–2006 • 2008–2009 • 2011–2014 • 2024-2026	
15	2010	Adriana Lima	4	2	2000–2018	1999–2003 • 2005–2008 • 2010–2018 • 2024-2026	Tied with Gisele Bündchen for most shows opened, with 4.	Chanel Iman		1	2010–2012	2009–2011	
16	2011	Candice Swanepoel	1		2010–2018	2007–2015 • 2017–2018 • 2024-2026		Karlie Kloss		1	2013–2015	2011–2014 • 2017	Non-Angel Closing
17	2012	Adriana Lima	5	2	2000–2018	1999–2003 • 2005–2008 • 2010–2018 • 2024-2026	Currently holds the record for most shows opened, with 5.	Toni Garrn		1		2012	Non-Model Closing
18	2013	Candice Swanepoel	2		2010–2018	2007–2015 • 2017–2018 • 2024-2026	Wearing "Royal Fantasy Bra" ($10,000,000)	Magdalena Frackowiak		1		2010 • 2012–2015	Non-Angel Closing
19	2014	Behati Prinsloo	1		2009–2019	2007–2015 • 2018 • 2024-2026		Candice Swanepoel	2	1	2010–2018	2007–2015 • 2017–2018 • 2024-2026	
20	2015	Behati Prinsloo	2		2009–2019	2007–2015 • 2018 • 2024-2026		Martha Hunt		1	2015–2020	2013–2018	Wearing Swarovski Outfit
21	2016	Elsa Hosk	1		2015–2020	2011–2018 • 2026		Lily Aldridge		1	2010–2018	2009–2017 • 2025	
22	2017	Candice Swanepoel	3	1	2010–2018	2007–2015 • 2017–2018 • 2024-2026		Alessandra Ambrosio	1	1	2004–2017	2000–2003 • 2005–2017 • 2024-2026	Last Walk
23	2018	Taylor Hill	1		2015–2021	2014-2018 • 2024		Adriana Lima	5	3	2000–2018	1999-2003 • 2005-2008 • 2010-2018 • 2024-2026	Tied with Heidi Klum for most shows closed, with 3. Last Walk
24	2024	Gigi Hadid	1			2015-2016 • 2018 • 2024-2026		Bella Hadid		1		2016–18 • 2024-2026	
25	2025	Jasmine Tookes	1		2015-2021	2012–18 • 2024-2026		Bella Hadid		2		2016–18 • 2024-2026	
26	2026	Bella Hadid	1	2		2016-18 • 2024-2026		Adriana Lima	5	4	2000-2018	1999-2003 • 2005-2008 • 2010-2018 • 2024-2026	

=== Opening count ===
In 25 editions (1995–2003; 2005–18; 2024-2026), 16 models have opened the show.

#	Opening model	Opening count	Year
1	Adriana Lima	5	2003, 2007, 2008, 2010, 2012
2	Gisele Bündchen	4	2000, 2002, 2005, 2006
3	Candice Swanepoel	3	2011, 2013, 2017
4	Behati Prinsloo	2	2014, 2015
5	Bella Hadid	1	2026
5	Jasmine Tookes	1	2025
5	Gigi Hadid	1	2024
5	Taylor Hill	1	2018
5	Elsa Hosk	1	2016
5	Alessandra Ambrosio	1	2009
5	Karolína Kurková	1	2001
5	Carmen Kass	1	1999
5	Karen Mulder	1	1998
5	Claudia Schiffer	1	1997
5	Naomi Campbell	1	1996
5	Ingrid Seynhaeve	1	1995

=== Closing count ===
In 25 editions (1995–2003; 2005–18; 2024-2025), 17 models have closed the show.

#	Closing model	Closing count	Year
1	Adriana Lima	4	2001, 2002, 2018, 2026
2	Heidi Klum	3	2003, 2007, 2008
3	Naomi Campbell	2	1997, 1998
3	Stephanie Seymour	2	1995, 1996
3	Bella Hadid	2	2024, 2025
4	Alessandra Ambrosio	1	2017
4	Lily Aldridge	1	2016
4	Martha Hunt	1	2015
4	Candice Swanepoel	1	2014
4	Magdalena Frackowiak	1	2013
4	Toni Garrn	1	2012
4	Karlie Kloss	1	2011
4	Chanel Iman	1	2010
4	Doutzen Kroes	1	2009
4	Ana Beatriz Barros	1	2006
4	Tyra Banks	1	2005
4	Laetitia Casta	1	2000
4	Carmen Kass	1	1999

== See also ==
- List of Victoria's Secret models
