= Maud Welzen =

Dutch model

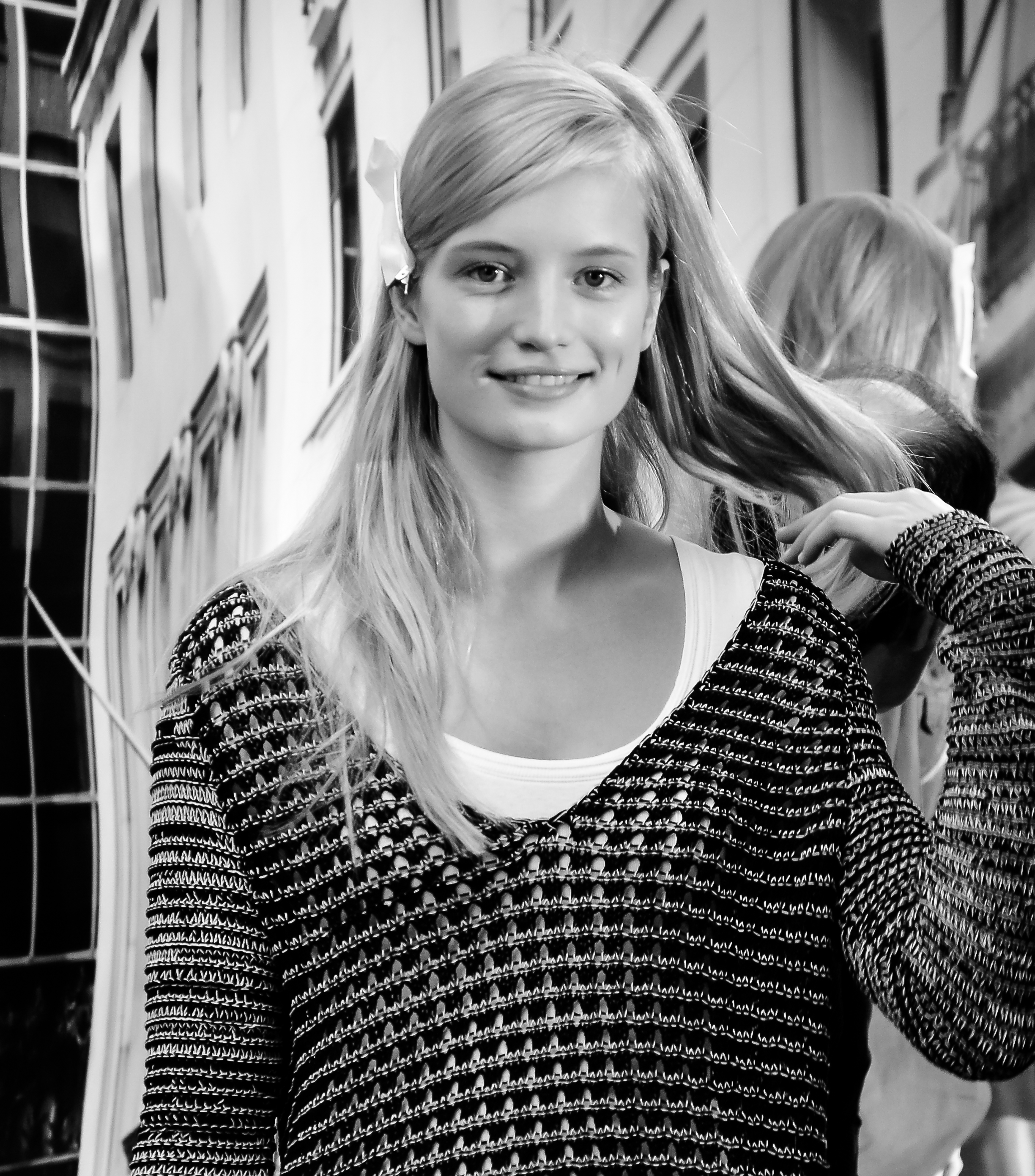
- Maud Welzen, 2012
- Born: Maud Welzen; 13 November 1993 (age 32); Beek, Netherlands
- Occupation: Model
- Modeling information
- Height: 1.79 m (5 ft 10 1/2 in)
- Hair color: blond
- Eye color: blue
- Agency: Women / 360 (New York); Women Management (Paris); Monster Management (Milan); The Hive Management (London); Sight Management Studio (Barcelona); Model Management (Hamburg); Public Image Management (Montreal); Munich Models (Munich)

Maud Welzen (born 13 November 1993) is a Dutch model.

== Career ==
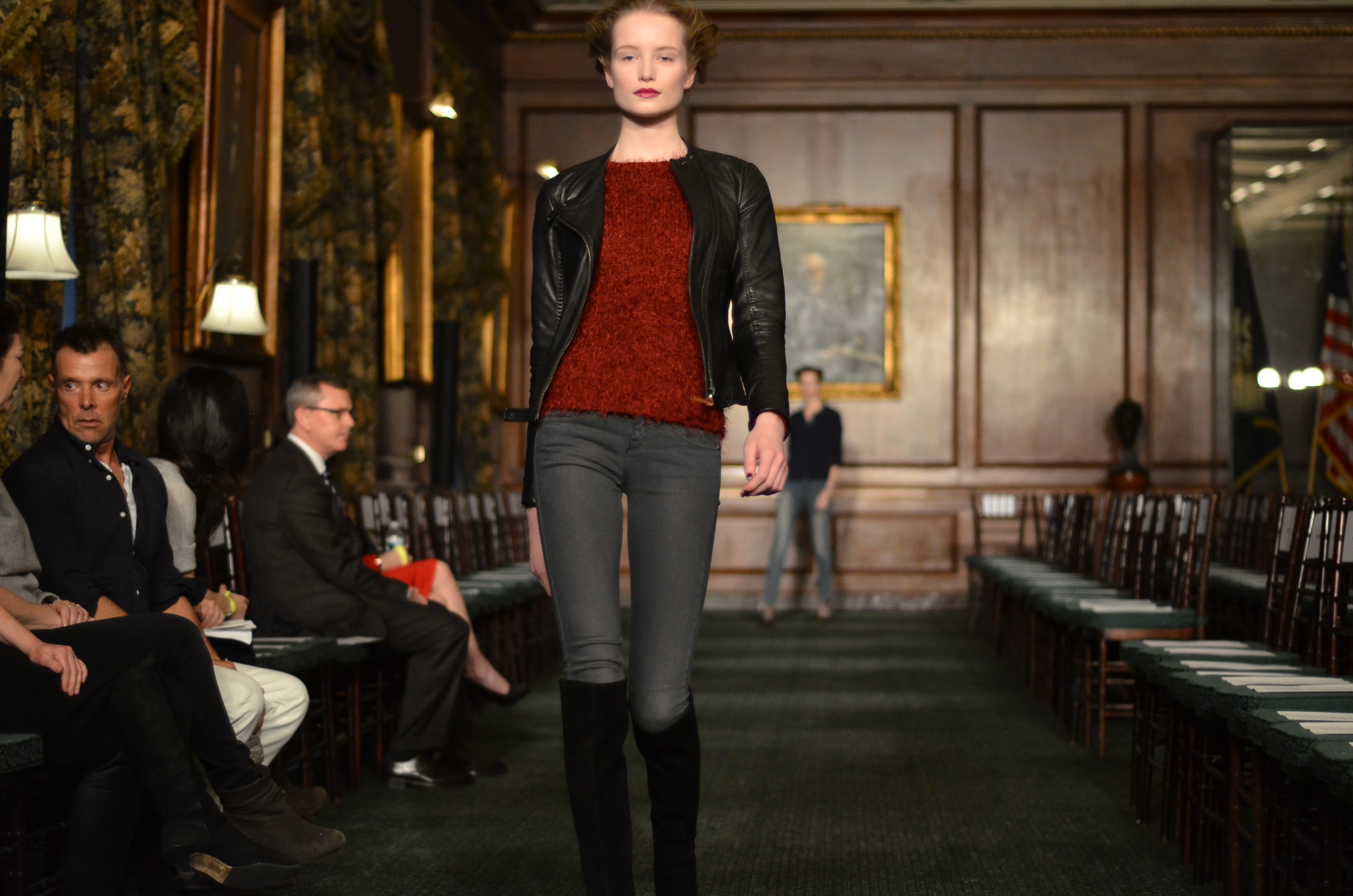
Maud Welzen at a Bill Blass fashion show rehearsal.

Welzen was discovered in Paris while on a school trip at the age of 13. She started her career in 2010, and has walked for Moschino, Victoria's Secret, Chanel, Burberry, Vera Wang, Alexander McQueen, Valentino SpA, Viktor & Rolf, Michael Kors, Monique Lhuillier, Dolce & Gabbana, and Giambattista Valli.

At their 2012 fashion show, she walked for PINK, the younger Victoria's Secret line. She walked again at the Victoria's Secret Fashion Shows 2014 and 2015.

== Personal life ==
Welzen married Bram Aarts at Châtau St. Gerlach in Limburg on 31 August 2019, after becoming engaged just over four months previously on 18 April 2019. The wedding was attended by numerous of Welzen's Dutch model colleagues and friends, including Romee Strijd, Sanne Vloet, Julia van Os and Daphne Groeneveld.
