= Danita =

Danita is a given name, meaning "God is my judge". Notable people with the name include:

- Danita Angell, American model
- Danita Paner (born 1989), Filipino pop-rock singer and actress
