= Kylie Bisutti =

American author and former model

- Born: Kylie Ann Ludlow; March 31, 1990 (age 36); Jackpot, Nevada
- Spouse: Mike Bisutti (m. 2009)
- Children: 4
- Modeling information
- Height: 1.78 m (5 ft 10 in)
- Hair color: Light brown
- Eye color: Brown

Kylie Bisutti (born March 31, 1990, in Jackpot, Nevada) is an American author and former model who won the 2009 "Victoria's Secret Model Search" competition, broadcast online through CBS and concluded during the December 1st airing of that year's Fashion Show. She soon quit modeling lingerie due to it conflicting with her Christian values and in 2013 published a memoir, I'm No Angel: From Victoria's Secret Model to Role Model. She followed that with a daily devotional book for young women, and later started a Christian clothing line with her aunt called God Inspired Fashion.

== Personal life ==
Bisutti (née Ludlow) was born in Jackpot, Nevada, and grew up in Las Vegas, Nevada. At 15, she was invited by a friend from high school to a church youth group party, and after learning more about Christianity, became a Christian herself.

For her 18th birthday, her parents took her on along on her father's company retreat to Mexico, where she met her father's co-worker, Mike Bisutti, whom she began dating and later married in Cabo San Lucas in 2009. They now live in Montana. On January 21, 2014, they welcomed their first child, a boy named Jase Michael Bisutti. They have since welcomed two more sons: Luca Bisutti, born July 26, 2015, and Seth Michael Bisutti, born March 23, 2017. Her fourth child, daughter Juliyanna Grace, was born on January 24, 2019.

== Career ==
Bisutti aspired to be a Victoria's Secret model from a young age, and recalls being told by friends and strangers to become a model. She won her first casting call at age eight and began modeling regularly at the Fashion Show Mall in Las Vegas.

She won the 2009 "Victoria's Secret Model Search" competition and walked the runway at the 2009 Victoria's Secret Fashion Show. She later modeled for FHM and Maxim.

In May 2013, Bisutti released her memoir I'm No Angel: From Victoria's Secret Model to Role Model, describing her life and detailing how, after the show, she became disillusioned with modeling due to the provocative nature of the work, developing body image issues, and negative experiences with photographers. She claimed she went through "unhealthy" things to book jobs, such as crash and starvation diets, saying those behaviors are common practice among models. She said, "For little girls looking in, it's really not good for them to see those things." Bisutti decided to quit modeling, a decision her husband supported. She tweeted "I quit being a VS model to be a Proverbs 31 wife."

Prior to the book's release, Victoria's Secret released a statement claiming Bisutti had made "numerous fabrications and misstatements…She was never a Victoria's Secret 'Angel' as defined by the terms of our Angel model contract. And contrary to Ms. Bisutti's claims, she was never offered any subsequent modeling contracts or opportunities with Victoria's Secret despite her multiple appeals for further work." Bisutti responded in an interview: "All the truth is in the book. … My book is really not about Victoria's Secret. It's about the modeling industry as a whole and about helping girls with self-body image issues, eating disorders and really exposing the entire industry for what it is. It's not targeting their brand." Bisutti said that initially legal issues were considered but after having read the book, the company "realized there were no grounds for the statements they came out with".

In 2014, Tyndale House published Bisutti's 30 Days to a More Beautiful You, a Christian devotional for young women.

Bisutti and her aunt started a Christian clothing line for men, women and children that features inspirational sayings, Bible verses and artwork called God Inspired Fashion. She said "With all of the bullying that goes on nowadays, I really wanted to have clothing that focused on uplifting kids and verses that would maybe put a smile on someone’s face if they were having a bad day". She also wanted the clothing to be positive and provoke questions and conversations between students. The clothing line as of 2018 is only available in the United States, but Bisutti said she has had requests from Europe, Mexico, and Canada. She also said that the only group that hadn't given positive feedback is atheists: "They are really against the children's line, and having Bible verses on children's clothing." The line differs from other Christian clothing in that items like collared shirts, vests, jackets, jeans and more are included, instead of the typical t-shirts with logos presented by other vendors.
