= Sabah Koj =

Australian fashion model

- Born: c. 1998 (age 27–28); South Sudan
- Modeling information
- Height: 1.80 m (5 ft 11 in)
- Hair color: Black
- Eye color: Brown
- Agency: Marilyn Agency (New York, Paris); Monster Management (Milan); Established Models (London); Vivien’s Model Management (Sydney)

Sabah Koj (born circa 1998) is a South Sudanese-Australian fashion model. Koj was the first African model to open a fashion show in Australia.

== Early life ==
As Sudanese refugees, her family emigrated to Egypt when she was 4 years old. They eventually settled in Melbourne, Australia, in 2005. She speaks Arabic, English, and Dinka.

== Career ==
She has modeled for Armani, Jacquemus, Burberry, Roland Mouret, Alexa Chung, Kate Spade, Emilio Pucci, Christian Siriano, Oscar de la Renta, Mugler, John Galliano, Balmain, Marc Jacobs, Roksanda Ilinčić, and Marni among others.

Koj had her debut appearance in the Victoria's Secret Fashion Show in 2018. In addition to Victoria's Secret she has expressed Gucci and Prada as her modelling goals.

Models.com selected her as a "Top Newcomer" in 2018.
