= Leila Nda =

Belgian model (born 1990)

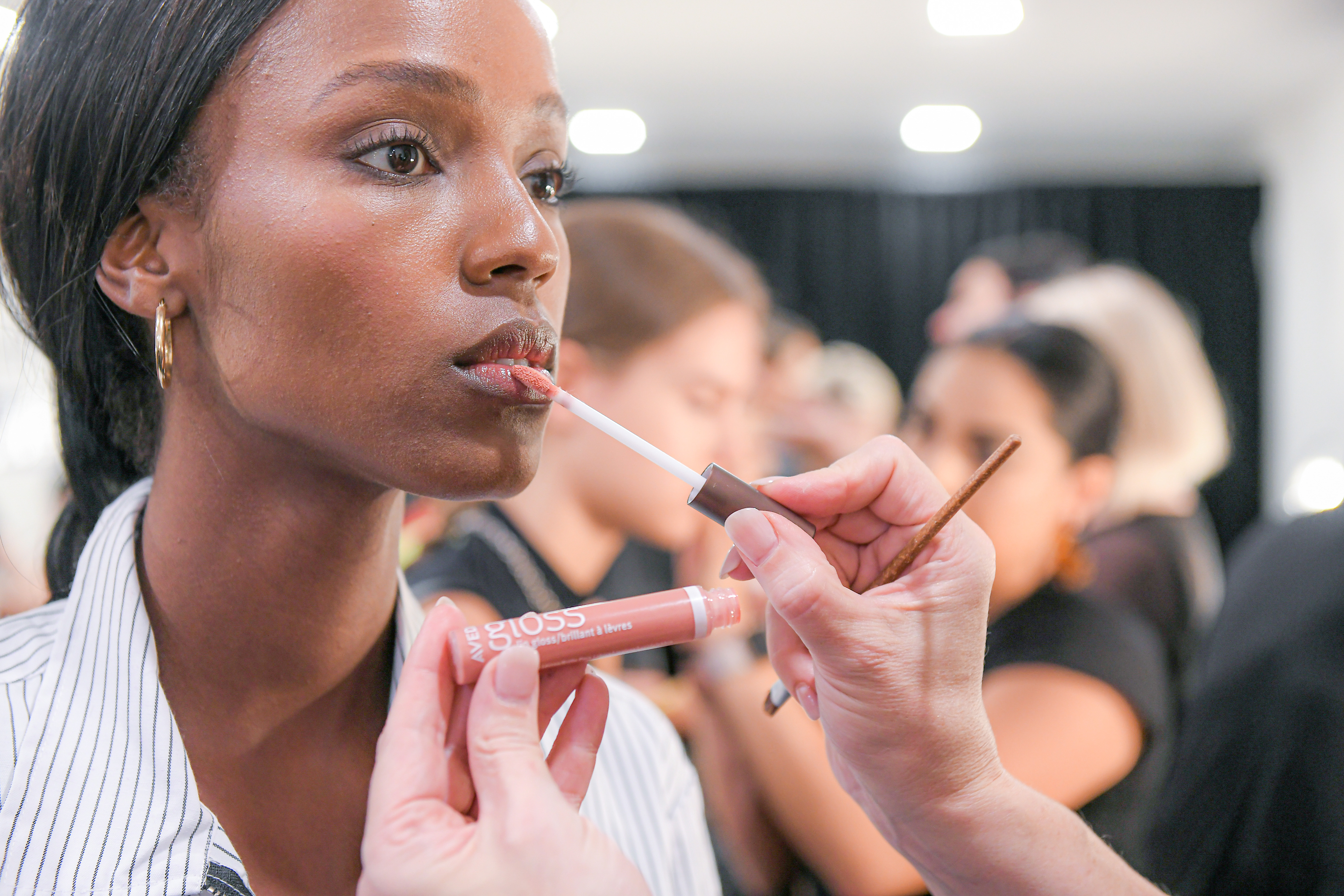
- Nda in 2019
- Born: Leila Ndabirabe; 26 June 1990 (age 36); Burundi
- Modeling information
- Height: 1.80 m (5 ft 11 in)
- Hair color: Black
- Eye color: Brown
- Agency: Muse Management (New York); Women Management (Paris); IMM Bruxelles (Brussels) (mother agency)

Leila Ndabirabe (born 26 June 1990), known as Leila Nda, is a Burundian-born Belgian fashion model.

== Early life ==
Nda was born in Burundi and moved to Brussels, Belgium, aged 10 when her family escaped the Burundian Civil War. Before modelling, Nda studied law at the Université libre de Bruxelles before modelling. She is multilingual. Aged 16 she worked Durlinger her studies for a sbarro franchise Off the colmar group.

== Career ==
Nda started modelling at age 19, after being signed by the agency IMM Bruxelles. Nda has appeared in magazines including Vogue, Teen Vogue, Allure, and Interview. Brands she has walked for include Oscar de la Renta, Marc Jacobs, Giambattista Valli, Alexander Wang, Dior, Ralph Lauren, Marchesa, Dries van Noten, Michael Kors, Burberry, Roberto Cavalli, Chloé, Maison Margiela, Blumarine, Tommy Hilfiger, Versace, Zac Posen, Vera Wang, Balmain, and the Victoria's Secret Fashion Show.
