= Sharam Diniz =

Angolan model

- Born: Sharam-Sharam da Conceição Diniz; March 2, 1991 (age 35); Luanda, Angola
- Occupation: Fashion model
- Modeling information
- Height: 5 ft 10 in (178 cm)
- Hair color: Brown
- Eye color: Brown
- Agency: One Management (New York); Premium Models (Paris); Monster Management (Milan); Models 1 (London); Uno Models (Barcelona); Nomad Management (Los Angeles); Way Model Management (São Paulo); Glam Celebrity (Portugal); MP Management (Stockholm)

Sharam-Sharam da Conceição Diniz, known professionally as Sharam Diniz, is an Angolan-Portuguese fashion model and businesswoman. She is known for her appearances in the Victoria's Secret Fashion Show.

== Career ==
Diniz has been on the cover of GQ Portugal and Vogue Portugal. Her first modeling job was a 2011 Victoria's Secret spring advertisement. She appeared in a SoHo billboard for 7 for All Mankind jeans.

Diniz has walked the runway for Balmain, Calvin Klein, Prabal Gurung, Vivienne Westwood, Cushnie et Ochs, Rag & Bone, Kenneth Cole, Carolina Herrera, Hervé Léger, Jason Wu, Victoria's Secret among others. She has starred in ads for Tom Ford, Chanel, Ralph Lauren, Armani Exchange, 7 For All Mankind, Target, H&M, Clinique and Anne Klein.

She has appeared in Allure, Cosmopolitan, V (magazine) and Sports Illustrated Swimsuit Issue among others.

In Portugal, she was given the Globos de Ouro ("Golden Globe") award for "Best Female Model".

Diniz appeared in a “Made in Portugal” ad.

== See also ==
- List of Victoria's Secret models
