= Caroline Brasch Nielsen =

Danish model

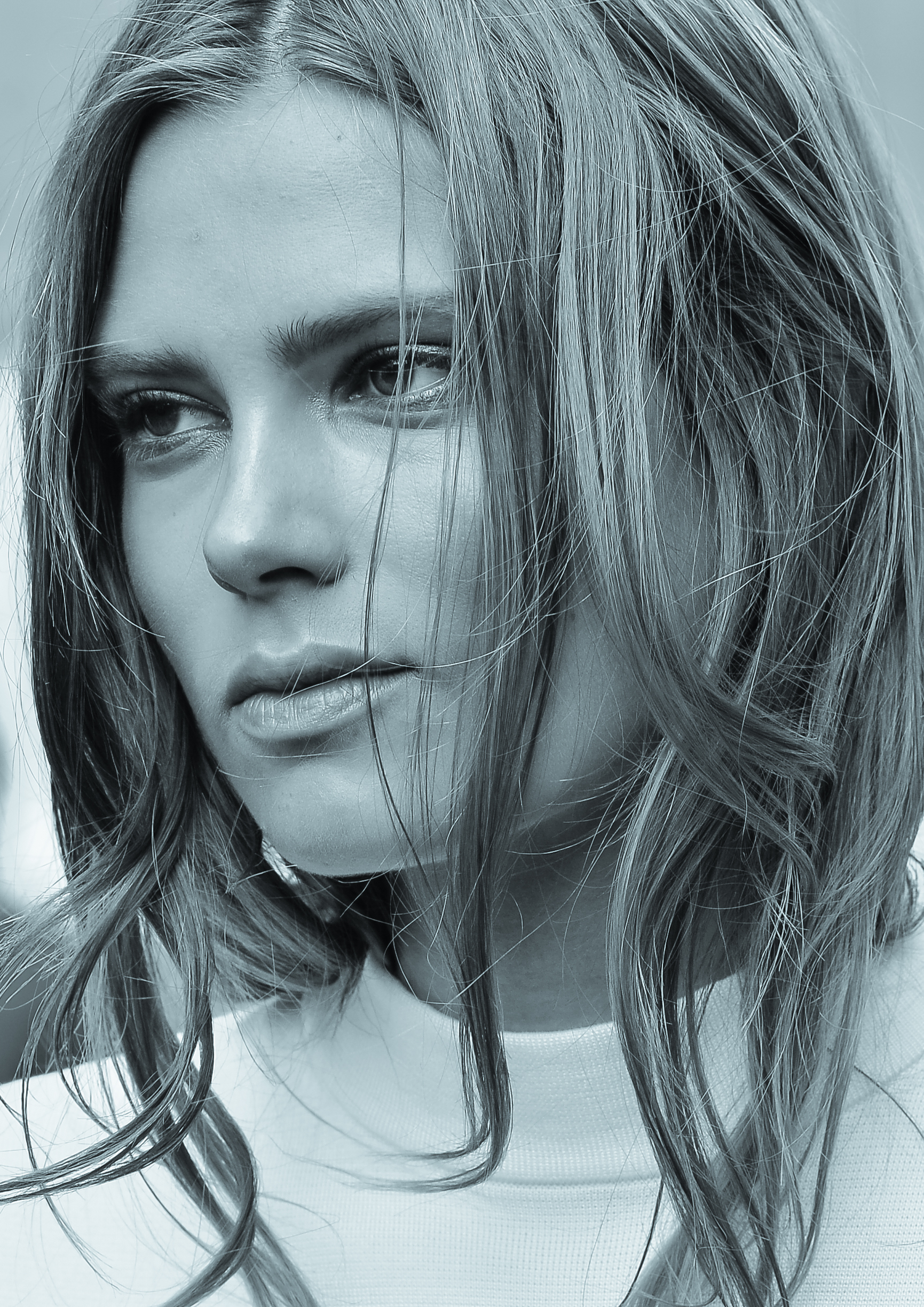
- Nielsen in 2014
- Born: 21 June 1993 (age 32); Copenhagen, Denmark
- Occupation: Model
- Years active: 2010-present
- Spouse: Frederik Bille Brahe (m. 2018)
- Children: 1
- Modeling information
- Height: 1.79 m (5 ft 10 1/2 in)
- Hair color: Brown
- Eye color: Brown
- Agency: The Society Management (New York); Elite Model Management (Paris, Milan, Barcelona, Copenhagen, Toronto); Storm Model Management (London); Model Management (Hamburg); Munich Models (Munich); MP Stockholm (Stockholm); Vivien's Model Management - Sydney (Sydney)

Caroline Brasch Nielsen (born 21 June 1993) is a Danish fashion model. She is well known for being the face of Marc Jacobs and Valentino, as well as some fragrances : Fendi's Fan di Fendi Blossom, Chloe's Roses de Chloe.

== Early life and career ==
Caroline Brasch Nielsen was scouted in a pizza bar in Copenhagen, while she was eating with her friends. She then started walking runways, her first being Dries Van Noten at Paris Fashion Week fall 2010. The same season she opens Valentino and walks for Balenciaga, Givenchy, Yves Saint Laurent and Chanel. Models.com names her one of the « Top 10 Newcomers FW 2010 ».

Since then, she has been working for the likes of Narciso Rodriguez, Thakoon, Alberta Ferretti, Nina Ricci, Herve Leger, Giambattista Valli, Elie Saab, Christian Dior, D&G, Matthew Williamson, Prabal Gurung, Tory Burch, Hugo Boss, Chloe, Fendi, Calvin Klein, Zara, Oscar de la Renta, Sonia Rykiel, Balenciaga, H&M, Burberry, Marc Jacobs and Jill Stuart as well as being on the cover and inside magazines, such as Vogue (Italia, Paris, UK, China, Russia, Germany, Japan, US), Harper's Bazaar, Dazed & Confused, W, Numéro, i-D, Cover, Interview and Elle.

She walked the 2011 and 2013 Victoria's Secret Fashion Show.
