= Dorothea Barth Jörgensen =

Swedish model

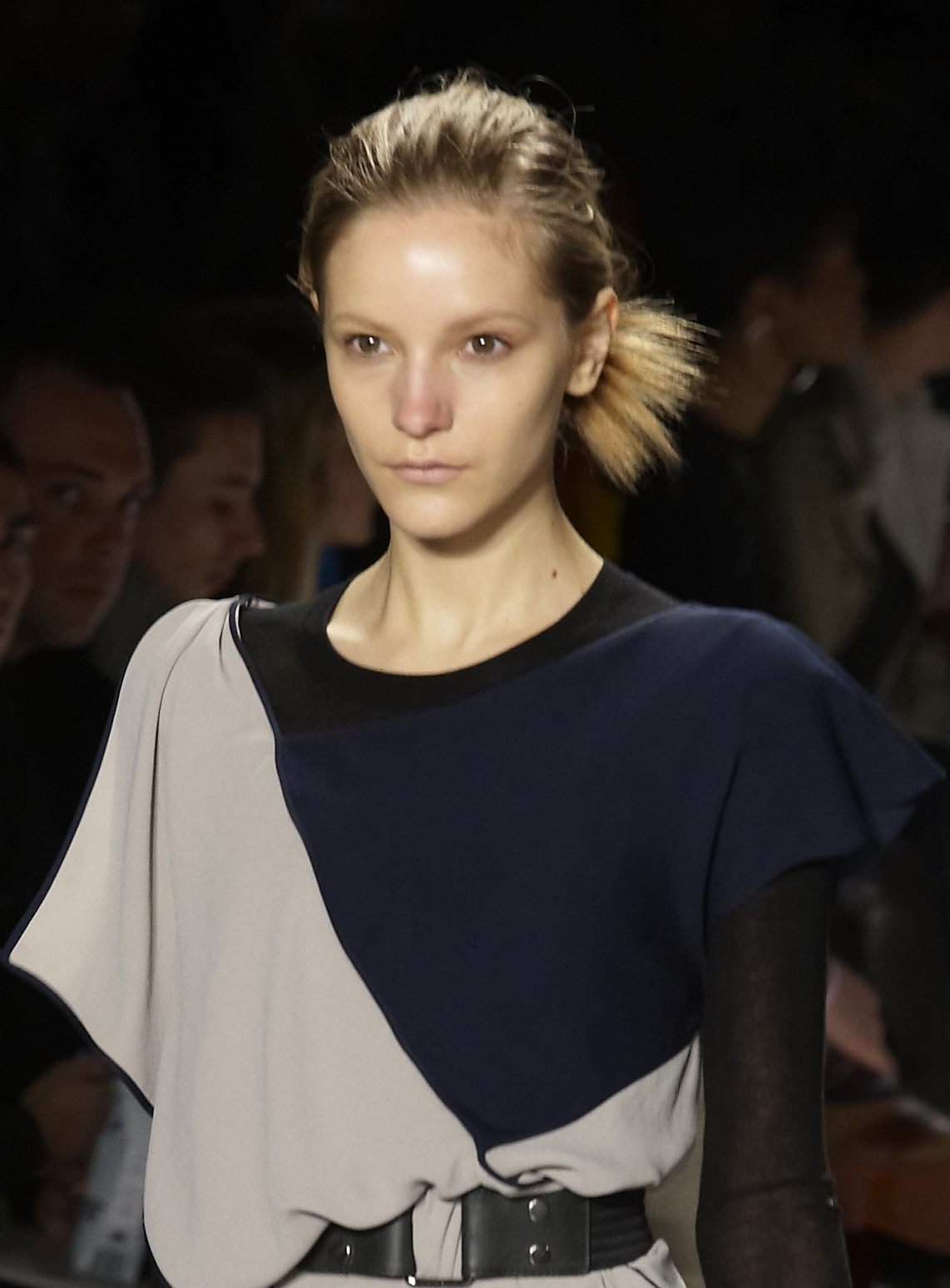
- Barth Jörgensen walks for BCBG Max Azria in 2010
- Born: 6 November 1990 (age 35); Stockholm, Sweden
- Occupation: Model
- Years active: 2008–present
- Modeling information
- Height: 1.76 m (5 ft 9 1/2 in)
- Hair color: Dark blonde
- Eye color: Hazel
- Agency: The Lions (New York, Los Angeles); Oui Management (Paris); Monster Management (Milan); Premier Model Management (London); Elite Model Management (Barcelona); Model Management (Hamburg); Munich Models (Munich); MIKAs (Stockholm)

Dorothea Barth Jörgensen is a Swedish model. In 2007, she won the Swedish Elite Model Look. The year after, she signed with the modelling agency Elite Model Management. She frequently works for Victoria's Secret.

== Early life ==
In 2007, she won the Swedish Edition of the Elite Model Look contest.

== Career ==
She started at New York Fashion Week in February 2009, walking for BCBG Max Azria, Calvin Klein, Jonathan Saunders, Marc Jacobs and Proenza Schouler. That same month, in Milan, she opened for Sportmax and walked for Prada, Jil Sander, Missoni and Pringle of Scotland. In Paris, she closed Anne Valerie Hash and walked for Chanel, Dries Van Noten, Kenzo, Lanvin, Louis Vuitton and Miu Miu. It was her first season and she walked more than 40 shows. She is then noticed by Models.com which features her as "top ten newcomers", and Style.com which tells she's a rising star.

At age 18, she moved to New York City and signed with Women Management.

In 2009 and 2012, she walked for the Victoria's Secret Fashion Show.

She has since appeared in adverts for Alberta Ferretti, Burberry, H&M, J.Lindeberg, The Row or Vera Wang and walked for Acne, DKNY, Matthew Williamson, Oscar de la Renta, Philosophy, Rag & Bone, Rick Owens, Rochas, Topshop and Vanessa Bruno.

She has been featured in magazines such as Another Magazine, British Vogue, Elle, Harper's Bazaar, Interview Magazine, The New York Times, V Magazine, Vogue Italia, and W Magazine.
