= Ieva Lagūna =

Latvian model

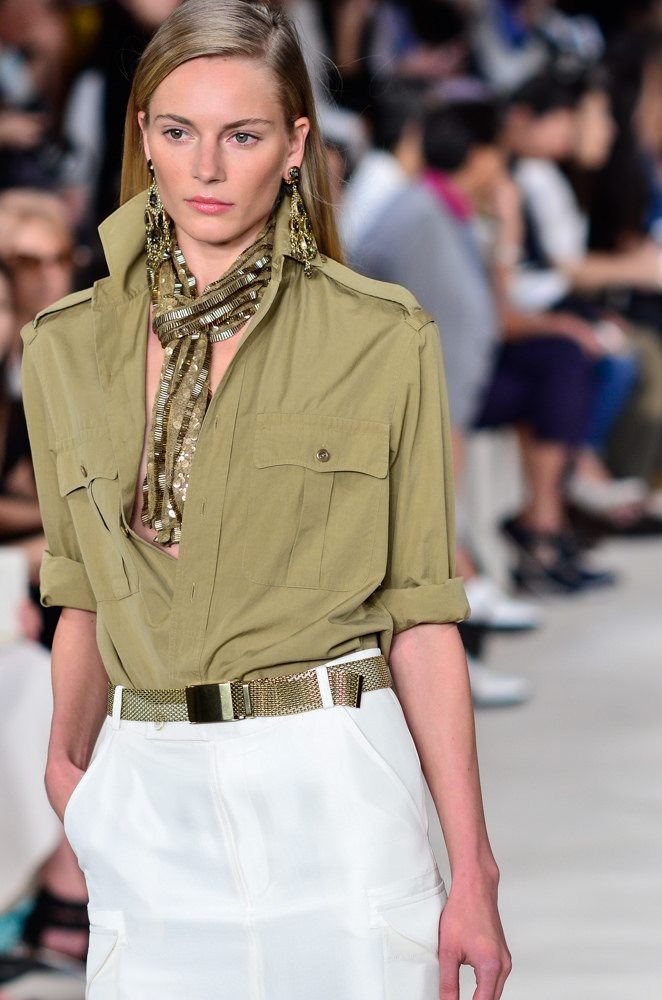
- Ieva Lagūna in 2014
- Born: 6 June 1990 (age 34); Saldus, Latvia
- Occupation: Model
- Years active: 2007–present
- Modeling information
- Height: 1.77 m (5 ft 9 1/2 in)
- Hair color: Dark blonde
- Eye color: Green
- Agency: Supreme Management (New York); Elite Model Management (Paris); Women Management (Milan); Select Model Management (London); Uno Models (Barcelona); Starsystem (Geneve); Modelink (Gothenburg); Model Management (Hamburg); Public Image Management (Montreal); MP Stockholm (Stockholm)

Ieva Lagūna (born 6 June 1990) is a Latvian model. Lagūna participated in 2011 Victoria's Secret Fashion Show.

== Biography ==
Lagūna was born in Saldus, Latvia, and began her modeling career in 2007 when she was scouted during the MTV/B-day festival in Riga by Nils Raumanis, the founder of DANDY model management. She later signed with WOMEN model management in Milan. Her runway debut was at the Spring 2008 London fashion Week in the Burberry anniversary fashion show. In 2008 she signed with model agency Women Management Paris and SUPREME Model Management in New York. Laguna has since walked in shows for designers such as Shiatzy Chen, Christian Dior, Nina Ricci, Dolce & Gabbana, Victoria's Secret, Versace, Carolina Herrera, and Michael Kors.

Laguna has been featured on the cover of Vogue Germany, Vogue Greece, Rush magazine, Elle France, and Marie Claire Italy.
