= Shannan Click =

American model (born 1983)

- Born: Shannan Marie Click; November 17, 1983 (age 42); San Dimas, California, U.S.
- Partner: Jack Huston (m. 2022)
- Children: Daughter; Son
- Modeling information
- Height: 1.77 m (5 ft 9 1/2 in)
- Hair color: Brown
- Eye color: Green
- Agency: Elite Model Management (New York); Marilyn Agency (Paris); Why Not Model Management (Milan); Storm Model Management (London); Traffic Models (Barcelona); Iconic Management (Berlin); M4 Models (Hamburg); Two Management (Los Angeles); MP Stockholm (Stockholm)

Shannan Marie Click (born November 17, 1983) is an American model. She has appeared in a variety of international editions of Vogue (including Vogue Italia) and the 2008, 2009, 2010 and 2011 Victoria's Secret Fashion Show.

== Early life and discovery ==
Click was born on November 17, 1983, in San Dimas, California. She was discovered by an agent while at Huntington Beach.

== Career ==
Click's first major modeling gig was with GUESS?. A year later, she began her international runway career, walking for designers like Miu Miu, Prada, Alexander McQueen, and Luella Bartley. She has walked in other seasons for many fashion houses, such as Yves Saint Laurent, Dior Cosmetics, Chanel, and Louis Vuitton.

Her most recent campaign work includes Pepe Jeans, Pretty by Elizabeth Arden, GAP, and Tommy Hilfiger. Other campaigns include Levi's, Emporio Armani, H&M, Dolce & Gabbana, Burberry, Dior Cosmetics, and Biotherm.

== Personal life ==
Click began dating English actor Jack Huston in 2011. Click and Huston have a daughter and a son. The couple married in 2022 in Las Vegas.
