= Alanna Arrington =

American model from Cedar Rapids, Iowa

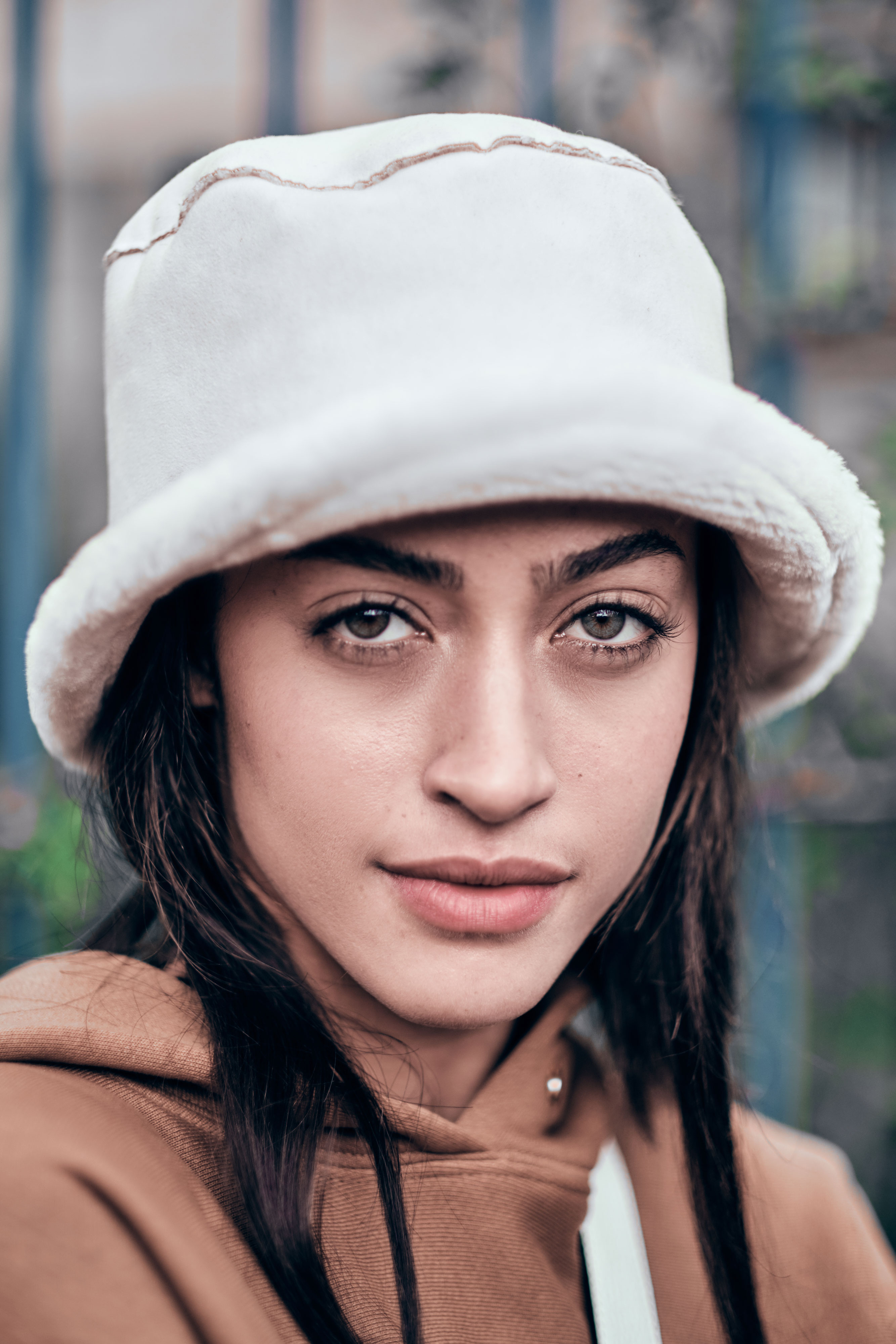
- Arrington in 2019
- Born: Alanna Lynn Arrington; November 18, 1998 (age 27); Cedar Rapids, Iowa, U.S.
- Modeling information
- Height: 1.78 m (5 ft 10 in)
- Hair color: Brown
- Eye color: Hazel
- Agency: Next Model Management (New York, Paris, Milan, London, Los Angeles, Miami); MIKAs (Stockholm); Mother Management (St. Louis)

Alanna Lynn Arrington (born November 18, 1998) is an American model from Cedar Rapids, Iowa. She has been on the cover of Maxim and Elle U.K. She is a model for Victoria's Secret.

== Early life ==
Born to Anthony and Amy Arrington, Arrington has one sister named Amyah. Arrington is biracial. She attended Erskine Elementary School, McKinley Middle School, and Washington High School in Cedar Rapids and was on their varsity basketball team.

== Career ==
Arrington was scouted by the talent agents Jeff and Mary Clarke of Mother Model Management, in St Louis, Missouri. She subsequently signed to Next Model Management. She first worked in Los Angeles before moving to New York City to do high fashion modeling.

Arrington debuted during the 2016 F/W ready-to-wear collections, opening the Altuzarra show. She walked over 20 shows that season, including Chanel, Tommy Hilfiger, Louis Vuitton, Etro, Céline and Diane Von Furstenberg. Since then she has walked the runway for Missoni, Max Mara, Mulberry, Tom Ford, Alberta Ferretti, Stella McCartney, Balmain, Roland Mouret, and Yeezy.

Arrington has appeared in editorials for magazines such as Vogue, British Vogue, Vogue España, Vogue Russia, Teen Vogue, Harper’s Bazaar, Elle, Interview, Allure, i-D, and Wonderland Magazine. Arrington has appeared in advertisements for Polo Ralph Lauren, Gap Inc., Urban Outfitters, DKNY, Mango, Stella McCartney, H&M, Levi’s, Express, and Aldo.

She walked the 2016-2018 Victoria's Secret Fashion Shows.

She is ranked as a "Money" girl on models.com.

In 2017, she was chosen as one of the "11 Models You Need to Know" by Vogue Arabia.
