= Mayowa Nicholas =

Nigerian model

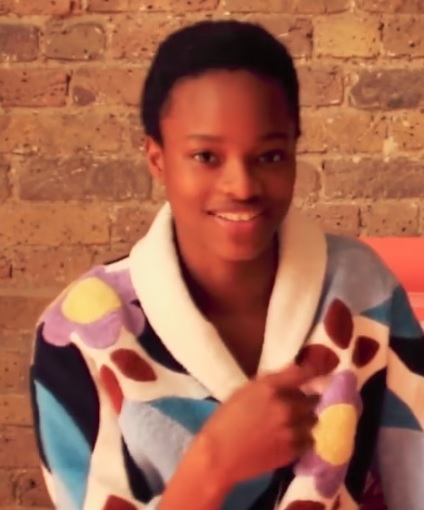
- Mayowa Nicholas interviewed by Love magazine in 2017
- Born: 22 May 1998 (age 28); Lagos, Nigeria
- Modeling information
- Height: 1.80 m (5 ft 11 in)
- Hair color: Brown
- Eye color: Brown
- Agency: The Society Management (New York); Elite Model Management (Paris, Milan, London, Amsterdam, Barcelona, Copenhagen); Beth Model Management Africa (Lagos)

Mayowa Nicholas (22 May 1998) is a Nigerian fashion model. She is the first Nigerian model to star in a Dolce & Gabbana, Saint Laurent, and Calvin Klein campaigns.

== Career ==
Mayowa Nicholas was a finalist of the 2014 Elite Model Look contest (along with Italian model Greta Varlese).

In her first runway season, 2015, she appeared in shows for Balmain, Balenciaga, Calvin Klein, Kenzo, Hermès, and Acne Studios among others. More recently, she has worked with high-profile designers like Prada, Miu Miu, Versace, Chanel, Michael Kors, and Oscar de la Renta. She has also starred in a Dolce & Gabbana campaign.

She was supposed to make her debut in the 2017 Victoria's Secret Fashion Show, but days before the show, her visa to travel to China was rejected, along with several Russian and Ukrainian models, which prevented her from walking the show. She officially made her debut in the 2018 Victoria’s Secret Fashion Show.

Nicholas is currently ranked as one of Models.com's "Top 50" models.
