= Gracie Carvalho =

Brazilian model

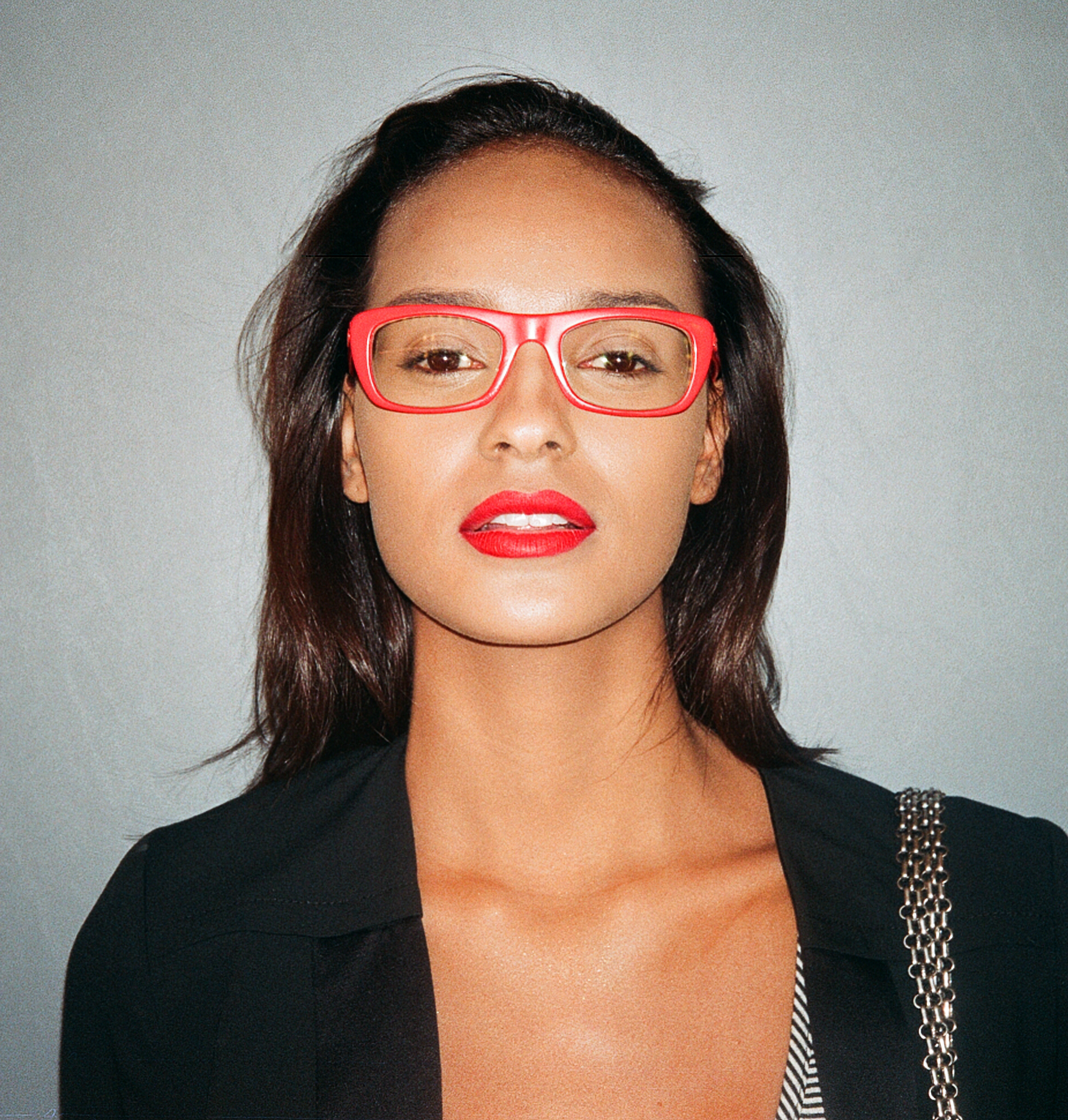
- Born: July 23, 1990 (age 36); Campinas, São Paulo, Brazil
- Years active: 2007–present
- Modeling information
- Hair color: brown
- Eye color: brown
- Agency: The Lions (New York, Los Angeles); Oui Management (Paris); Why Not Model Management (Milan); Select Model Management (London)

Gracie Carvalho (born July 23, 1990, in Campinas, São Paulo, Brazil) is a Brazilian model.

== Career ==
Gracie Carvalho started modeling in 2007, at the age of 18, in São Paulo after entering a local contest. She made her debut at Fashion Week in 2008. She was the most in-demand model during the June Rio Fashion Week, walking 35 of the 39 fashion shows. After this success during Fashion Week and her cover of L'Officiel and editorials in Vogue and Elle, she signed with Marilyn Agency. She has since then walked for several designers including Burberry, Karl Lagerfeld, Ralph Lauren, Vera Wang, and Vivienne Westwood.

She walked the runways of New York and Paris Fashion Weeks for the first time for the season Fall 2009, for designers including Carolina Herrera, Max Azria, Giambattista Valli and Stella McCartney, and she was the only model of color to walk for Miu Miu. She was the face of DKNY in 2009 and 2010, and of Tommy Hilfiger in 2010.

She is renowned for her work as a lingerie, swimsuit and catalogue model, posing for H&M, Next and Calzedonia. She walked the Victoria's Secret Fashion Show in 2010 and 2015. She was also featured in the 2010 Pirelli Calendar.

She practices Muay Thai and jiu-jitsu, which made her become the face of Marshawn Lynch's sports brand Beast Model in 2017.
