= Jourdana Phillips =

American model (born 1990)

- Born: July 6, 1990 (age 35); New York City, U.S.
- Occupation: Model
- Known for: Victoria's Secret Fashion Show, 2016–18
- Modeling information
- Height: 1.78 m (5 ft 10 in)
- Hair color: Black
- Eye color: Brown
- Agency: Elite Model Management (New York); Women Management (Paris, Milan); Models 1 (London); Modelwerk (Hamburg); Nomad Management (Los Angeles, Miami); TFM (Oslo)

Jourdana Elizabeth Phillips (born 1990) is an American model.

== Early life ==
Jourdana Phillips was born in Co-op City, Bronx in New York she lived there till age 6 then moved to Maplewood, New Jersey. She moved to Houston, Texas at 11 years old where she attended school and later graduated from Elkins High School.

She then moved to New York City where she attended New York University. She completed a bachelor's degree in Childhood Education in 2015.

== Modelling ==
In 2016 she signed with Supreme Management in New York, as well as Women Management in Milan and Paris and Models 1 in London.

She has featured in editorials for Vogue, Elle and Harper’s Bazaar among others and walked in shows for Yves Saint Laurent, Balmain, Ralph Lauren, Emporio Armani, Elie Saab, Marc Jacobs, Cushnie, Topshop, Acne Studios, Tod's, Yeezy and others. She appeared in the annual Victoria’s Secret Fashion Show in 2016, 2017 and 2018.
