= Neelam Gill =

British fashion model (born 1995)

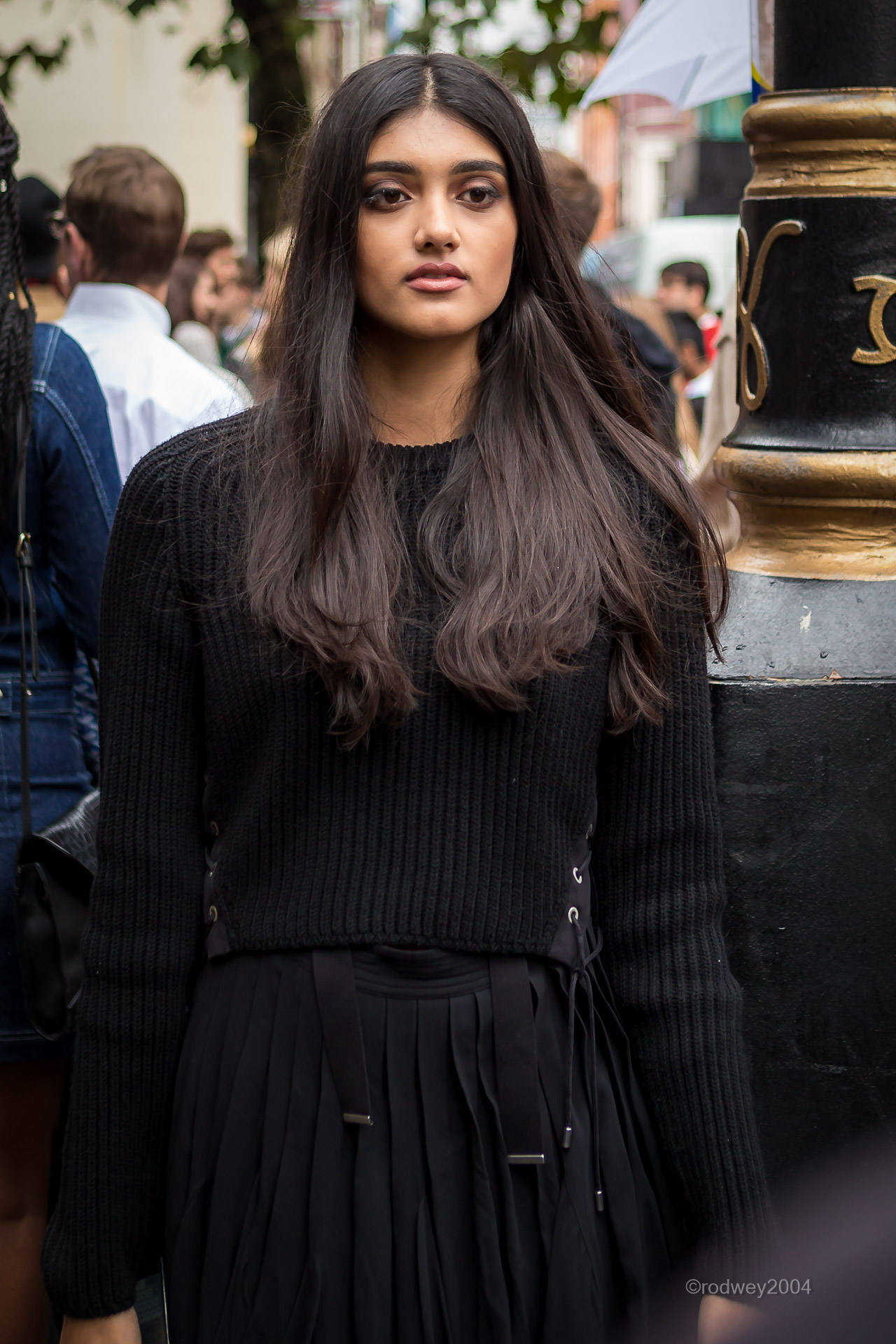
- Gill in 2015
- Born: Neelam Kaur Gill; 27 April 1995 (age 31); Coventry, England
- Occupations: Fashion model; activist
- Years active: 2011–present
- Modeling information
- Height: 5 ft 10 in (178 cm)
- Hair color: Brown
- Eye color: Brown
- Agency: CAA (New York); IMM Bruxelles (Brussels); Le Management (Copenhagen)

Neelam Kaur Gill (born 27 April 1995) is a British fashion model and activist of Punjabi descent. She has worked with Burberry, Abercrombie & Fitch and appeared in Vogue magazine.

== Early life ==
Neelam Kaur Gill was born in Coventry, West Midlands, England on 27 April 1995. Her grandparents were born in India and are Sikhs from Punjab. She uses her stepfathers surname in her modelling career.

== Career ==
As a young teenager Gill wanted to be a fashion journalist. She was spotted at the age of thirteen by a scout at The Clothes Show Live, then at the age of fourteen, she signed with NEXT Model Management.

In September 2013, Gill made her catwalk debut for Burberry’s fashion show during London Fashion Week. In 2014, she became the first Indian model featured in a Burberry campaign. In November 2015, she became the face of Abercrombie & Fitch. Gill along with Suki Waterhouse wore sarees in a video shoot at Heathrow Airport for an advert for British Airways. In 2017 she became the first British Indian ambassador of L’Oréal Paris. In both 2024 and 2025 she walked the runway at the Victoria’s Secret Fashion Show in New York. She has also walked for Kanye West's Fashion Week Show, Indian designer Rohit Bal and Dior.

She has appeared in Vogue India, as the first Marie Claire digital cover star, and in 2017 was featured on the cover of Stylist magazine.

== Activism ==
Gill has spoken about bullying, depression and body confidence issues via her YouTube channel and also said that she "feels sorry" for online trolls.

Gill also describes herself as a "feminist" and feels that "women of colour need to talk about how they feel to people in positions of privilege who may not see things from their perspective." She has used her platform to raise awareness about the need for more diversity within the fashion industry, racism, tokenism, women's rights, sexual assault and global injustice.

== Personal life ==
In 2023, she was photographed on a yacht with Leonardo di Caprio, with public speculation they were dating, however, she disclosed she was in a "committed relationship with his good friend, and have been for many months now. The only reason we have been pictured in the same vicinity is because I have been there with my partner. I hope this clears up all the false stories."
