= Myrthe Bolt =

Dutch fashion model

- Born: 26 January 1999 (age 26); Roden, Drenthe, Netherlands
- Modeling information
- Height: 1.75 m (5 ft 9 in)
- Hair color: Blonde
- Eye color: Blue-grey
- Agency: Next Model Management (worldwide); Sight Management Studio (Barcelona); Modelwerk (Hamburg); MIKAs (Stockholm); Models Rock Agency (Heerlen) (mother agency)

Myrthe Bolt (born 26 January 1999) is a Dutch fashion model.

== Career ==
Bolt signed with Next Model Management debuted at Miu Miu S/S 2017; the next season she walked for brands including Topshop, Versus (Versace), Fendi, and The Row. She has appeared in ads for Just Cavalli, Nordstrom, and Topshop. She has appeared in editorials for CR Fashion Book, British Vogue, Vogue Paris, and WSJ.

In 2018, she walked for the Victoria's Secret Fashion Show.

== Personal life ==
Bolt is a medical student at the University of Groningen which she prioritizes over her modelling career.
