= Munich Models =

Modeling agency

MUNICH MODELS GmbH is a modeling agency based in Munich, Germany. Founded in 1992 by Susanne Maushake, the agency represents female models for editorial and commercial modelling.

== Models represented (present) ==
Munich Models represented by the agency include:

- Alexina Graham
- Candice Swanepoel
- Caroline Brasch Nielsen
- Caroline Ribeiro
- Chiara Baschetti
- Cintia Dicker
- Claudia Mason
- Daniela Peštová
- Denisa Dvořáková
- Dorothea Barth Jörgensen
- Emanuela de Paula
- Eva Klímková
- Fatima Siad
- Inés Sastre
- Joséphine Le Tutour
- Juana Burga Cervera
- Kenza Fourati
- Luisa Hartema
- Ling Tan
- Magdalena Frackowiak
- Michaela Hlaváčková
- Ming Xi
- Pauline Hoarau
- Raica Oliveira
- Ronja Furrer
- Sigrid Agren
- Tao Okamoto
- Tatjana Patitz
- Trinidad de la Noi
- Vanessa Lorenzo
- Yfke Sturm

== See also ==
- List of modeling agencies
