= Sanne Vloet =

Dutch fashion model and vlogger

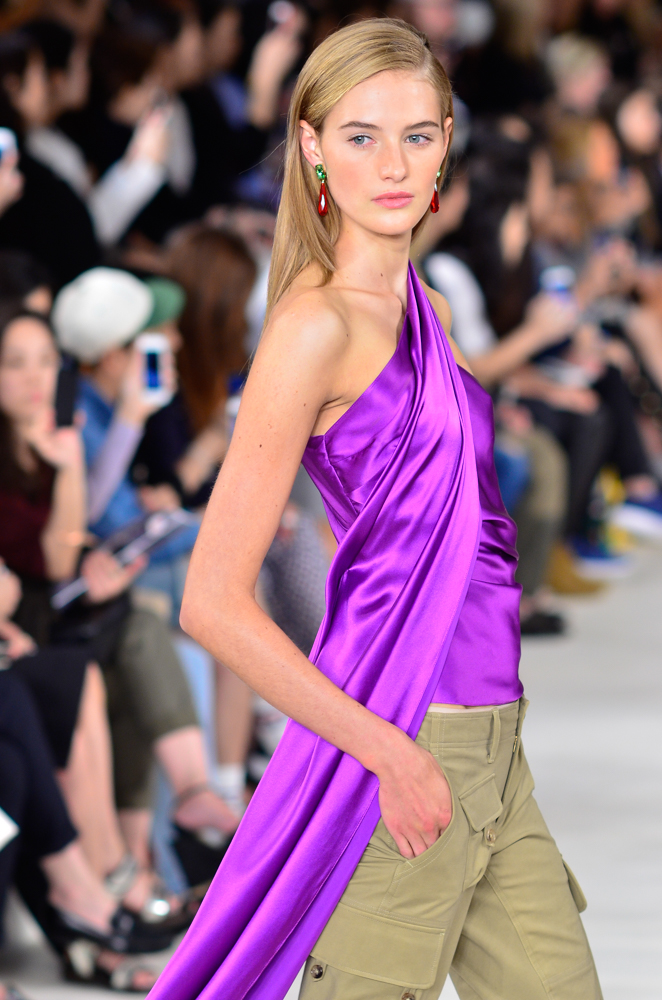
- Vloet walking for Ralph Lauren in 2014
- Born: March 10, 1995 (age 30); Switzerland
- Spouse: Max Ando (m. 2023)
- Modeling information
- Height: 1.81 m (5 ft 11 1/2 in)
- Hair color: Brown
- Eye color: Blue-green
- Agency: HEROES Model Management (New York) (mother agency); Oui Management (Paris); Monster Management (Milan)

Sanne Vloet Ando (born 10 March 1995) is a Dutch model best known for her appearances in the Victoria's Secret Fashion Show.

== Early life ==
Sanne Vloet was born in Switzerland to Dutch parents. She grew up, for a time, in Marondera, Zimbabwe. In the Netherlands, she grew up in Donkerbroek, Ooststellingwerf, Friesland. While auditioning for Holland's Got Talent, she was discovered by a modeling agent at the age of 14. To support her career, her mother would routinely bring her to Amsterdam for her photo-shoots, and seemed to be as enthusiastic about it as Sanne herself. She has one younger brother who is 2 years her junior.

When she was 15 she applied for a job in a supermarket, but later quit in order to pursue her modeling career. She is fluent in both Dutch and English.

== Career ==
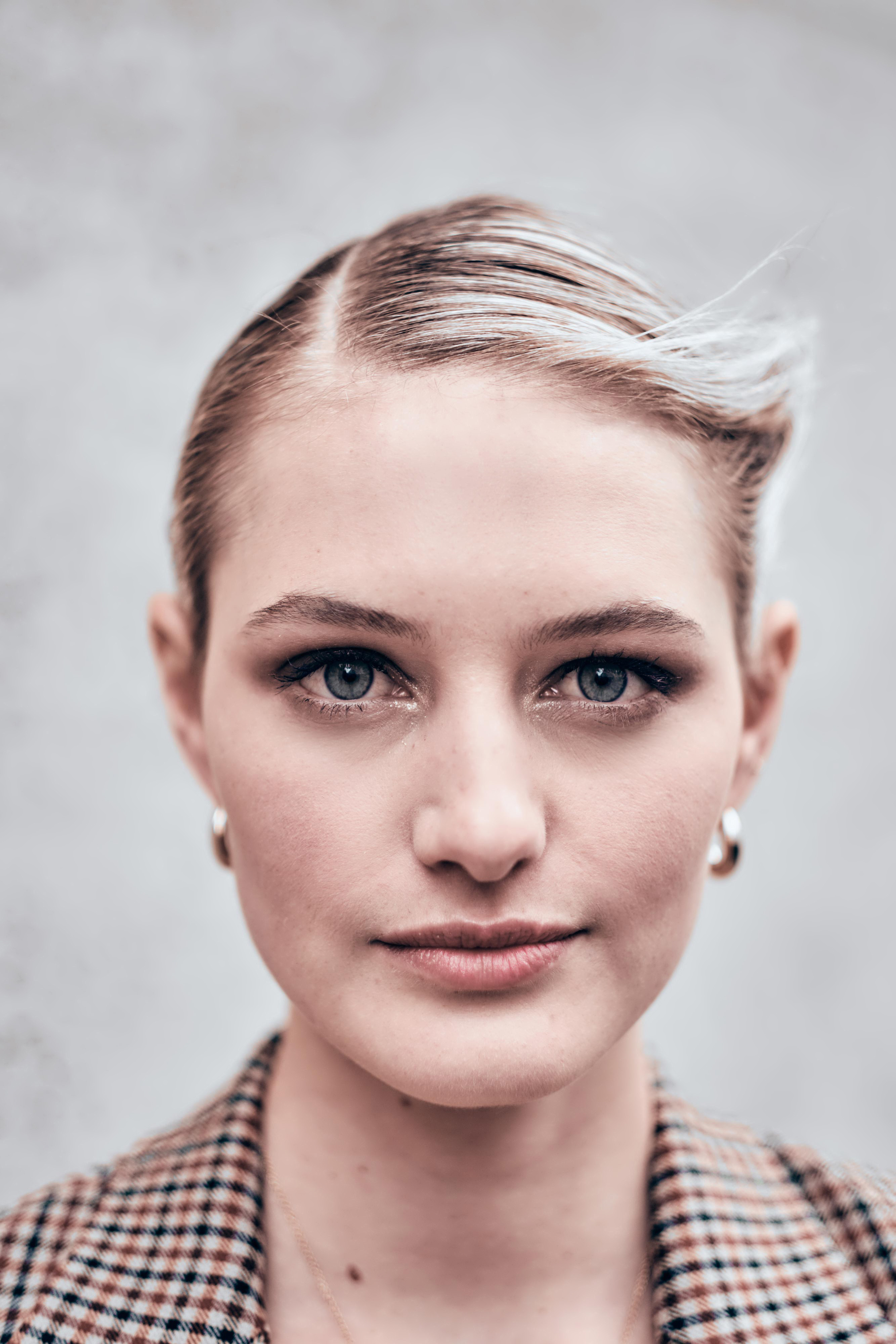
Vloet in 2019

Vloet started her international career in Paris before moving to New York City and walked for Oscar de la Renta, Rodarte, Jason Wu, Tom Ford, Dolce & Gabbana, Bottega Veneta, Marchesa and Ralph Lauren. Vloet walked in the 2015–2017 Victoria's Secret Fashion Shows in New York City, Paris, and Shanghai respectively.
