= Leilani Bishop =

American model

- Born: September 11, 1976 (age 50); Hawaii
- Modeling information
- Height: 1.73 m (5 ft 8 in)
- Hair color: Blonde
- Eye color: Green

Leilani Bishop (born September 11, 1976) is an American model. At 15, she was discovered on Kauai by model agent Cindy Kauanui of Jet Set Models and subsequently appeared on the covers of Flare and Allure magazines, and modeled for clients such as Tommy Hilfiger, Balenciaga, Esprit, and Victoria's Secret.

In 1994 Bishop appeared on the cover of Hole's album Live Through This dressed in beauty pageant attire, with mascara running down her face. She was photographed by Ellen von Unwerth.

In 2000, she played the role of Resin, "the rudest and most selfish and narcissistic cover girl ever to sulk down a runaway," in the movie The Intern.

She is the founder and president of Women for the World, a non-profit organization based in Santa Monica, California. In 2012, Bishop created the Leilani Bishop Collection of fragrances.
