= Daniela Peštová =

Czech model (born 1970)

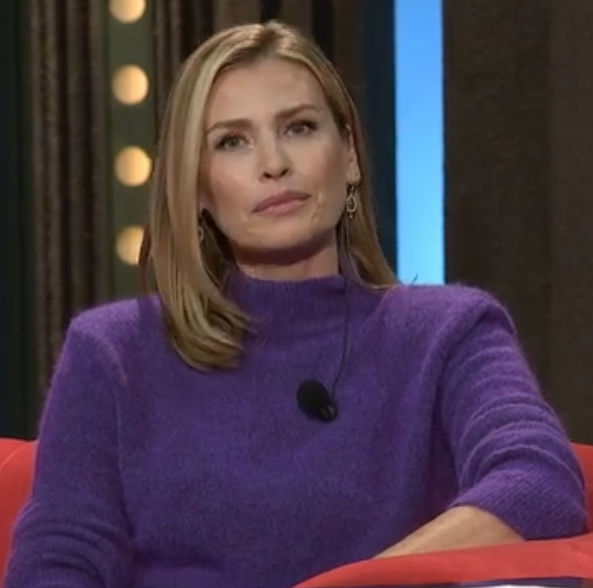
- On Show Jana Krause in 2022
- Born: 14 October 1970 (age 55); Teplice, Czechoslovakia
- Spouse: Tommaso Buti (m. 1995; div. 1998)
- Partner: Pavol Habera (2000–present)
- Children: 3
- Modeling information
- Height: 5 ft 11 in (1.80 m)
- Hair color: Blonde
- Eye color: Blue
- Agency: Muse Management Inc. (New York); Karin Models (Paris); Women Direct (Milan); Elite Model Management (Prague, London, Amsterdam); View Management (Barcelona); Modellink (Gothenburg); Modelwerk (Hamburg); Munich Models (Munich); STARS Model Management (San Francisco); MP Stockholm (Stockholm); Visage Management (Zurich)

Daniela Peštová (born 14 October 1970) is a Czech model. She was born in Teplice, Czechoslovakia, and was discovered by the Madison Modeling Agency.

== Career ==
External images
- Peštová's Sports Illustrated Swimsuit Issue cover from 20 February 1995
- Peštová's Sports Illustrated Swimsuit Issue cover from 1 February 2000
- Peštová's Sports Illustrated Swimsuit Issue cover from 17 February 2006

She has appeared on the covers of GQ, Marie Claire, Cosmopolitan, Glamour and Elle. She has appeared in the Sports Illustrated Swimsuit Issue, and has been featured on the cover three times, in 1995, 2000 and 2006. In addition to working with photographers on her Sports Illustrated shoots, she was the subject of Joanne Gair's inaugural body painting works as part of the Sports Illustrated Swimsuit Issue. She has modelled for L'Oréal and Victoria's Secret.

== Personal life ==
Peštová married Tommaso Buti (former CEO of Fashion Café) in 1995, but they were divorced in 1998. The couple had a son, Yannick Fausto (b. 1996).

With Slovak singer Pavol Habera, frontman of Slovak band TEAM, Peštová has a daughter, Ella Joy (born 21 July 2002) and a son, Paul Henry (born 2009).
