= Morgane Dubled =

French model

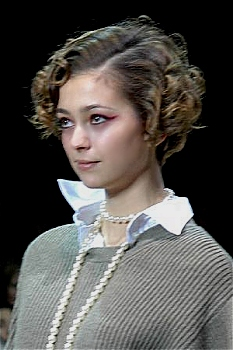
- Born: 1 July 1984 (age 42); Nice, France
- Modeling information
- Height: 1.80 m (5 ft 11 in)
- Hair color: Dark brown
- Eye color: Brown
- Agency: Supreme Management (Paris); MIKAs (Stockholm)

Morgane Dubled (born 1 July 1984) is a French model.

== Early life ==
Dubled was first scouted at the age of 16 by top scout G. Simon Chafik for Elite Model Management in her hometown of Nice, France, in 2001. After getting her Baccalauréat (scientific section), she attended the medical school Faculté de Médecine de Nice, but after one year changed direction and moved to Paris for a year in Hypokhâgne, preparing the École Normale Supérieure. She started modeling as a part-time job to pay for her studies, but soon her interest in the modeling world rose and she decided to do it full-time.

== Modeling ==
Since her first catwalk season in 2004, she has become a popular runway model, walking for the likes of Armani, Calvin Klein, Chanel, Christian Lacroix, Dolce & Gabbana, Dior, Elie Saab, Emanuel Ungaro, Fendi, Gucci, Hermès, Jean-Paul Gaultier, John Galliano, Lacoste, Lanvin, Kenzo, Marc Jacobs, Marc by Marc Jacobs, Michael Kors, Nina Ricci, Ralph Lauren, Sonia Rykiel, Stella McCartney, Versace, and Viktor & Rolf.

She has done editorial work with notable photographers like Terry Richardson, Craig McDean, Mark Abrahams, John Akehurst, Eric Maillet, David Sims. She also appeared on the cover of Russian Vogue and has done campaign work for Dior, Dolce & Gabbana, just Cavalli, Jean-Paul Gaultier, and Rochas (Fragrance ad for "Soleil de Rochas", directed by Bruno Aveillan).

She participated in the 2005, 2006, 2007, and 2008 Victoria's Secret fashion shows.

Since 2009, she has walked only for Paris Fashion Week (and Couture).

=== Agencies ===
- Viva Paris (mother agency)
- DNA New York
- Why Not Milan

== See also ==
- List of Victoria's Secret models
