= Danita Angell =

American model

- Born: Danita Angell; March 26, 1981; Oregon, U.S.
- Modeling information
- Height: 1.78 m (5 ft 10 in)
- Hair color: Blonde
- Eye color: Green

Danita Angell (born March 26, 1986) is an American model. She has appeared on the cover of Vogue Italia magazine and in the 2000 Victoria's Secret Fashion Show. Angell appeared in many runway shows for high-profile designers in the late 1990s and early 2000s. Her couture runway appearances include Balmain, Chanel, Christian Lacroix, Givenchy, Valentino and Versace. She also walked in ready-to-wear shows for notable designers such as Alexander McQueen, Balenciaga, Calvin Klein, Chanel, Christian Dior, Dolce & Gabbana, Dries van Noten, Fendi, Givenchy, Gucci, Helmut Lang Jil Sander, John Galliano, Louis Vuitton, Marc Jacobs, Missoni, Miu Miu, Moschino, Oscar de la Renta, Prada, Ralph Lauren, Roberto Cavalli, Valentino, Versace, Vivienne Westwood and Yves St. Laurent. She has also appeared in advertising for designers including Missoni, Roberto Cavalli and Versace. She was named as a new millennium it girl by Harper's Bazaar along with Kate Moss and Amber Valletta, and was photographed with Caroline Ribeiro by Steven Meisel for Vogue Italia's editorial 'Danger High Voltage' in December 1999. In 2001, she was photographed for the New York Times Magazine twice, in February in the Doris Duke home, and in October in the Mark Twain House.
