= Pauline Hoarau =

French model (born 1994)

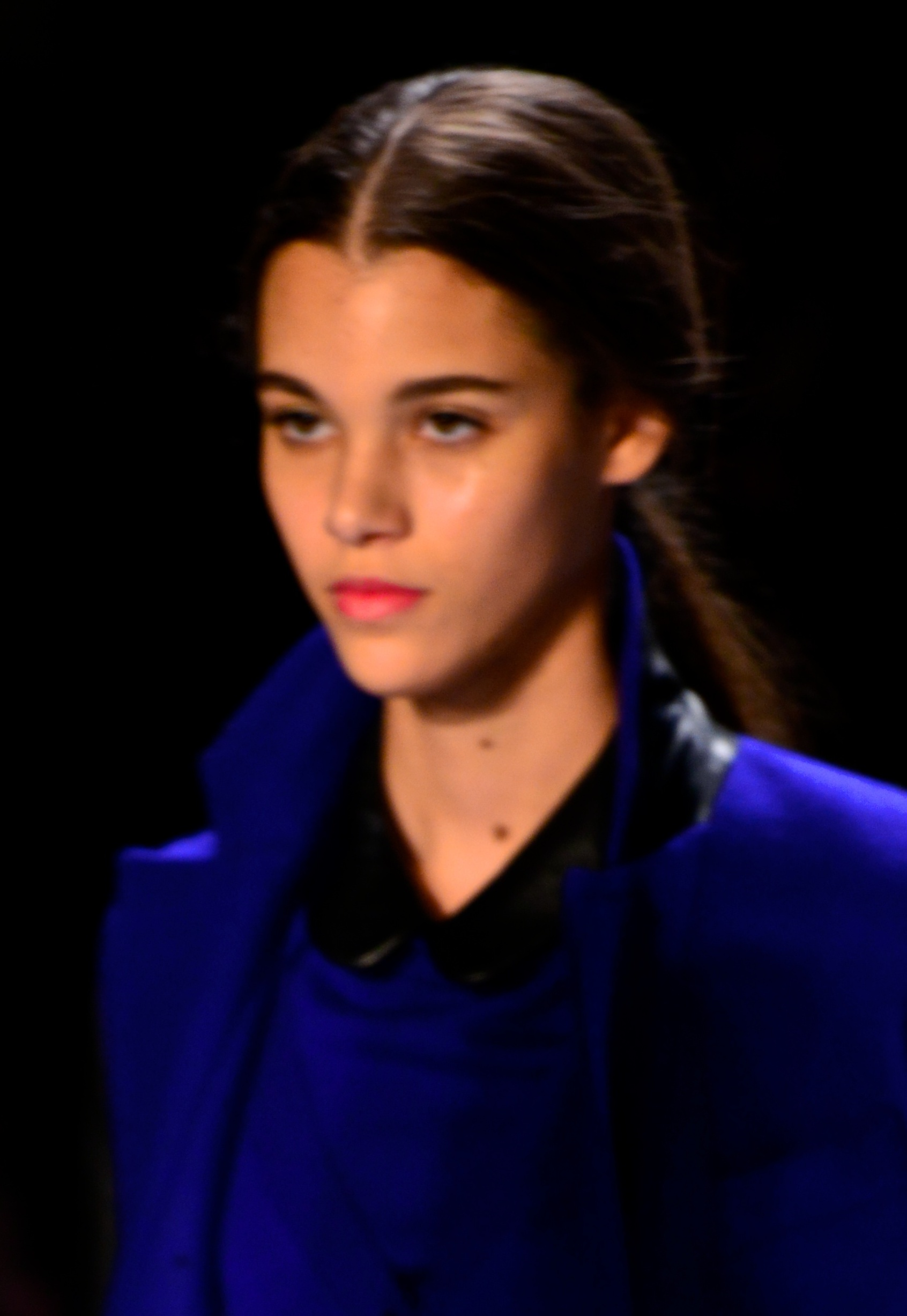
- Born: 3 February 1994 (age 32); Réunion
- Years active: 2011–present
- Known for: Elite Model Look
- Spouse: Simon Thoret (m. 2022)
- Children: 1
- Modeling information
- Height: 1.81 m (5 ft 11 1/2 in)
- Hair color: Light brown
- Eye color: Dark brown
- Agency: New York Model Management (New York); Next Model Management (Paris); Elite Model Management (Milan, Barcelona, Copenhagen); The Squad (London); Model Management (Hamburg); Two Management (Los Angeles); Munich Models (Munich)

Pauline Hoarau (born 3 February 1994) is a French model from Réunion.

== Career ==
In 2011, Hoarau won the Elite Model Look contest in Réunion and represented Elite Model Management at the international final. She placed in the top 5 and signed contracts with several agencies of Elite.

She was nominated at the Melty Future Awards 2014.

In 2017, she appeared in Luc Besson's Valerian and the City of a Thousand Planets

She has advertised Armani Exchange, H&M, Jason Wu, Ralph Lauren, Tommy Hilfiger and Topshop, and participated in more than 200 fashion shows.

She has been on the covers of Elle (France, Italia, Mexico) and French Revue des Modes. She has also been featured in editorials for Amica, CR Fashion Book, Crash Magazine, Elle (France, Italia, Mexico, Vietnam), Glass Magazine, Harper's Bazaar (US, UK), Interview (Germany, Russia, US), LOVE, Numéro, SKP Magazine, Teen Vogue, Vogue Japan and Wonderland Magazine.

== Personal life ==
On 12 March 2021, Hoarau and her partner, Simon Thoret, announced that they were expecting their first child. She gave birth to their son on 4 July 2021. The couple married in May 2022.
