= Herieth Paul =

Tanzanian model (born 1995)

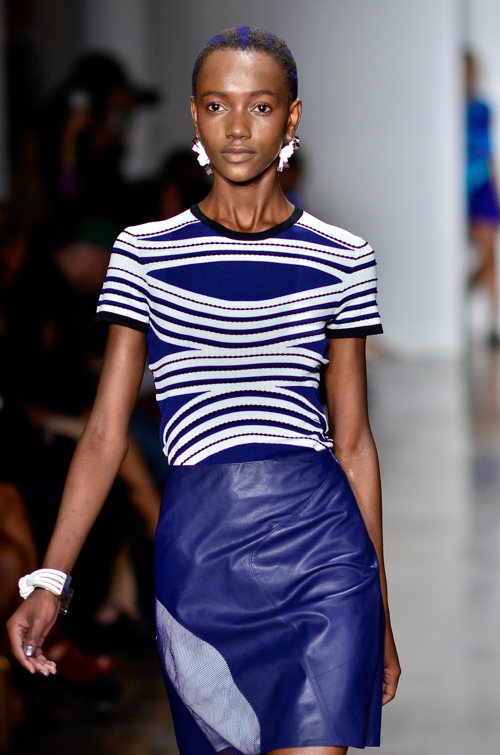
- Model Herieth Paul at the Ohne Titel Spring/Summer 2014 fashion show on September 9, 2013 at New York Fashion Week. Photo by Christopher Macsurak.
- Born: December 14, 1995 (age 30); Dar Es Salaam, Tanzania
- Occupation: Model
- Partner: Monywiir Deng Dharjang (2018–present)
- Children: 2
- Modeling information
- Height: 1.80 m (5 ft 11 in)
- Hair color: Black
- Eye color: Brown
- Agency: Select Model Management (Paris, Miami); Elite Model Management (New York); Women Management (Milan); The Squad Management (London); Uno Models (Barcelona); Scoop Models (Copenhagen); M4 Models (Hamburg); Folio Montreal (Montreal); AMTI: Toronto(Toronto)

Herieth Paul (born December 14, 1995) is a Tanzanian model who has walked for Diane von Fürstenberg, Lacoste, Tom Ford, Calvin Klein, Armani, Cavalli and 3.1 Phillip Lim. She moved to Ottawa, Ontario, Canada at the age of 14 due to her mother being a diplomat. She was discovered when she went to an open call at Angie's AMTI, a model agency based in Ottawa, Ontario, Canada. She signed with Women Management New York in June 2010. Paul has appeared in editorials for Vogue Italia magazine, i-D, wonderland and Teen Vogue. Paul appeared on a Vogue Italia cover with Arizona Muse and Freja Beha. In July 2011 she was the cover model of Canadian Elle. The caption on the cover read: "Naomi Move Over . Why We're Hot For Herieth." Paul was one of three models in the Tom Ford Fall/Winter 2013 campaign, photographed by Tom Ford. This campaign was named one of the top ten campaigns of Fall 2013 by The Business of Fashion and by Racked.com. Herieth has appeared in beauty campaigns for cKone and Tom Ford. In 2016 Herieth signed a contract with Maybelline New York cosmetics company and she is now known as one of the brand's global spokespeople.

== Personal life ==
Paul's mother, Nsia Paul is a diplomat at the Tanzania High Commission Ottawa. She has a sister named Happiness Floyd.

Since the end of 2018, she has been in a relationship with the South Sudanese model, Monywiir Deng Dharjang, who in May 2020 announced that they were expecting a child, born on February 10, 2021.
