= Ingūna Butāne =

Latvian model

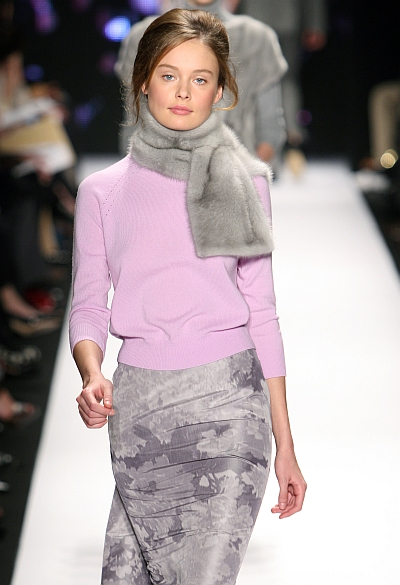
- Ingūna Butāne in Michael Kors Fall Collection.
- Born: February 24, 1986 (age 40); Riga, Latvian SSR, USSR
- Modeling information
- Height: 1.77 m (5 ft 9 1/2 in)
- Hair color: Brown
- Eye color: Blue
- Agency: One Management (New York); One Management (London); One Management (Barcelona); Marilyn Agency (Paris); d'management group (Milan); Modellink (Gothenburg); Model Management (Hamburg); Public Image Management (Montreal); ELY Management (Prague); MP Stockholm (Stockholm)

Ingūna Butāne (born February 24, 1986), sometimes simply known as Inguna, is a Latvian model.

== Career ==
Butāne was discovered when a contest was held in Latvia, where she met agents from Women Management in Milan, Italy, but decided to finish her degree of Interior Design. She then went to Moscow, Russia, and subsequently to New York, USA, to start her career.

She has been in ad campaigns for Armani Jeans, Bergdorf Goodman, Dolce & Gabbana, L'Oréal, Marc (a second line of Marc Jacobs), and Neiman Marcus. Her runway work includes Fendi, Alexander McQueen, Viktor and Rolf, Yohji Yamamoto, Alice Roi, Baby Phat, Belstaff, Gucci, Versace, and Oscar de la Renta. She is currently signed with Mother New York.

In 2005 Butāne worked with Steven Meisel as part of the 80-page "Makeover Madness" feature in Italian Vogue, which also included Linda Evangelista and Jessica Stam. In 2007 she worked with Annie Leibovitz on an ad campaign for Bottega Veneta, along with Anja Rubik, Kim Noorda, and Noah Mills.

She walked in the Victoria's Secret Fashion Show in 2005, 2007 and 2008.

== Personal life ==
Butāne is the daughter of a professional violinist. She played the violin when she was young. She loves to listen to classical music.
