= Victoria's Secret Fashion Show 2013 =

American lingerie show

- Status: Active
- Genre: Fashion show
- Date: November 13, 2013
- Frequency: Annually
- Venue: 69th Regiment Armory
- Locations: New York City, United States
- Years active: 1995–2003, 2005–2018, 2024–present
- Inaugurated: August 1, 1995
- Most recent: 2026
- Previous event: 2012
- Next event: 2014
- Member: Victoria's Secret
- Website: Victoria's Secret Fashion Show

Victoria's Secret Angels 2013
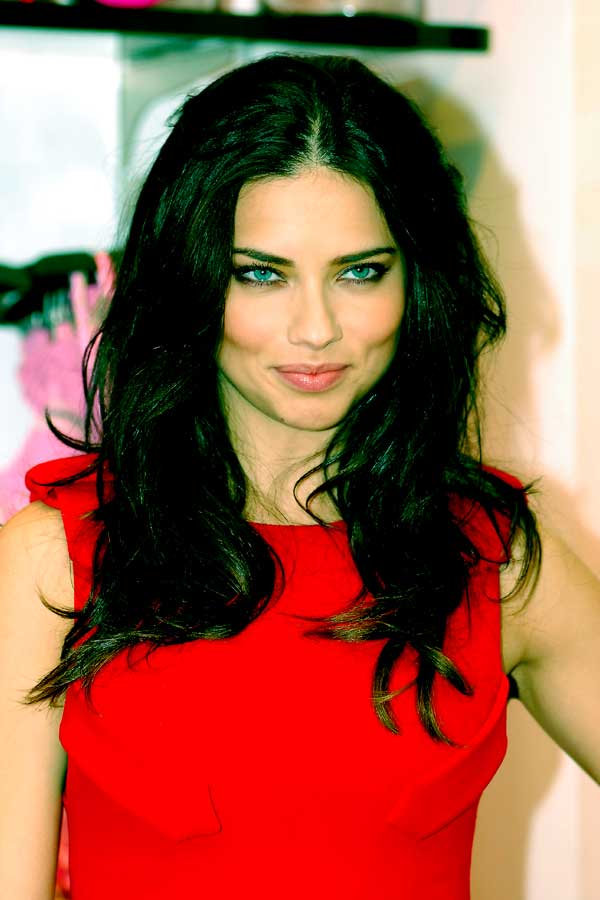
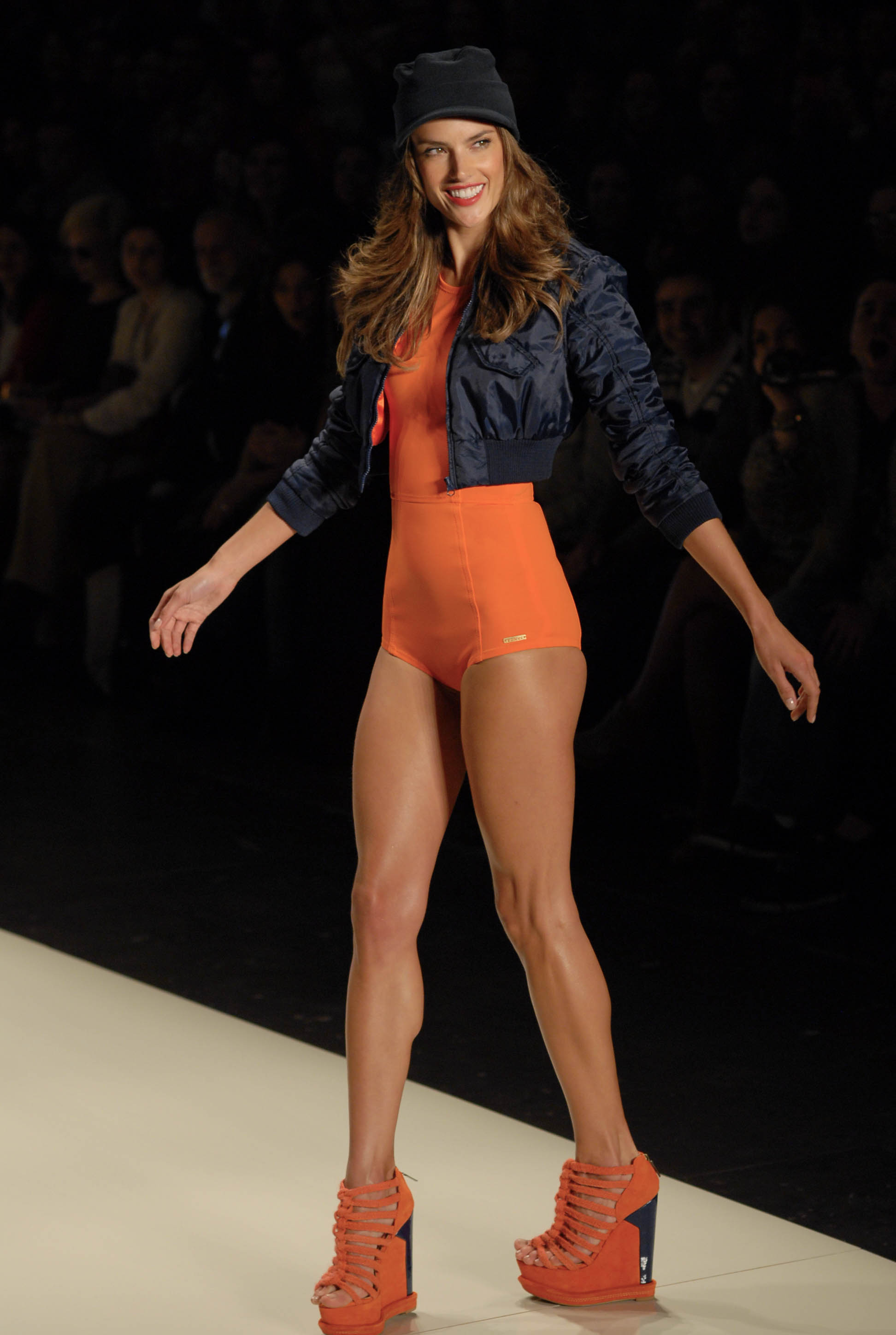
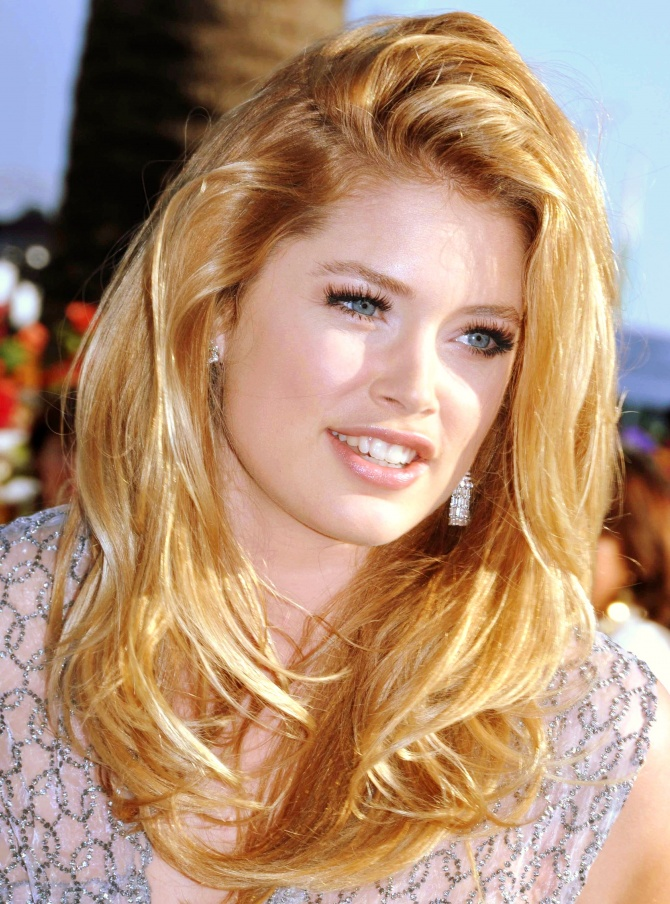
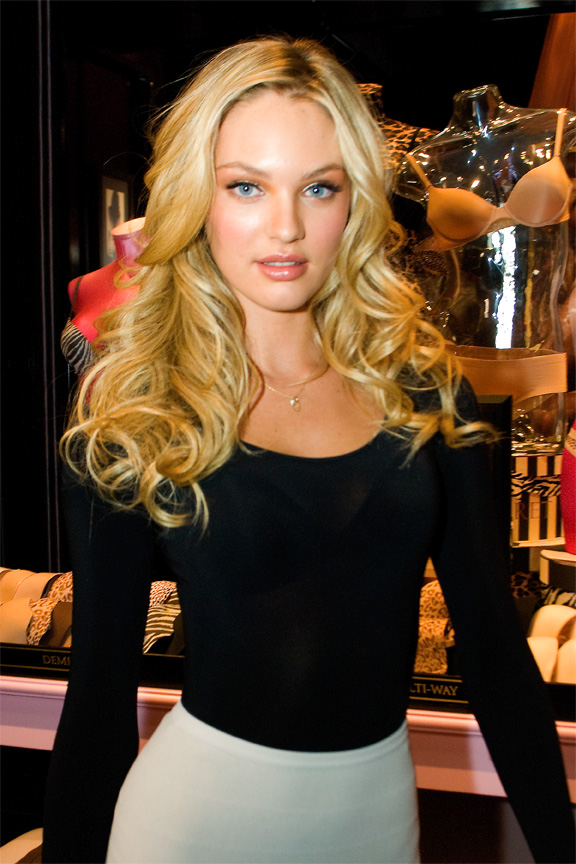
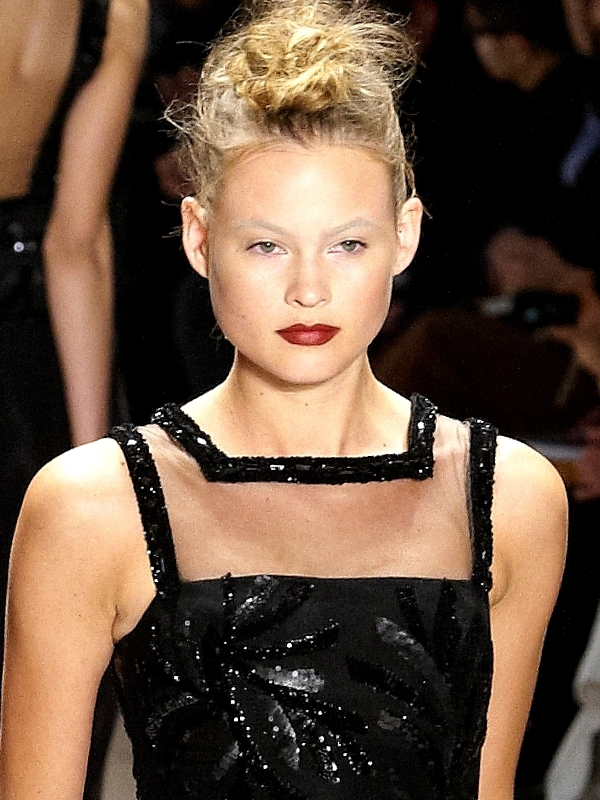
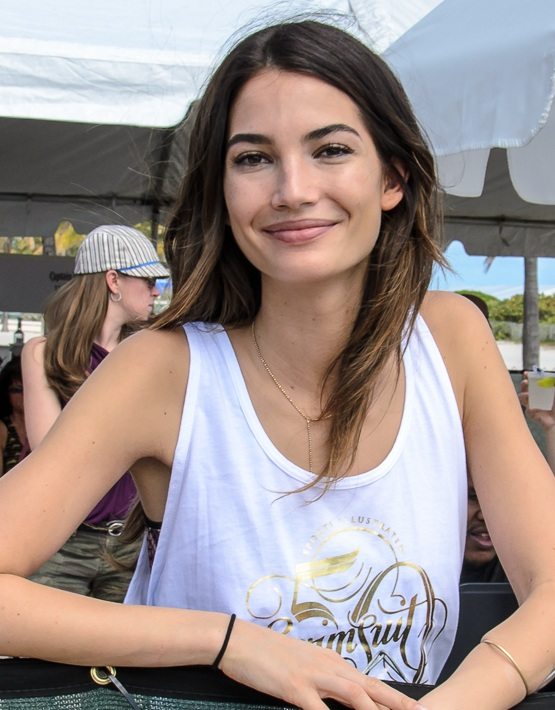
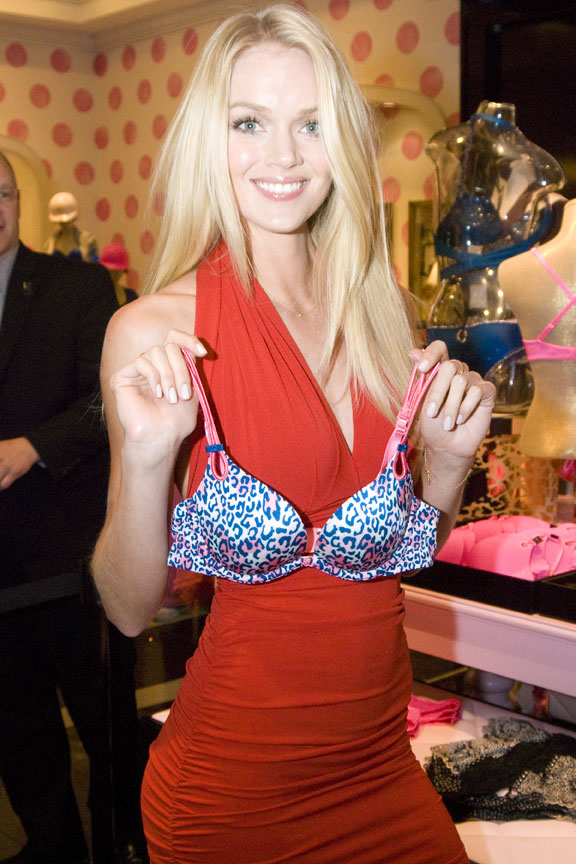
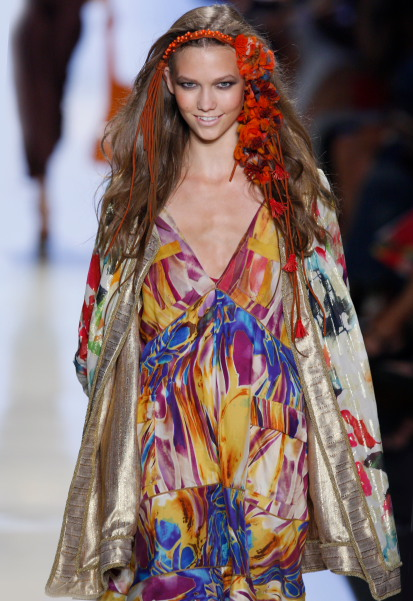

The Victoria's Secret Fashion Show is an annual fashion show sponsored by Victoria's Secret, a brand of lingerie and sleepwear. Victoria's Secret uses the show to promote and market its goods in high-profile settings. The show features some of the world's leading fashion models, such as current Victoria's Secret Angels Adriana Lima, Alessandra Ambrosio, Behati Prinsloo, Candice Swanepoel, Doutzen Kroes, Lily Aldridge, Lindsay Ellingson, and Karlie Kloss. Elsa Hosk received billing.

The show featured performances by Taylor Swift, Fall Out Boy, A Great Big World, and Neon Jungle.

The shoes used during this fashion show were created by Nicholas Kirkwood.

Dates	Locations	Broadcaster	Viewers (millions)	Performers
November 13, 2013 (recorded); December 10, 2013	New York City	CBS	9.72	Fall Out Boy, A Great Big World, Neon Jungle, and Taylor Swift

== Segments ==
The following listing of the segments are according to their actual order of appearance. The segments appeared partly in non-chronological order: The "Shipwrecked"-segment appeared as the second segment followed by "Parisian Nights" as third; "Birds of Paradise" as fourth and "PINK Network" as the fifth segment.

=== Segment 1: British Invasion ===
Performer(s)	Song	Status
(United States) Fall Out Boy • (United States) Taylor Swift	"My Songs Know What You Did in the Dark (Light Em Up)"	Live Performance

Nationality	Model	Wings	Runway shows	Status	Fantasy Bra	Value
(South Africa) South African	Candice Swanepoel		2007–2015 • 2017–2018 • 2024–present	VS 4 Angel (2010–2021)	Royal Fantasy Bra by Mouawad	$10,000,000
(Namibia) Namibian	Behati Prinsloo	꒰১ ໒꒱	2007–2015 • 2018 • 2024–present	VS 3 Angel (2009–2019)		
(United Kingdom) British	Lily Donaldson		2010–2016			
(United Kingdom) British	Cara Delevingne		2012–2013			
(Brazil) Brazilian	Barbara Fialho		2012–2018			
(United Kingdom) British	Jourdan Dunn		2012–2014			
(United States) American	Karlie Kloss	꒰১ ໒꒱	2011–2014 • 2017	New VS 4 Angel (2013–2015)		
(Poland) Polish	Kasia Struss		2013–2014			
(Brazil) Brazilian	Adriana Lima	꒰১ ໒꒱	1999–2003 • 2005–2008 • 2010–2018 • 2024–present	VS 2 Angel (2000–2018)		
(France) French	Cindy Bruna		2013–2018 • 2026			
(United States) American	Devon Windsor		2013–2018			
(United States) American	Lily Aldridge	꒰১ ໒꒱	2009–2017 • 2025	VS 4 Angel (2010–2018)		

=== Segment 2: Shipwrecked ===
Performer	Song	Status
(United States) A Great Big World (only Ian Axel)	"Say Something"	Live Performance

Nationality	Model	Wings	Runway shows	Status
(Netherlands) Dutch	Doutzen Kroes	꒰১ ໒꒱	2005–2006 • 2008–2009 • 2011–2014 • 2024–present	VS 3 Angel (2008–2014)
(Germany) German	Toni Garrn		2011–2013 • 2018	
(China) Chinese	Sui He		2011–2018	
(Namibia) Namibian	Behati Prinsloo		2007–2015 • 2018 • 2024–present	VS 3 Angel (2009–2019)
(South Africa) South African	Candice Swanepoel		2007–2015 • 2017–2018 • 2024–present	VS 4 Angel (2010–2021)
(United States) American	Lily Aldridge		2009–2017 • 2025	VS 4 Angel (2010–2021)
(United States) American	Karlie Kloss	꒰১ ໒꒱	2011–2014 • 2017	New VS 4 Angel (2013–2015)
(United States) American	Martha Hunt	꒰১ ໒꒱	2013–2018	✿
(France) French	Sigrid Agren		2013–2014	✿
(United States) American	Lindsay Ellingson		2007–2014	VS 4 Angel (2011–2014)
(Brazil) Brazilian	Alessandra Ambrosio		2000–2003 • 2005–2017 • 2024–present	VS 2 Angel (2004–2017)
(France) French	Constance Jablonski	꒰১ ໒꒱	2010–2015	

=== Segment 3: Parisian Nights ===
Performer	Song	Status
(United States) Miley Cyrus	"FU"	Recording

Nationality	Model	Wings	Runway shows	Status
(Brazil) Brazilian	Adriana Lima	꒰১ ໒꒱	1999–2003 • 2005–2008 • 2010–2018 • 2024–present	VS 2 Angel (2000–2018)
(Netherlands) Dutch	Doutzen Kroes		2005–06 • 2008–2009 • 2011–2014 • 2024–present	VS 3 Angel (2008–2014)
(France) French	Cindy Bruna		2013–2018 • 2026	
(Brazil) Brazilian	Lais Ribeiro		2010–2011 • 2013–2018	
(Brazil) Brazilian	Alessandra Ambrosio	꒰১ ໒꒱	2000–2003 • 2005–2017 • 2024–present	VS 2 Angel (2004–2017)
(United Kingdom) British	Jourdan Dunn		2012–2014	
(Puerto Rico) Puerto Rican	Joan Smalls		2011–2016 • 2024–present	
(Sweden) Swedish	Kelly Gale		2013–2014 • 2016–2018	
(United Kingdom) British	Cara Delevingne	꒰১ ໒꒱	2012–2013	
(Brazil) Brazilian	Izabel Goulart		2005–2016	Former VS 3 Angel (2005–2008)
(United States) American	Erin Heatherton		2008–2013	Former VS 4 Angel (2010–2013)
(Brazil) Brazilian	Barbara Fialho	꒰১ ໒꒱	2012–2018	

=== Segment 4: Birds of Paradise ===
Song List	Performance	Status
(United States) Fall Out Boy	"The Phoenix"	Live Performance

Nationality	Model	Wings	Runway shows	Status
(Brazil) Brazilian	Lais Ribeiro	꒰১ ໒꒱	2010–2011 • 2013–2018	
(Brazil) Brazilian	Alessandra Ambrosio	꒰১ ໒꒱	2000–2003 • 2005–2017 • 2024–present	VS 2 Angel (2004–2017)
(United States) American	Erin Heatherton		2008–2013	Former VS 4 Angel (2010–2013)
(United States) American	Lindsay Ellingson	꒰১ ໒꒱	2007–2014	VS 4 Angel (2011–2014)
(Brazil) Brazilian	Izabel Goulart	꒰১ ໒꒱	2005–2016	Former VS 3 Angel (2005–2008)
(Puerto Rico) Puerto Rican	Joan Smalls	꒰১ ໒꒱	2011–2016 • 2024–present	
(United States) American	Jacquelyn Jablonski	꒰১ ໒꒱	2010–2015	
(United States) American	Hilary Rhoda	꒰১ ໒꒱	2012–2013	
(Poland) Polish	Magdalena Frackowiak		2010 • 2012–2015	
(Angola) Angolan	Maria Borges	꒰১ ໒꒱	2013–2017	

=== Segment 5: PINK Network ===
Performer	Song	Status
(United Kingdom) Neon Jungle	"Trouble"	Live Performance

Nationality	Model	Wings	Runway shows	Status
(Latvia) Latvian	Ieva Laguna	꒰১ ໒꒱	2011–2014	
Australia	Jessica Hart		2012–2013	PINK Angel (2011–2013)
(China) Chinese	Ming Xi		2013–2018 • 2026	
(Denmark) Danish	Caroline Brasch Nielsen		2011 • 2013	
(United Kingdom) British	Malaika Firth		2013	
(Sweden) Swedish	Elsa Hosk	꒰১ ໒꒱	2011–2018 • 2026	★ PINK Angel (2011–2014)
(Denmark) Danish	Josephine Skriver		2013–2018 • 2024	
(United States) American	Jasmine Tookes		2012–2018 • 2024–present	
(Portugal) Portuguese	Sara Sampaio	꒰১ ໒꒱	2013–2018	
(Poland) Polish	Jac Jagaciak		2013–2015	

=== Segment 6: Snow Angels ===
Performer	Song	Status
(United States) Taylor Swift	"I Knew You Were Trouble"	Live Performance

Nationality	Model	Wings	Runway shows	Status	Swarovski Outfit	Value
(Namibia) Namibian	Behati Prinsloo	꒰১ ໒꒱	2007–2015 • 2018 • 2024–present	VS 3 Angel (2009–2019)		
(United States) American	Karlie Kloss		2011–2014 • 2017	New VS 4 Angel (2013–2015)		
(United States) American	Lindsay Ellingson		2007–2014	VS 4 Angel (2011–2014)	3D Printed Swarovski Outfit	–
(France) French	Constance Jablonski	꒰১ ໒꒱	2010–2015			
(South Africa) South African	Candice Swanepoel	꒰১ ໒꒱	2007–2015 • 2017–2018 • 2024–present	VS 4 Angel (2010–2021)		
(Germany) German	Toni Garrn	꒰১ ໒꒱	2011–2013 • 2018			
(China) Chinese	Sui He		2011–2018			
(United Kingdom) British	Lily Donaldson	꒰১ ໒꒱	2010–2016			
(Belarus) Belarusian	Maryna Linchuk		2008–2011 • 2013	ʚĭɞ		
(United States) American	Lily Aldridge	꒰১ ໒꒱	2009–2017 • 2025	VS 4 Angel (2010–2018)		
(Netherlands) Dutch	Doutzen Kroes		2005–2006 • 2008–2009 • 2011–2014 • 2024–present	VS 3 Angel (2008–2014)		
(Brazil) Brazilian	Adriana Lima	꒰১ ໒꒱	1999–2003 • 2005–2008 • 2010–2018 • 2024–present	VS 2 Angel (2000–2018)		
(Poland) Polish	Magdalena Frackowiak		2010 • 2012–2015			

== Finale ==
Performer	Song	Status
(United States) Lady Gaga	"Applause"	Recording

Model	Runway Shows	Status	Model	Runway Shows	Status
(Brazil) Adriana Lima	1999–2003 • 2005–2008 • 2010–2018 • 2024–present	VS 2 Angel (2000–2018)	(South Africa) Candice Swanepoel	2007–2015 • 2017–2018 • 2024–present	VS 4 Angel (2010–2021)
(United States) Karlie Kloss	2011–2014 • 2017	New VS 4 Angel (2013–2015)	(Namibia) Behati Prinsloo	2007–2015 • 2018 • 2024–present	VS 3 Angel (2009–2019)
(United States) Lily Aldridge	2009–2017 • 2025	VS 4 Angel (2010–2018)	(United States) Lindsay Ellingson	2007–2014	VS 4 Angel (2011–2014)
(Netherlands) Doutzen Kroes	2005–2006 • 2008–2009 • 2011–2014 • 2024–present	VS 3 Angel (2008–2014)	(Brazil) Alessandra Ambrosio	2000–2003 • 2005–2017 • 2024–present	VS 2 Angel (2004–2017)
(Poland) Magdalena Frackowiak	2010–2015		(France) Constance Jablonski	2010–2015	
(China) Sui He	2011–2018		(Germany) Toni Garrn	2011–2013	
(United Kingdom) Lily Donaldson	2010–2016		(Brazil) Lais Ribeiro	2010–2011 • 2013–2018	
(Belarus) Maryna Linchuk	2008–2011 • 2013		(Sweden) Kelly Gale	2013–2014 • 2016–2018	
(Puerto Rico) Joan Smalls	2011–2016 • 2024–present		(United Kingdom) Cara Delevingne	2012–2013	
(Brazil) Izabel Goulart	2005–2016	Former VS 3 Angel (2005–2008)	(United States) Erin Heatherton	2008–2013	Former VS 4 Angel (2010–2013)
(Brazil) Barbara Fialho	2012–2018		(France) Sigrid Agren	2013–2014	
(United Kingdom) Jourdan Dunn	2012–2014		(Angola) Maria Borges	2013–2017	
(United States) Martha Hunt	2013–2018		(United States) Hilary Rhoda	2012–2013	
(United States) Devon Windsor	2013–2018		(Poland) Kasia Struss	2013–2014	
(United States) Jacquelyn Jablonski	2010–2015		(France) Cindy Bruna	2013–2018 • 2026	
(Latvia) Ieva Laguna	2011–2014		(Sweden) Elsa Hosk	2011–2018 • 2026	★ PINK Angel (2011–2014)
(China) Ming Xi	2013–2018 • 2026		(Australia) Jessica Hart	2012–2013	PINK Angel (2011–13)
(Denmark) Josephine Skriver	2013–2018 • 2024		(Denmark) Caroline Brasch Nielsen	2011 • 2013	
(Portugal) Sara Sampaio	2013–2018		(United Kingdom) Malaika Firth	2013	
			(United States) Jasmine Tookes	2012–2018 • 2024–present	
			(Poland) Jac Jagaciak	2013–2015	

== Index ==
Symbol	Meaning
VS 2	2nd Generation Angels
VS 3	3rd Generation Angels
VS 4	4th Generation Angels
PINK	PINK Angels
★	Star Billing
ʚĭɞ	Comeback Models
✄┈	Fit Models
✿	Debuting Models
꒰১ ໒꒱	Wings
˚₊‧꒰ა ໒꒱ ‧₊˚	Swarovski Wing
