= Victoria's Secret Fashion Show 2012 =

American lingerie show

- Status: Active
- Genre: Fashion show
- Date: November 7, 2012
- Frequency: Annually
- Venue: 69th Regiment Armory
- Locations: New York City, United States
- Years active: 1995–2003, 2005–2018, 2024–present
- Inaugurated: August 1, 1995
- Most recent: 2026
- Previous event: 2011
- Next event: 2013
- Member: Victoria's Secret
- Website: Victoria's Secret Fashion Show

Victoria's Secret Angels 2012
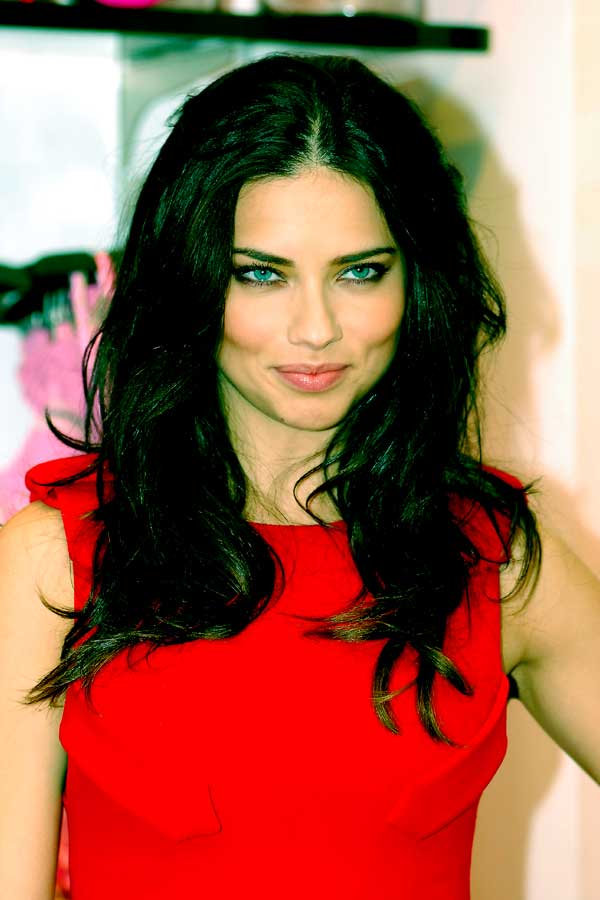
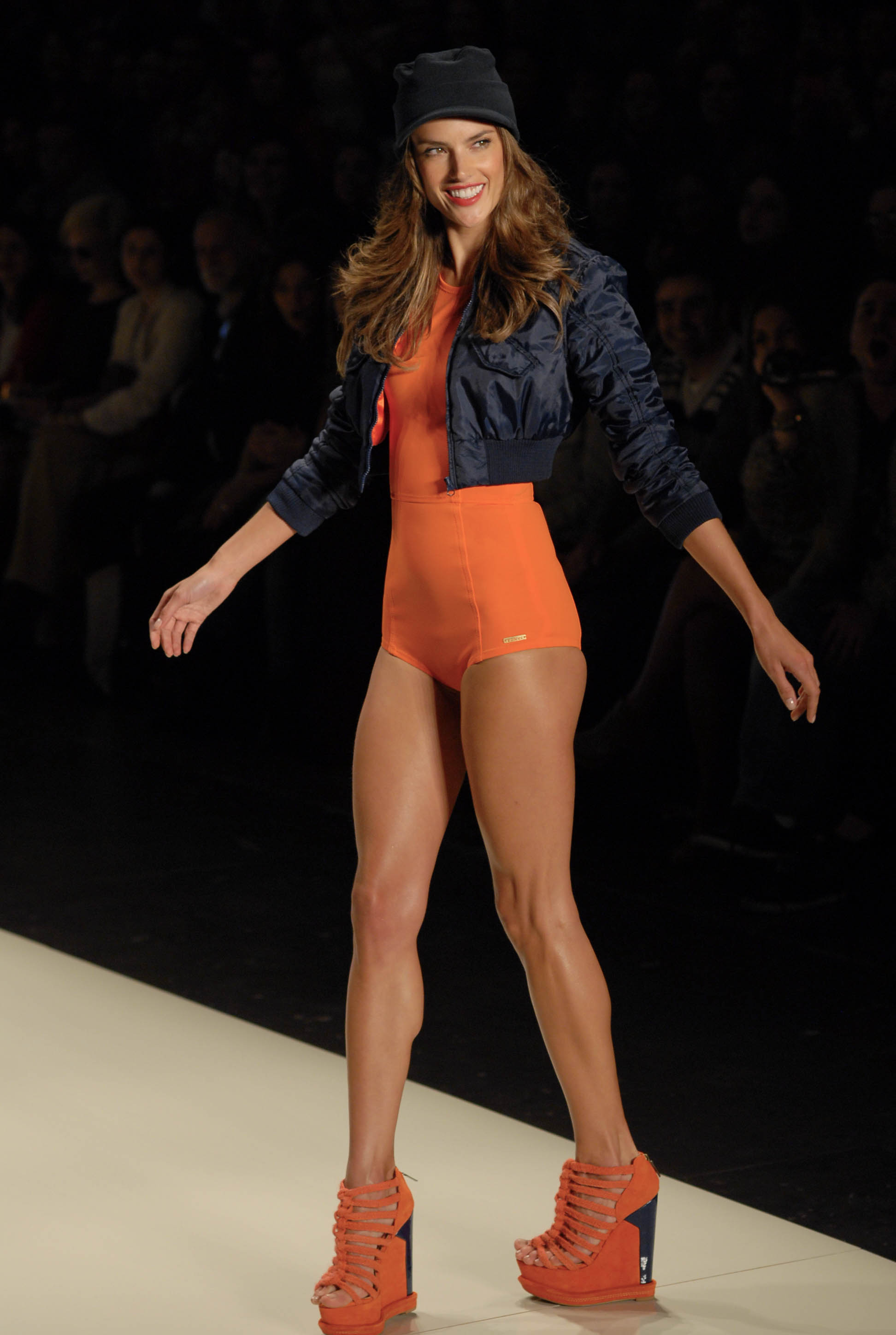
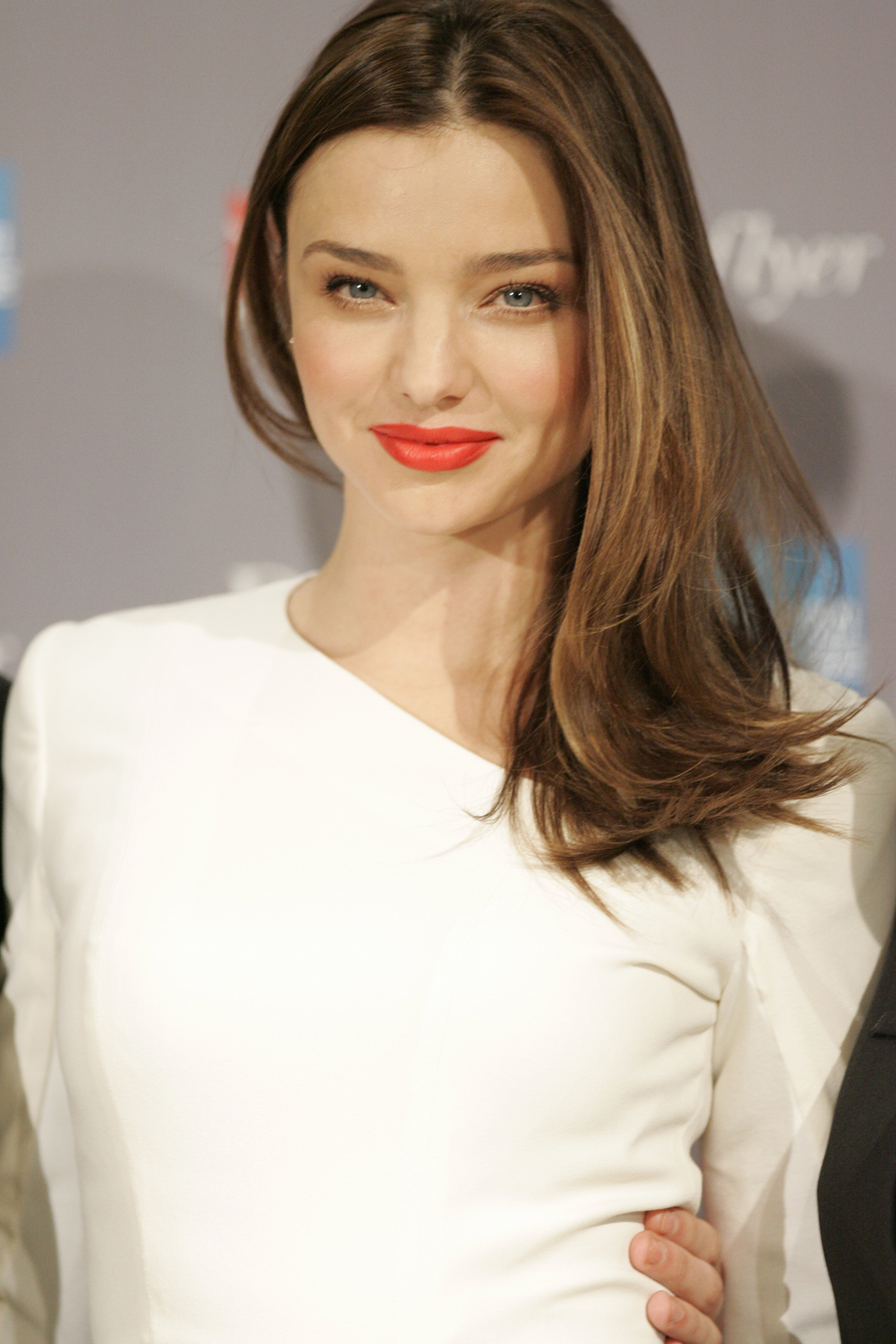
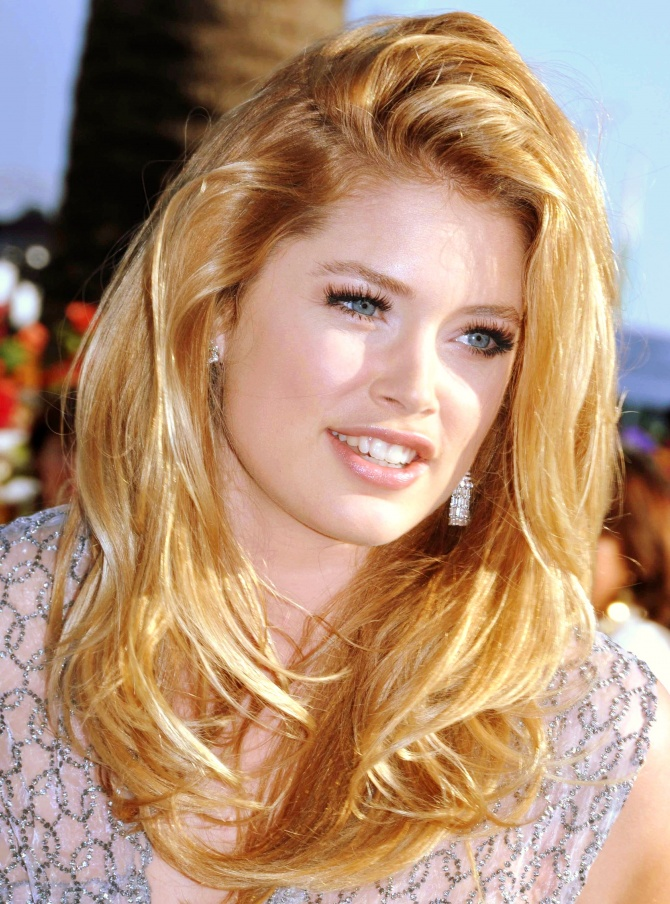
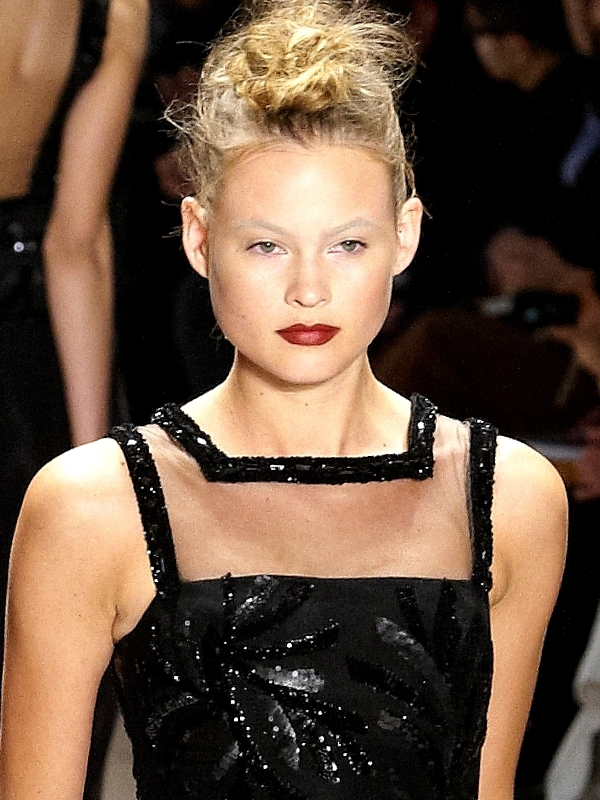
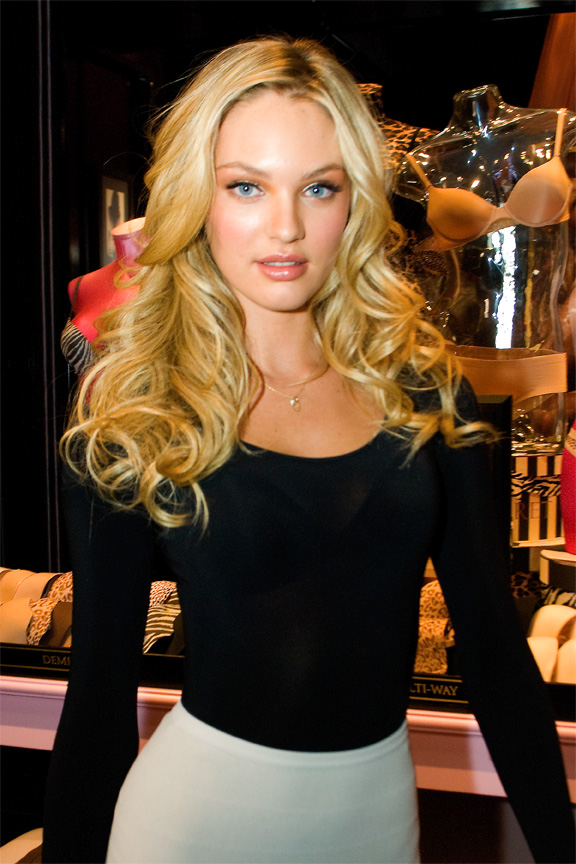
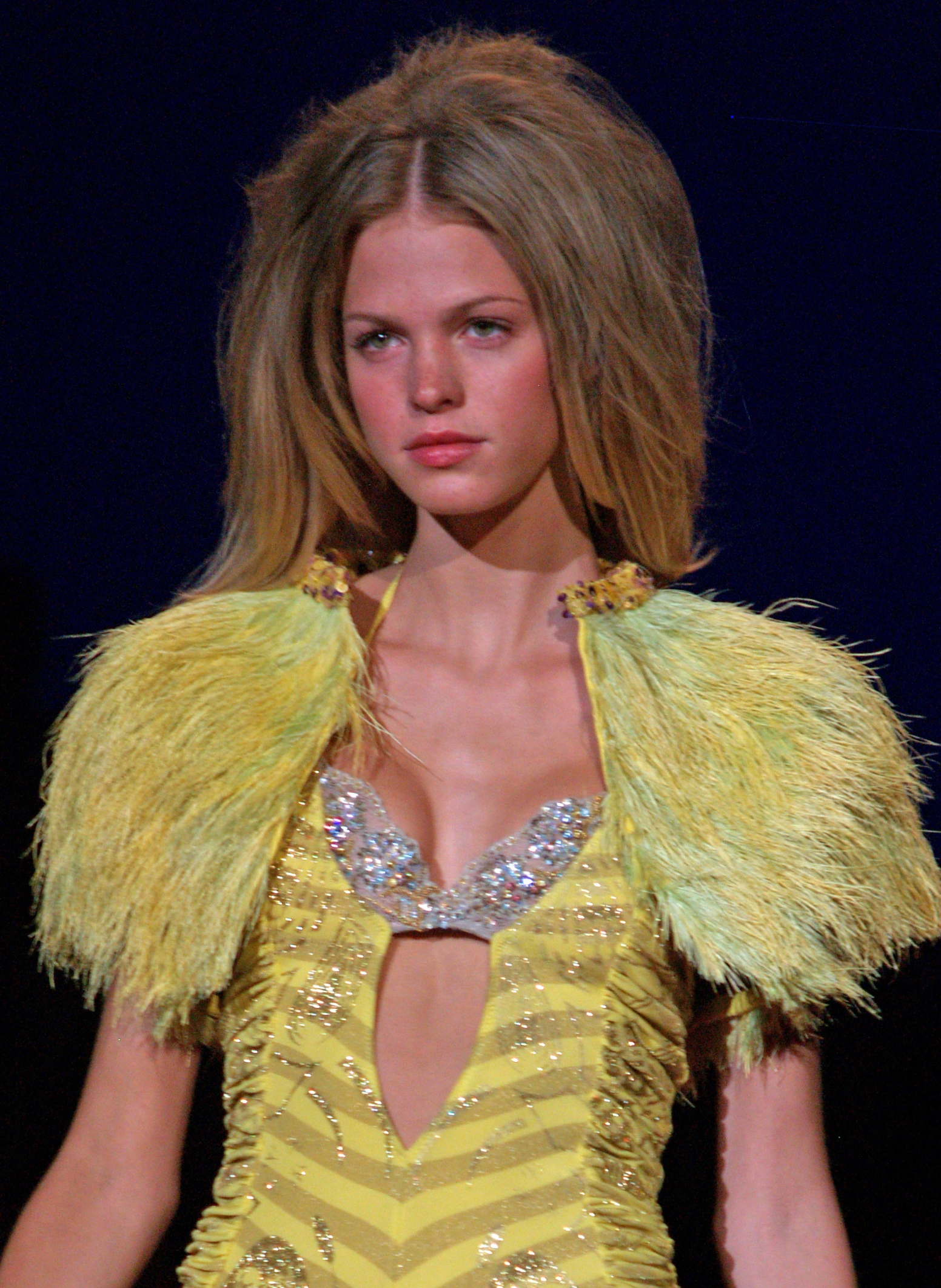
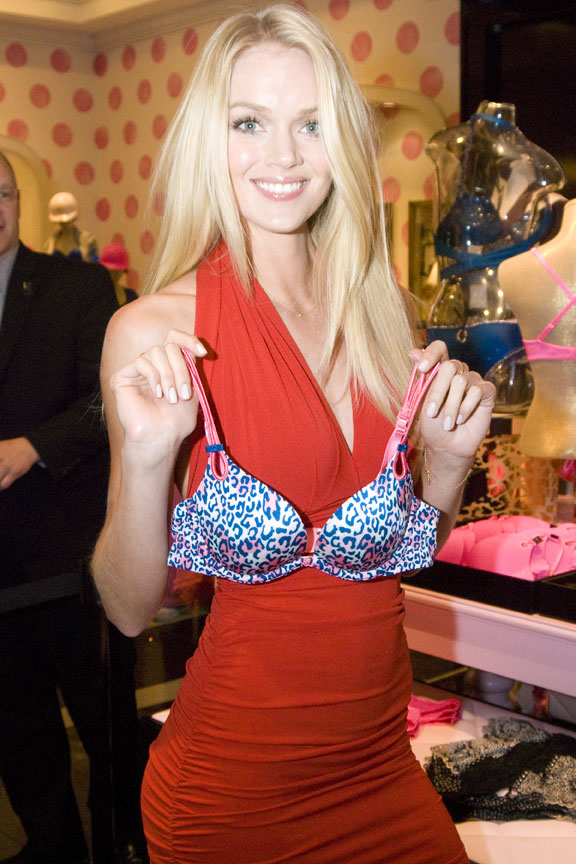
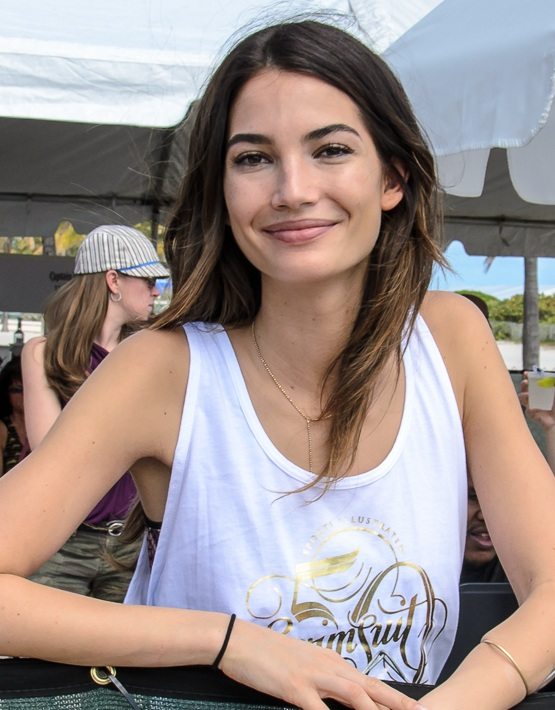
Victoria's Secrets 2012 Angels Campaign (left to right in each row) Adriana Lima, Alessandra Ambrosio, Miranda Kerr, Doutzen Kroes, Behati Prinsloo, Candice Swanepoel, Erin Heatherton, Lindsay Ellingson, and Lily Aldridge.

The Victoria's Secret Fashion Show is an annual fashion show sponsored by Victoria's Secret, an American premium brand of lingerie and sleepwear. Victoria's Secret uses the show to promote and market its goods in high-profile settings. The show features some of the world's leading fashion models, such as current Victoria's Secret Angels Adriana Lima, Alessandra Ambrosio, Behati Prinsloo, Candice Swanepoel, Miranda Kerr, Doutzen Kroes, Lily Aldridge, Lindsay Ellingson, and Erin Heatherton.

The show featured performances by Rihanna, Bruno Mars, and Justin Bieber.

Dates	Locations	Broadcaster	Viewers (millions)	Performers	Previous	Next
November 7, 2012 (recorded); December 4, 2012	New York City	CBS	9.48	Rihanna, Justin Bieber, and Bruno Mars	2011	2013

== Fashion show segments ==
=== Segment 1: Circus (Choreographed by Christopher Harrison) ===
Artist(s)	Song(s)	Status
(United States) The Doors	"Break On Through"	Remixed Recording
(United States) Dick Dale	"Misirlou"	Remixed Recording
(Australia) Pendulum	"Slam"	Remixed Recording
(United States) Missy Elliott	"Get Ur Freak On"	Remixed Recording
(United Kingdom) Billy Idol	"Rebel Yell"	Remixed Recording

Nationality	Model	Wings	Runway Shows	Status
(Brazil) Brazilian	Adriana Lima		1999–2003 • 2005–2008 • 2010–2018 • 2024–present	VS 2 Angel (2000–2018)
(South Africa) South African	Candice Swanepoel	꒰১ ໒꒱	2007–2015 • 2017–2018 • 2024–present	VS 4 Angel (2010–2021)
(United States) American	Karlie Kloss	꒰১ ໒꒱	2011–2014 • 2017	
(Netherlands) Dutch	Doutzen Kroes		2005–2006 • 2008–2009 • 2011–2014 • 2024–present	VS 3 Angel (2008–2014)
(Australia) Australian	Miranda Kerr		2006–2009 • 2011–2012	VS 3 Angel (2007–2013)
(Germany) German	Toni Garrn	꒰১ ໒꒱	2011–2013 • 2018	
(United States) American	Erin Heatherton	꒰১ ໒꒱	2008–2013	VS 4 Angel (2010–2013)
(Brazil) Brazilian	Izabel Goulart		2005–2016	Former VS 3 Angel (2005–2008)
(Brazil) Brazilian	Barbara Fialho		2012–2018	
(Brazil) Brazilian	Alessandra Ambrosio		2000–2003 • 2005–2017 • 2024–present	VS 2 Angel (2004–2017)
(China) Chinese	Liu Wen		2009–2012 • 2016–2018 • 2024–present	
(Puerto Rico) Puerto Rican	Joan Smalls	꒰১ ໒꒱	2011–2016 • 2024–present	

=== Segment 2: Dangerous Liaisons ===
Artist	Song	Status
(Barbados) Rihanna	"Diamonds"	Live Performance

Nationality	Model	Wings	Runway Shows	Status
(Namibia) Namibian	Behati Prinsloo	꒰১ ໒꒱	2007–2015 • 2018 • 2024–present	VS 3 Angel (2009–2019)
(United Kingdom) British	Lily Donaldson		2010–2016	
(France) French	Constance Jablonski	꒰১ ໒꒱	2010–2015	
(Australia) Australian	Miranda Kerr		2006–2009 • 2011–2012	VS 3 Angel (2007–2013)
(Australia) Australian	Shanina Shaik	꒰১ ໒꒱	2011–2012 • 2014–2015 • 2018	
(Poland) Polish	Magdalena Frackowiak		2010 • 2012–2015	
(Brazil) Brazilian	Isabeli Fontana	꒰১ ໒꒱	2003 • 2005 • 2007–2010 • 2012 • 2014 • 2024	
(Netherlands) Dutch	Bregje Heinen		2011–2012 • 2014	
(China) Chinese	Sui He		2011–2018	
(Netherlands) Dutch	Doutzen Kroes	꒰১ ໒꒱	2005–2006 • 2008–2009 • 2011–2014 • 2024–present	VS 3 Angel (2008–2014)

=== Segment 3: Calendar Girls ===
Artist	Song	Status
(United States) Bruno Mars	"Locked Out of Heaven"	Live Performance

Nationality	Model	Wings	Runway Shows	Status
(United States) American	Erin Heatherton	꒰১ ໒꒱	2008–2013	VS 4 Angel (2010–2013)
(South Africa) South African	Candice Swanepoel	꒰১ ໒꒱	2007–2015 • 2017–2018 • 2024–present	VS 4 Angel (2010–2021)
(United States) American	Hilary Rhoda	꒰১ ໒꒱	2012–2013	
(United States) American	Cameron Russell		2011–2012	
(Sweden) Swedish	Frida Gustavsson		2012	
(United States) American	Lindsay Ellingson	꒰১ ໒꒱	2007–2014	VS 4 Angel (2011–2014)
(United States) American	Lily Aldridge	꒰১ ໒꒱	2009–2017 • 2025	VS 4 Angel (2010–2018)
(Brazil) Brazilian	Barbara Fialho		2012–2018	
(Brazil) Brazilian	Izabel Goulart	꒰১ ໒꒱	2005–2016	Former VS 3 Angel (2005–2008)
(Namibia) Namibian	Behati Prinsloo		2007–2015 • 2018 • 2024–present	VS 3 Angel (2009–2019)
(United States) American	Karlie Kloss		2011–2014 • 2017	Outfit edited out of broadcast due to controversy
(Hungary) Hungarian	Barbara Palvin	꒰১ ໒꒱	2012 • 2018 • 2024–present	

=== Special Performance ===
Artist	Song	Status
(Canada) Justin Bieber	"As Long As You Love Me"	Live Performance

=== Segment 4: PINK Ball ===
Artist	Song	Status
(Canada) Justin Bieber	"Beauty and a Beat"	Live Performance

Nationality	Model	Wings	Runway Shows	Status
(Australia) Australian	Jessica Hart		2012–2013	PINK Angel (2011–2013)
(Latvia) Latvian	Ieva Lagūna		2011–2014	
(Sweden) Swedish	Elsa Hosk	꒰১ ໒꒱	2011–2018 • 2026	PINK Angel (2011–2014)
(Sweden) Swedish	Dorothea Barth Jörgensen		2009 • 2012	
(China) Chinese	Shu Pei		2012	
(United Kingdom) British	Cara Delevingne		2012–2013	
(Angola) Angolan	Sharam Diniz	꒰১ ໒꒱	2012 • 2015	
(United States) American	Jacquelyn Jablonski		2010–2015	
(Netherlands) Dutch	Maud Welzen		2012 • 2014–2015	
(United Kingdom) British	Jourdan Dunn		2012–2014	

=== Segment 5: Silver Screen Angels ===
Artist	Song	Status
(United States) Bruno Mars	"Young Girls"	Live Performance

Nationality	Model	Wings	Runway Shows	Status	Swarovski Outfit	Value
(United States) American	Lindsay Ellingson	꒰১ ໒꒱	2007–2014	VS 4 Angel (2011–2014)		
(China) Chinese	Sui He		2011–2018			
(Netherlands) Dutch	Doutzen Kroes		2005–2006 • 2008–2009 • 2011–2014 • 2024–present	VS 3 Angel (2008–2014)		
(United States) American	Hilary Rhoda		2012–2013	✿		
(Netherlands) Dutch	Bregje Heinen		2011–2012 • 2014			
(United States) American	Cameron Russell	꒰১ ໒꒱	2011–2012		10th Anniversary Swarovski Outfit	–
(Puerto Rico) Puerto Rican	Joan Smalls		2011–2016 • 2024–present			
(Poland) Polish	Magdalena Frackowiak	꒰১ ໒꒱	2010 • 2012–2015			
(United Kingdom) British	Lily Donaldson		2010–2016			
(Australia) Australian	Miranda Kerr	꒰১ ໒꒱	2006–2009 • 2011–2012	VS 3 Angel (2007–2013)		

=== Segment 6: Angels In Bloom ===
Artist	Song	Status
(Barbados) Rihanna	"Phresh Out The Runway"	Live Performance

Nationality	Model	Wings	Runway Shows	Status	Fantasy Bra	Price
(South Africa) South African	Candice Swanepoel	꒰১ ໒꒱	2007–2015 • 2017–2018 • 2024–present	VS 4 Angel (2010–2021)		
(Australia) Australian	Shanina Shaik		2011–2012 • 2014–2015 • 2018			
(Brazil) Brazilian	Alessandra Ambrosio	꒰১ ໒꒱	2000–2003 • 2005–2017 • 2024–present	VS 2 Angel (2004–2017)	Floral Fantasy Bra & Gift Set by London Jewelers	$2,500,000
(United States) American	Jasmine Tookes		2012–2018 • 2024–present			
(Brazil) Brazilian	Isabeli Fontana		2003 • 2005 • 2007–2010 • 2012 • 2014 • 2024			
(Brazil) Brazilian	Adriana Lima		1999–2003 • 2005–2008 • 2010–2018 • 2024–present	VS 2 Angel (2000–2018)		
(United States) American	Lily Aldridge	꒰১ ໒꒱	2009–2017 • 2025	VS 4 Angel (2010–2018)		
(United States) American	Karlie Kloss	˚₊‧꒰ა ໒꒱ ‧₊˚	2011–2014 • 2017			
(Namibia) Namibian	Behati Prinsloo	꒰১ ໒꒱	2007–2015 • 2018 • 2024–present	VS 3 Angel (2009–2019)		
(France) French	Constance Jablonski		2010–2015			
(Germany) German	Toni Garrn	꒰১ ໒꒱	2011–2013 • 2018			

== Finale ==
Artist(s)	Song	Status
(United Kingdom) Rudimental • (United Kingdom) John Newman	"Feel the Love"	Remixed Recording

Model	Runway Shows	Status	Model	Runway Shows	Status
(Brazil) Adriana Lima	1999–2003 • 2005–2008 • 2010–2018 • 2024–present	VS 2 Angel (2000–2018)	(South Africa) Candice Swanepoel	2007–2015 • 2017–2018 • 2024–present	VS 4 Angel (2010–2021)
(Netherlands) Doutzen Kroes	2005–2006 • 2008–2009 • 2011–2014 • 2024–present	VS 3 Angel (2008–2014)	(United States) Erin Heatherton	2009–2013	VS 4 Angel (2010–2013)
(Australia) Miranda Kerr	2006–2009 • 2011–2012	VS 3 Angel (2007–2013)	(Brazil) Alessandra Ambrosio	2000–2003 • 2005–2017 • 2024–present	VS 2 Angel (2004–2017)
(United States) Lindsay Ellingson	2007–2014	VS 4 Angel (2011–2014)	(Namibia) Behati Prinsloo	2007–2015 • 2018 • 2024–present	VS 3 Angel (2009–2019)
(Brazil) Izabel Goulart	2005–2016	Former VS 3 Angel (2005–2008)	(United States) Lily Aldridge	2009–2017 • 2025	VS 4 Angel (2010–2018)
(United States) Karlie Kloss	2011–2014 • 2017		(Brazil) Isabeli Fontana	2003 • 2005 • 2007–2010 • 2012 • 2014 • 2024	
(France) Constance Jablonski	2010–2015		(Poland) Magdalena Frackowiak	2010 • 2012–2015	
(Sweden) Elsa Hosk	2011–2018 • 2026	PINK Angel (2011–2014)	(United Kingdom) Lily Donaldson	2010–2016	
(Australia) Jessica Hart	2012–2013	PINK Angel (2011–2013)	(Puerto Rico) Joan Smalls	2011–2016 • 2024–present	
(Australia) Shanina Shaik	2011–2012 • 2014–2015 • 2018		(United Kingdom) Cara Delevingne	2012–2013	
(United States) Jasmine Tookes	2012–2018 • 2024–present	✿	(United States) Jacquelyn Jablonski	2010–2015	
(Brazil) Barbara Fialho	2012–2018	✿	(United Kingdom) Jourdan Dunn	2012–2014	
(United States) Hilary Rhoda	2012–2013	✿	(Latvia) Ieva Laguna	2011–2014	
(Angola) Sharam Diniz	2012 • 2015	✿	(Netherlands) Bregje Heinen	2011–2012 • 2014	
(Sweden) Frida Gustavsson	2012	✿	(Sweden) Dorothea Barth Jorgensen	2009 • 2012	
(Netherlands) Maud Welzen	2012 • 2014–2015	✿	(United States) Cameron Russell	2011–2012	
(China) Shu Pei	2012	✿	(Hungary) Barbara Palvin	2012 • 2018 • 2024–present	
(China) Liu Wen	2009–2012 • 2016–2018 • 2024–present		(Germany) Toni Garrn	2011–2013 • 2018	
(China) Sui He	2011–2018				

== Index ==
Symbol	Meaning
VS 2	2nd Generation Angels
VS 3	3rd Generation Angels
VS 4	4th Generation Angels
PINK	PINK Angels
★	Star Billing
꒰১ ໒꒱	Wings
˚₊‧꒰ა ໒꒱ ‧₊˚	Swarovski Wing
