= Victoria's Secret Fashion Show 2011 =

Fashion show in New York City, US

- Status: Active
- Genre: Fashion show
- Date: November 9, 2011
- Frequency: Annually
- Venue: 69th Regiment Armory
- Locations: New York City, United States
- Years active: 1995–2003, 2005–2018, 2024–present
- Inaugurated: August 1, 1995
- Most recent: 2026
- Previous event: 2010
- Next event: 2012
- Member: Victoria's Secret
- Website: Victoria's Secret Fashion Show

Victoria's Secret Angels 2011
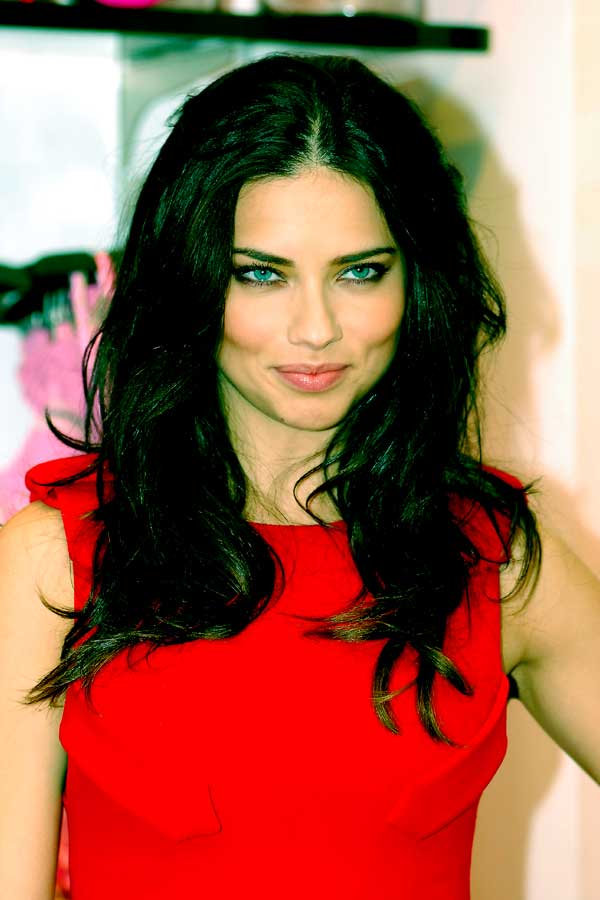
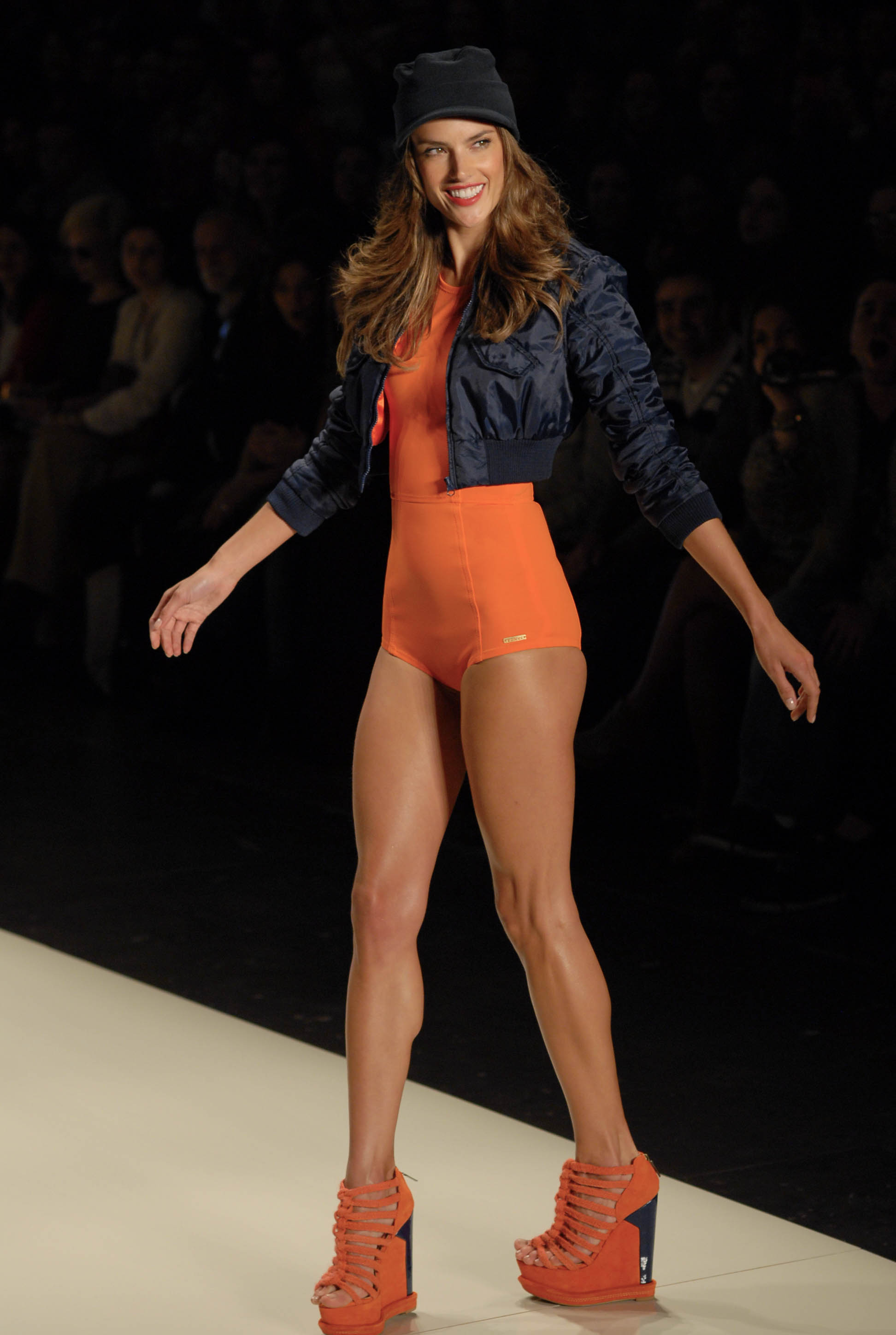
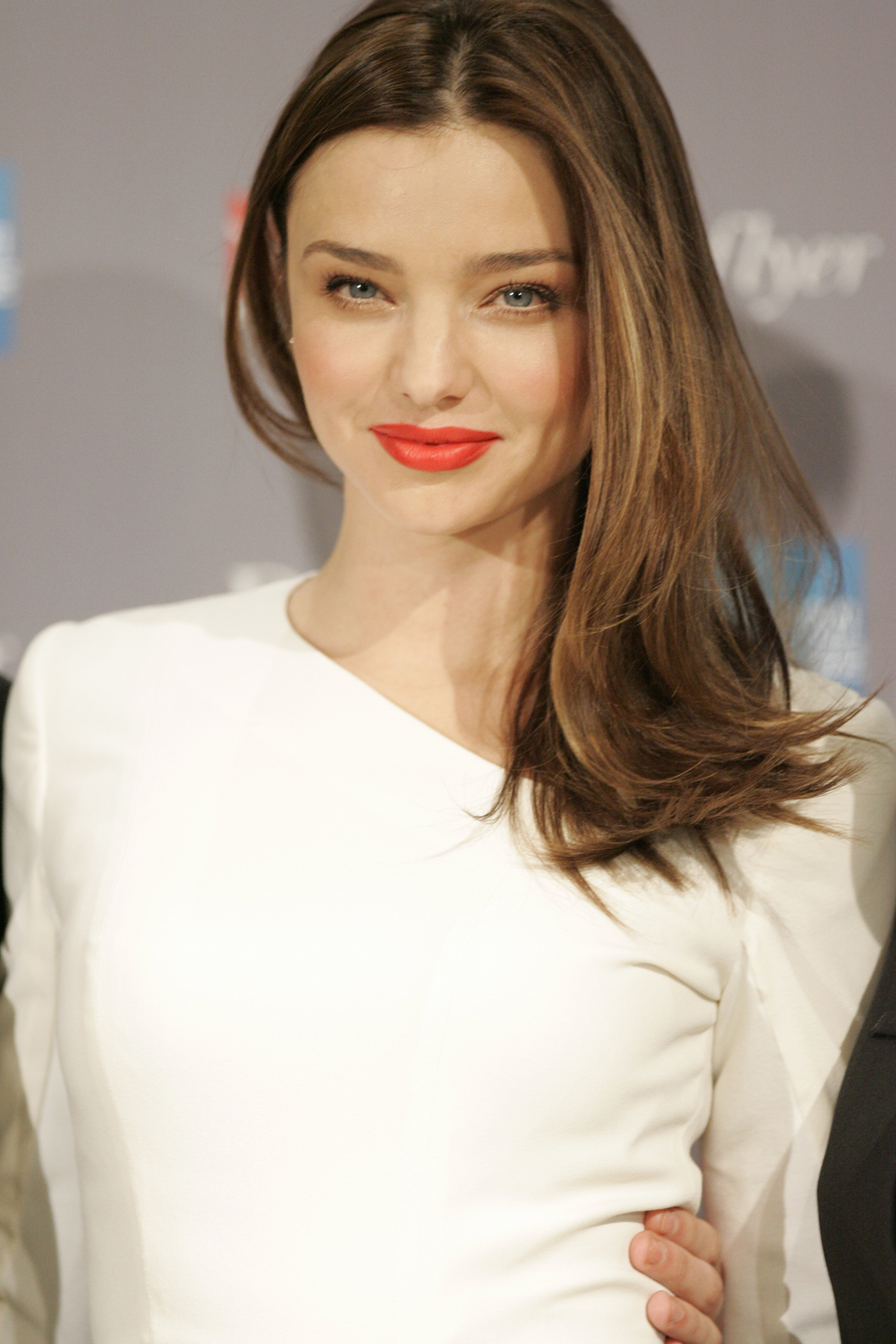
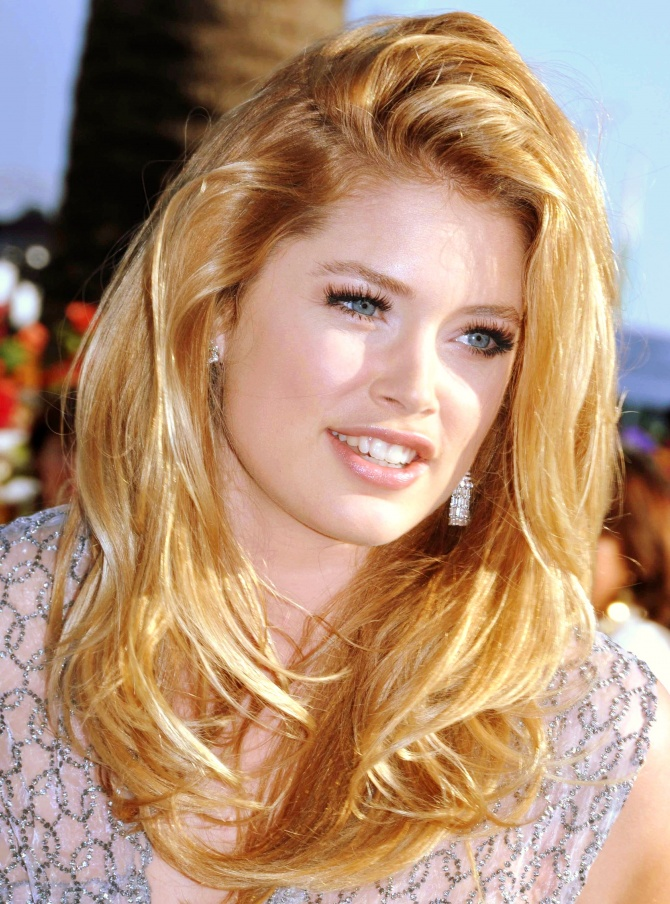
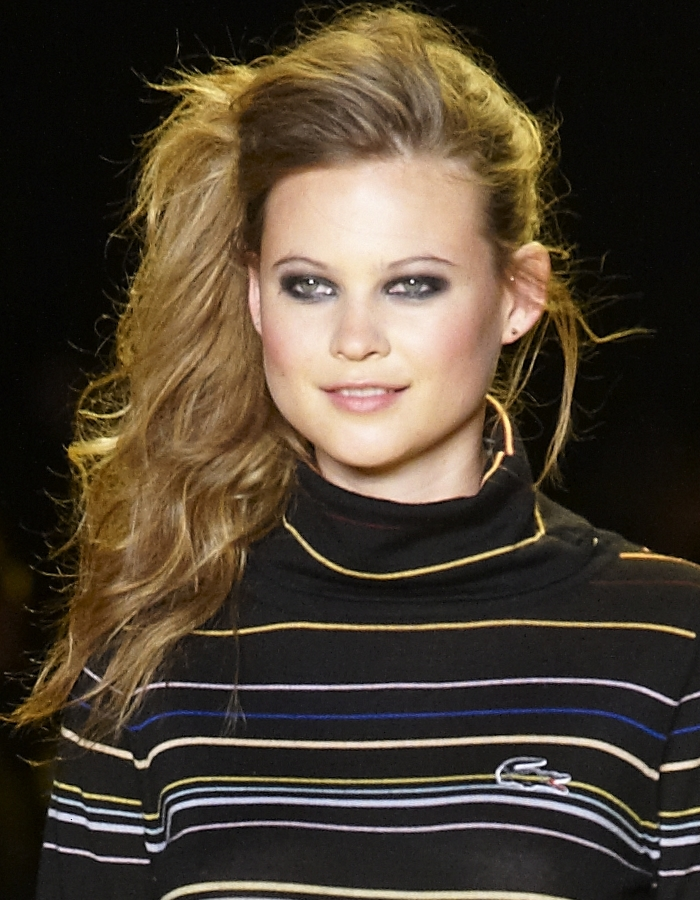
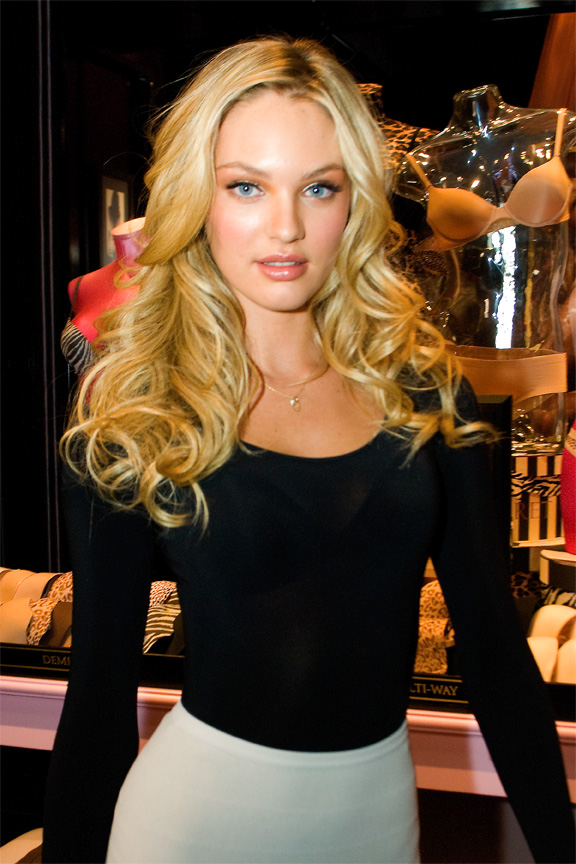
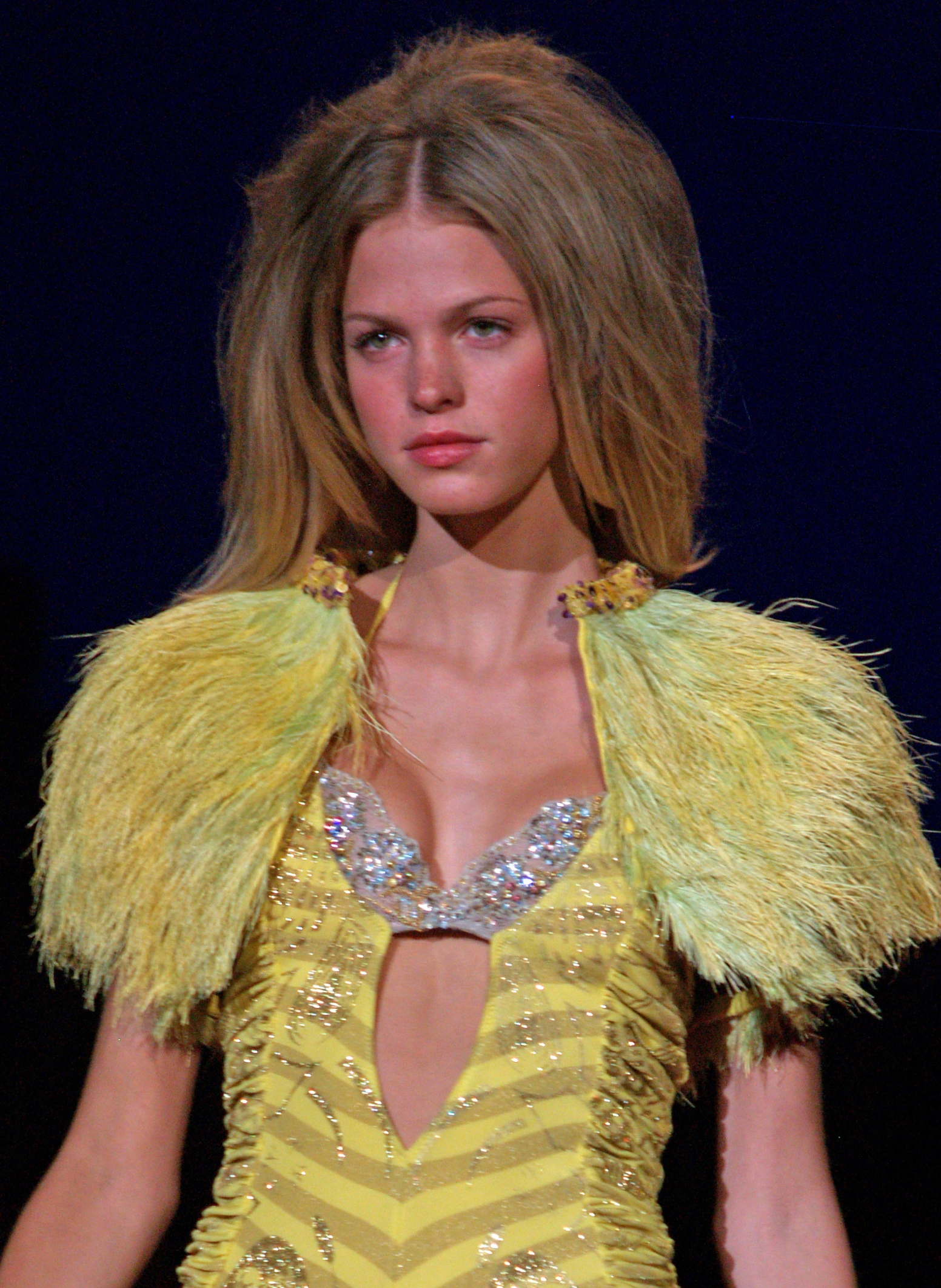
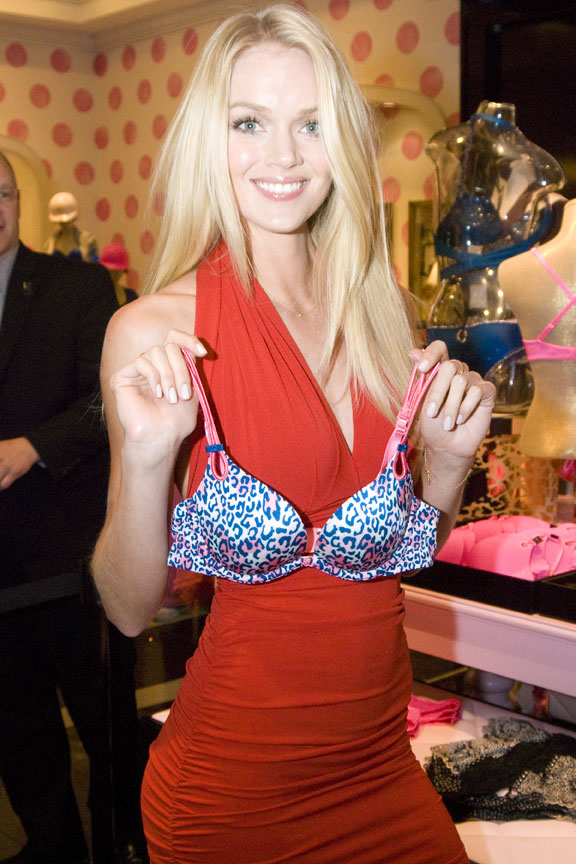
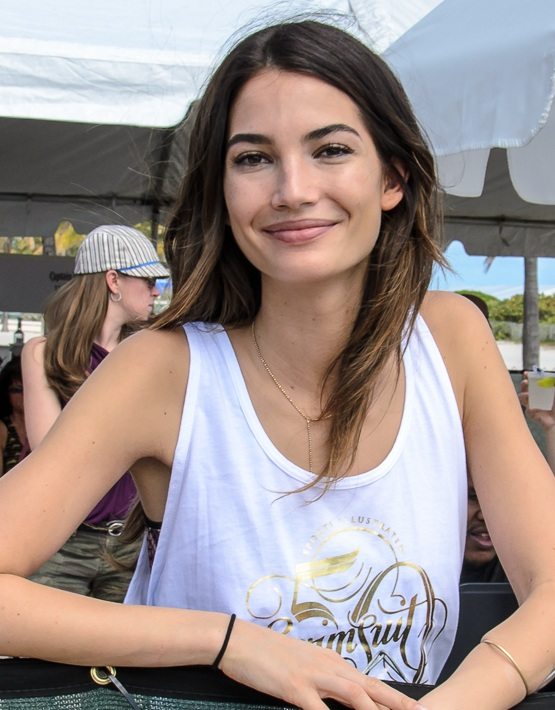
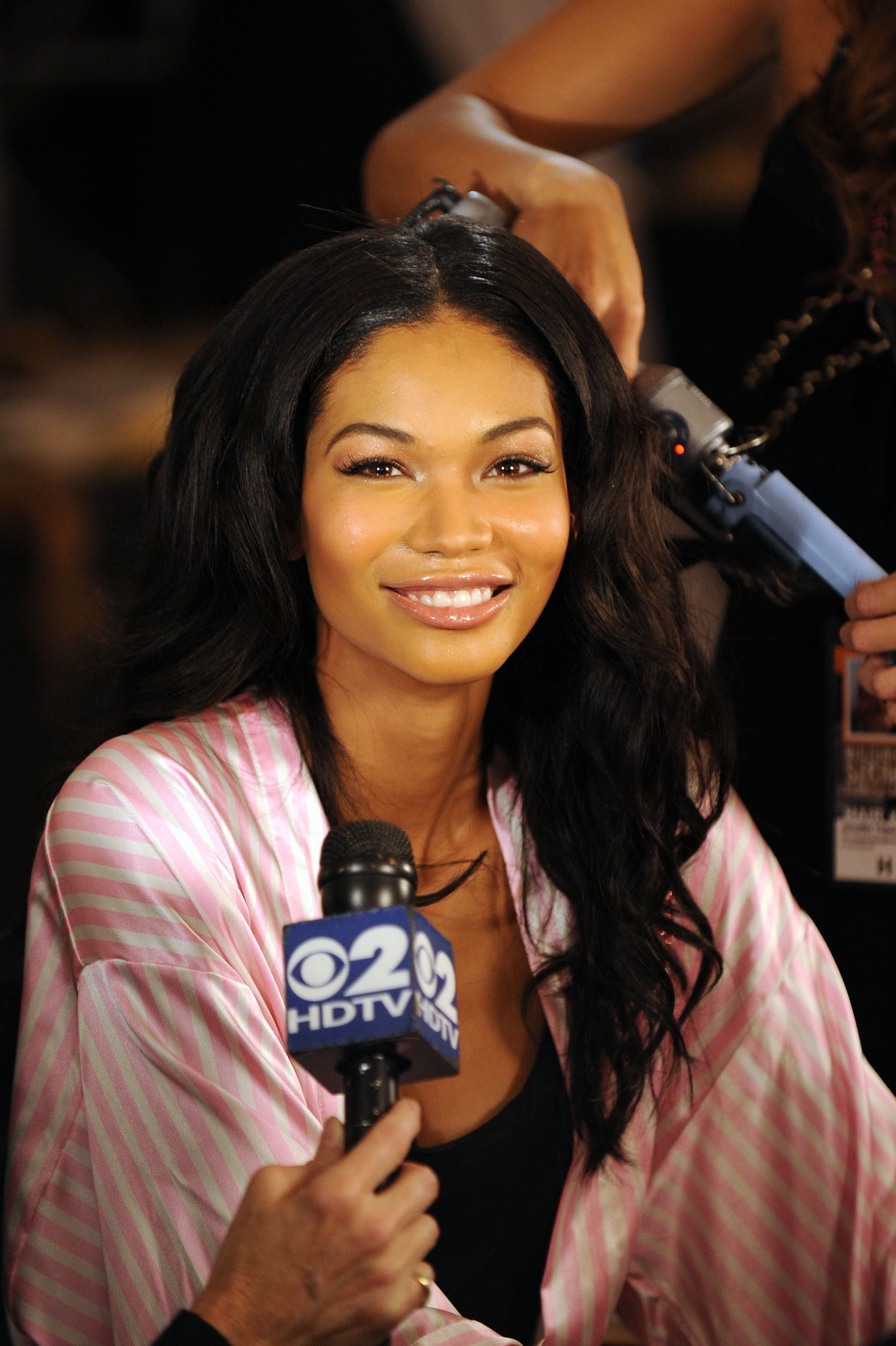
Victoria's Secrets 2011 Angels Campaign (left to right in each row) Adriana Lima, Alessandra Ambrosio, Miranda Kerr, Doutzen Kroes, Behati Prinsloo, Candice Swanepoel, Erin Heatherton, Lindsay Ellingson, Lily Aldridge, and Chanel Iman.

The Victoria's Secret Fashion Show is an annual fashion show sponsored by Victoria's Secret, a brand of lingerie and sleepwear. Victoria's Secret uses the show to promote and market its goods in high-profile settings. The show features some of the world's leading fashion models, such as current Victoria's Secret Angels Adriana Lima, Alessandra Ambrosio, Behati Prinsloo, Candice Swanepoel, Miranda Kerr, Doutzen Kroes, Lily Aldridge, Lindsay Ellingson, Erin Heatherton, and Chanel Iman. Lais Ribeiro also received billing.

The 16th fashion show featured some the new Angels (Karlie Kloss being the only newcomer to walk three times since 2006) and also the returning Angels. There were special performances by Kanye West, Maroon 5, Jay-Z, and Nicki Minaj.

Dates	Locations	Broadcaster	Viewers (millions)	Performers	Previous	Next
November 9, 2011 (recorded); November 29, 2011	New York City	CBS	10.30	Kanye West, Maroon 5, Jay-Z, and Nicki Minaj	2010	2012

== Fashion show segments ==
=== Segment 1: Ballet ===
Artist(s)	Song(s)	Status
(United Kingdom) Leona Lewis	"Brave"	Remixed Recording
(United States) The Pretty Reckless	"Make Me Wanna Die"	Remixed Recording

Nationality	Model	Wings	Runway Shows	Status
(South Africa) South African	Candice Swanepoel	꒰১ ໒꒱	2007–2015 • 2017–2018 • 2024–present	VS 4 Angel (2010–2021)
(Poland) Polish	Anja Rubik	꒰১ ໒꒱	2009–2011	
(United States) American	Lily Aldridge	꒰১ ໒꒱	2009–2017 • 2025	VS 4 Angel (2010–2018)
(Brazil) Brazilian	Alessandra Ambrosio		2000–2003 • 2005–2017 • 2024–present	VS 2 Angel (2004–2017)
(United States) American	Chanel Iman		2009–2011	VS 4 Angel (2010–2012)
(Netherlands) Dutch	Doutzen Kroes	꒰১ ໒꒱	2005–2006 • 2008–2009 • 2011–2014 • 2024–present	VS 3 Angel (2008–2014)
(Germany) German	Toni Garrn	꒰১ ໒꒱	2011–2013 • 2018	
(China) Chinese	Sui He		2011–2018	
(Brazil) Brazilian	Lais Ribeiro		2010–2011 • 2013–2018	★
(Netherlands) Dutch	Bregje Heinen		2011–2012 • 2014	
(Australia) Australian	Miranda Kerr		2006–2009 • 2011–2012	VS 3 Angel (2007–2013)

=== Segment 2: Super Angels ===
Performer	Song	Status
(United States) Kanye West	"Stronger"	Live Performance

Nationality	Model	Wings	Runway Shows	Status
(Brazil) Brazilian	Adriana Lima		1999–2003 • 2005–2008 • 2010–2018 • 2024–present	VS 2 Angel (2000–2018)
(United States) American	Lindsay Ellingson	꒰১ ໒꒱	2007–2014	New VS 4 Angel (2011–2014)
(United States) American	Shannan Click		2008–2011	
(Brazil) Brazilian	Izabel Goulart	꒰১ ໒꒱	2005–2016	Former VS 3 Angel (2005–2008)
(United States) American	Karlie Kloss		2011–2014 • 2017	
(Puerto Rico) Puerto Rican	Joan Smalls	꒰১ ໒꒱	2011–2016 • 2024–present	
(Estonia) Estonian	Karmen Pedaru	꒰১ ໒꒱	2011	
(Namibia) Namibian	Behati Prinsloo	꒰১ ໒꒱	2007–2015 • 2018 • 2024–present	VS 3 (2009–2019) PINK (2008–2011) Angel
(Poland) Polish	Anja Rubik		2009–2011	
(United States) American	Erin Heatherton	꒰১ ໒꒱	2008–2013	VS 4 Angel (2010–2013)

=== Special Performance ===
Performer	Song	Status
(United States) Jay-Z • (United States) Kanye West	"Homies In Paris"	Live Performance

=== Segment 3: Passion ===
Performer	Song	Status
(Barbados) Rihanna	"California King Bed"	Recording

Nationality	Model	Wings	Runway Shows	Status	Swarovski Outfit	Price
(Brazil) Brazilian	Alessandra Ambrosio	˚₊‧꒰ა ໒꒱ ‧₊˚	2000–2003 • 2005–2017 • 2024–present	VS 2 Angel (2004–2017)	The First Swarovski Outfit	–
(South Africa) South African	Candice Swanepoel		2007–2015 • 2017–2018 • 2024–present	VS 4 Angel (2010–2021)		
(Belarus) Belarusian	Maryna Linchuk		2008–2011 • 2013			
(United Kingdom) British	Lily Donaldson		2010–2016			
(Netherlands) Dutch	Doutzen Kroes	꒰১ ໒꒱	2005–2006 • 2008–2009 • 2011–2014 • 2024–present	VS 3 Angel (2008–2014)		
(Germany) German	Julia Stegner		2005–2011			
(Netherlands) Dutch	Bregje Heinen		2011–2012 • 2014			
(Brazil) Brazilian	Lais Ribeiro	꒰১ ໒꒱	2010–2011 • 2013–2018	★		
(Brazil) Brazilian	Flavia de Oliveira	꒰১ ໒꒱	2006–2008 • 2010–2011			
(Brazil) Brazilian	Adriana Lima		1999–2003 • 2005–2008 • 2010–2018 • 2024–present	VS 2 Angel (2000–2018)		

=== Segment 4: Aquatic Angels ===
Performer	Song	Status
(United States) Maroon 5	"Moves Like Jagger"	Live Performance

Nationality	Model	Wings	Runway Shows	Status	Fantasy Bra	Price
(Australia) Australian	Miranda Kerr	꒰১ ໒꒱	2006–2009 • 2011–2012	VS 3 Angel (2007–2013)	Fantasy Treasure Bra by London Jewelers	$2,500,000
(China) Chinese	Sui He		2011–2018			
(France) French	Constance Jablonski		2010–2015			
(Sweden) Swedish	Caroline Winberg		2005–2011			
(United States) American	Lindsay Ellingson	꒰১ ໒꒱	2007–2014	New VS 4 Angel (2011–2014)		
(Russia) Russian	Anne Vyalitsyna		2008 • 2010–2011			
(China) Chinese	Liu Wen		2009–2012 • 2016–2018 • 2024–present			
(France) French	Anais Mali		2011			
(United States) American	Erin Heatherton	꒰১ ໒꒱	2008–2013	VS 4 Angel (2010–2013)		
(Puerto Rico) Puerto Rican	Joan Smalls	꒰১ ໒꒱	2011–2016 • 2024–present			
(Belarus) Belarusian	Maryna Linchuk	꒰১ ໒꒱	2008–2011 • 2013			
(United States) American	Karlie Kloss	꒰১ ໒꒱	2011–2014 • 2017			

=== Segment 5: I Put a Spell On You ===
Performer	Song	Status
(United States) OneRepublic	Secrets	Recording

Nationality	Model	Wings	Runway Shows	Status
(Netherlands) Dutch	Doutzen Kroes		2005–2006 • 2008–2009 • 2011–2014 • 2024–present	VS 3 Angel (2008–2014)
(Brazil) Brazilian	Alessandra Ambrosio		2000–2003 • 2005–2017 • 2024–present	VS 2 Angel (2004–2017)
(Estonia) Estonian	Karmen Pedaru		2011	
(United Kingdom) British	Lily Donaldson	꒰১ ໒꒱	2010–2016	
(Brazil) Brazilian	Izabel Goulart	꒰১ ໒꒱	2005–2016	Former VS 3 Angel (2005–2008)
(Germany) German	Toni Garrn		2011–2013 • 2018	
(Brazil) Brazilian	Emanuela de Paula	꒰১ ໒꒱	2008 • 2010–2011	
(United States) American	Cameron Russell	꒰১ ໒꒱	2011–2012	
(South Africa) South African	Candice Swanepoel	꒰১ ໒꒱	2007–2015 • 2017–2018 • 2024–present	VS 4 Angel (2010–2021)
(Australia) Australian	Shanina Shaik		2011–2012 • 2014–2015 • 2018	
(Poland) Polish	Anja Rubik		2009–2011	
(Brazil) Brazilian	Adriana Lima	꒰১ ໒꒱	1999–2003 • 2005–2008 • 2010–2018 • 2024–present	VS 2 Angel (2000–2018)
(Australia) Australian	Miranda Kerr		2006–2009 • 2011–2012	VS 3 Angel (2007–2013)

=== Segment 6: Club Pink ===
Performer	Song	Status
(Trinidad and Tobago) Nicki Minaj	"Super Bass"	Live Performance
(United States) Lyn Collins	"Think (About It)"	Sampling (bridge for Nicki Minaj)

Nationality	Model	Wings	Runway Shows	Status
(United States) American	Erin Heatherton		2008–2013	VS 4 Angel (2010–2013)
(Latvia) Latvian	Ieva Lagūna		2011–2014	
(Namibia) Namibian	Behati Prinsloo	꒰১ ໒꒱	2007–2015 • 2018 • 2024–present	VS 3 (2009–2019) PINK (2008–2011) Angel
(Brazil) Brazilian	Lais Ribeiro		2010–2011 • 2013–2018	
(United States) American	Shannan Click	꒰১ ໒꒱	2008–2011	
(New Zealand) New Zealander	Jessica Clarke		2011	
(Denmark) Danish	Caroline Brasch Nielsen		2011 • 2013	
(United States) American	Chanel Iman	꒰১ ໒꒱	2009–2011	VS 4 Angel (2010–2012)
(Sweden) Swedish	Elsa Hosk		2011–2018 • 2026	PINK Angel (2011–2014)
(United States) American	Jacquelyn Jablonski		2010–2015	
(United States) American	Lily Aldridge		2009–2017 • 2025	VS 4 Angel (2010–2018)
(United States) American	Lindsay Ellingson		2007–2014	VS 4 Angel (2011–2014)
(United States) American	Karlie Kloss	꒰১ ໒꒱	2011–2014 • 2017	

== Finale ==
Performer	Song	Status
Lady Gaga	Born This Way	Mixed Recording
Rihanna	S&M	Mixed Recording
Beyonce	Run The World (Girls)	Mixed Recording

== Index ==
Symbol	Meaning
VS 2	2nd Generation Angels
VS 3	3rd Generation Angels
VS 4	4th Generation Angels
PINK	PINK Angels
★	Star Billing
꒰১ ໒꒱	Wings
˚₊‧꒰ა ໒꒱ ‧₊˚	Swarovski Wing
