= Sui He =

Chinese model and actress (born 1989)

Sui He (He Sui)
- 何穗
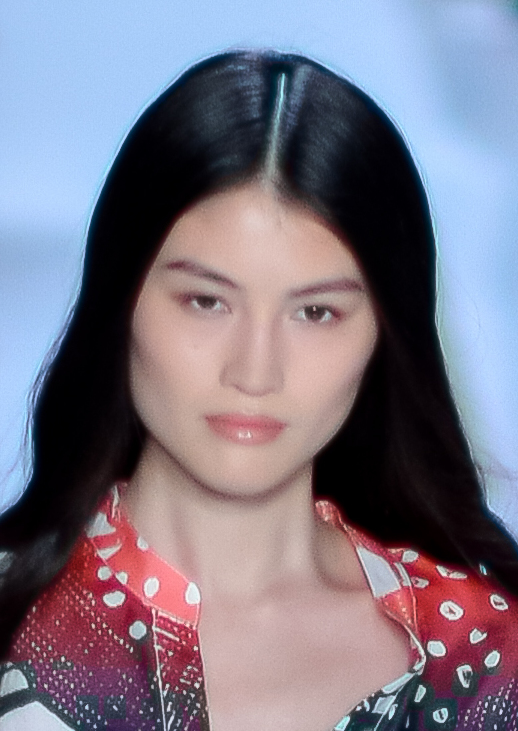
- Sui He in 2013
- Born: September 23, 1989 (age 37); Wenzhou, Zhejiang
- Partner: William Chan
- Children: 1
- Modeling information
- Height: 1.77 m (5 ft 9 1/2 in)
- Hair color: Black
- Eye color: Brown
- Agency: New York Model Management (New York); Ford Models (Paris); Fashion Model Management (Milan); Storm Model Management (London); View Management (Barcelona); Gossip Model Management (Copenhagen); LA Model Management (Los Angeles); Focus Management (Shanghai)

Sui He (Chinese: 何穗; pinyin: Hé Suì, born September 23, 1989) is a Chinese model and actress. She was the first East Asian model to open a Ralph Lauren runway show and the second Chinese model to walk in the Victoria's Secret Fashion Show. Sui He also appeared on the cover of W magazine as a relative unknown.

== Personal life ==
She was born as Sui He on September 23, 1989, in Wenzhou, Zhejiang, China. She was a member of her city's swim team for seven years.

On 18 October 2025, He Sui announced the birth of her first child, a son, with actor William Chan.

== Career ==
At the age of 17, while a junior in high school, Sui He entered a Chinese modeling contest and won. After winning the contest, she signed with China's Bentley Culture Development Co. in Beijing.

As of 2013, Sui He is ranked #13 on the Top 50 Models Women List by models.com. She was on Models.com's 2011 Top Women List as well.

Sui He made her runway debut at the Love, Sex, and Money runway show in the Spring/Summer 2011 runway season. Her breakthrough season was Fall/Winter 2011, where she most notably opened for Ralph Lauren and opened and closed Vivienne Tam in New York, walked for Dolce & Gabbana in Milan and walked exclusively for Shiatzy Chen and Dries van Noten in Paris. Due to her success that season, she was named one of New York Magazine's Fall 2011 Top 10 Faces and also was style.com's top ten newcomers. Other ready-to-wear show appearances include Chanel, Dior, Helmut Lang, Hermes, Hervé Léger, Jean Paul Gaultier, Missoni, Mugler, Oscar de la Renta, Ralph Lauren, and Y-3. Notable couture shows include Chanel, Dior, and Jean-Paul Gaultier.

Sui He walked in the 2011, 2012, 2013, 2014, 2015, 2016, 2017 and 2018, becoming the second model of East Asian heritage after Liu Wen to walk for Victoria's Secret.

Sui He appeared on the cover of W magazine's art issue in October 2011 as a relative unknown, becoming the first relatively unknown model to appear on a W cover in recent memory. She also appeared on the 6th anniversary cover of Vogue China along with other top Chinese models. Other covers include i-D and V.

In 2012, Sui He was selected to be the first Asian global spokesmodel for Shiseido. The print campaign was photographed by Nick Knight.

He's first campaign was Brunello Cucinelli Spring/Summer 2011. Her first major campaign was Ralph Lauren in Fall/Winter 2011. Most recently, Sui He appeared in the Printemps with Dior Holiday 2012 campaign along with Carolyn Murphy which was styled by Carine Roitfeld and photographed by Mario Testino. In addition, she appeared in Karl by Karl Lagerfeld campaigns in Fall/Winter 2012 and Spring 2012. Sui He has also appeared in two H&M campaigns, and an H&M Holiday 2011 television commercial.

She was part of the cast of the 2015 film You Are My Sunshine.

== Filmography ==
=== Films & Programs ===
- Keep Running S4E4 (2020)
- Pegasus (2019)
- Legend of the Naga Pearls (2017)
- Running Man China S4E2 (2016)
- Running Man China S3E11 (2016)
- You Are My Sunshine (2015)
- Temporary Family (2014)
