= Izabel Goulart =

Brazilian model (born 1984)

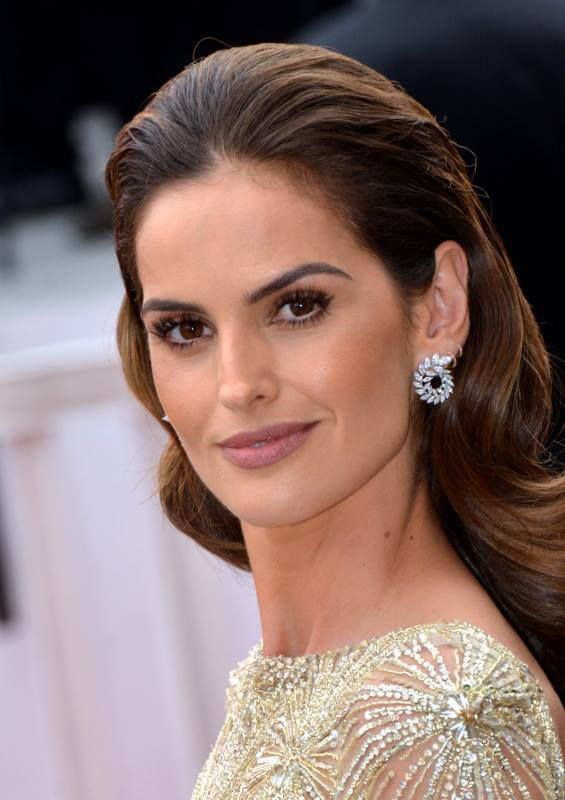
- Goulart in 2017
- Born: Maria Izabel Goulart Dourado; 23 October 1984 (age 41); São Carlos, São Paulo, Brazil
- Occupation: Model
- Modeling information
- Height: 5 ft 10 1/2 in (1.79 m)
- Hair color: Light Brown
- Eye color: Brown
- Agency: Elite Model Management (Milan, London); MP Miami (Miami); Mega Model Brazil (Sao Paulo)

Maria Izabel Goulart Dourado (born 23 October 1984) is a Brazilian fashion model. She is best known as having been one of the Victoria's Secret Angels from 2005 to 2008 and for her work with Sports Illustrated Swimsuit Issue and Armani Exchange.

== Early life and career ==
Goulart was born in São Carlos, São Paulo. She is of Portuguese and Italian descent and has four brothers and one sister. Goulart once said, "the hardest part about being [a Victoria's Secret Angel] is I spend time away from my mom's food and away from my home with my five siblings". School was a particularly rough time for Goulart, as she was made fun of for her skinny build and was called names such as "giraffe".

While shopping for groceries with her mother at age 14, a hairstylist suggested that she should become a model. She moved to the state capital, São Paulo, and started modeling, moving to France shortly afterwards to develop her career. Goulart returned to São Paulo in August 2001 (aged 16), where she joined former agency Success. Her career in the Brazilian fashion world was launched by Ney Alves, currently the director of Major Models Brazil.

== Modeling career ==
During Goulart's first ever fashion show appearance, she experienced a wardrobe malfunction when her top fell open. The incident made many Brazilian newspapers. She eventually put this event behind her and returned to the runway to model collections for A-list designers such as Alberta Ferretti, Bill Blass, Balenciaga, Bottega Veneta, Isabel Marant, Givenchy, Altuzarra, Oscar de la Renta, Valentino, Balmain, Jil Sander, Chanel, Michael Kors, Ralph Lauren, Emilio Pucci, Dolce and Gabbana, Emanuel Ungaro, Loewe, Roberto Cavalli and Stella McCartney, among others. Goulart has also modeled for H&M, Express, Neiman Marcus, Missoni and DSquared².

In 2005, Goulart appeared on the covers of the April edition of Marie Claire France and, in December, Vogue Brazil. She first appeared in the Victoria's Secret Fashion Show in 2005, the year she was contracted as an Angel. She received a star on the Hollywood "Walk of Fame" prior to the Victoria's Secret Fashion Show 2007. Although she is no longer an Angel, Goulart walked in every Victoria's Secret Fashion Show from 2005 to 2016. In 2008, she replaced fellow Victoria's Secret Angel Alessandra Ambrosio as the face of A/X Armani Exchange and she was featured in three seasonal print campaigns for the label.

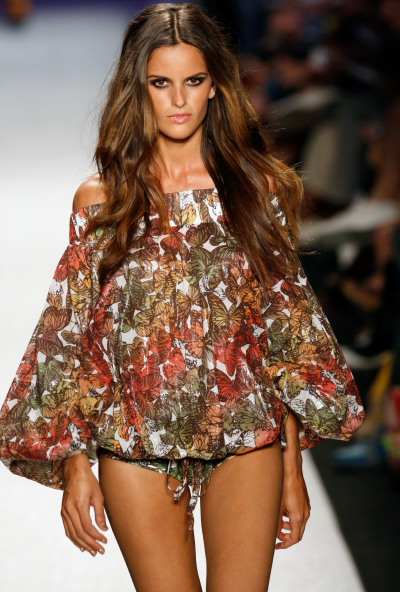
Goulart walking the runway

In 2010, Goulart appeared on the cover of the October issue for GQ Mexico, Vogue Brasil and appeared in a campaign for Avon. In the same year, she was voted the best international top model by the magazine Glamour Mexico.

In 2011, Goulart appeared in the Sports Illustrated Swimsuit Issue. She can be seen in the spring/summer 2011 campaign for Dolce and Gabbana, the Pre-Fall 2011 campaign for Givenchy, Yamamay's 10th Anniversary Collection and the Fall/Winter 2011 campaign for DKNY Jeans. The same year, she ranked number 100 in FHM magazine's list of the 100 Sexiest Women In The World. She also appeared on one of the four covers of Elle Brasil.

In February 2012, she was photographed by Dusan Reljin for Vogue Spain, and later that year by Mario Testino, again for Vogue Spain, in an editorial entitled "Las majas", which also featured Alessandra Ambrosio, Doutzen Kroes, Miranda Kerr and Isabeli Fontana. In November, she was recognised as "Fashion Personality of the Year" by the Brazilian magazine Isto é Gente, and she also appeared on the cover of Glamour Brazil in December 2012.

In February 2013 she appeared on the cover of one of the four issues of Vogue Brasil, together with Bette Franke, Magdalena Frackowiak, and Mirte Maas.

In mid-2013, she became the face of MAC Cosmetics Tropical Taboo range and she was photographed by Zee Nunes for the October edition of Vogue Brazil in an editorial entitled "Olympiada Fashion". Later that year she appeared in a campaign for Agua De Coco promoting its spring/summer 2014 beachwear collection. She also appeared on the cover of GQ Portugal in December 2013, after she was elected as the magazine's "International Woman of the Year" in May of that year.

== Public image ==
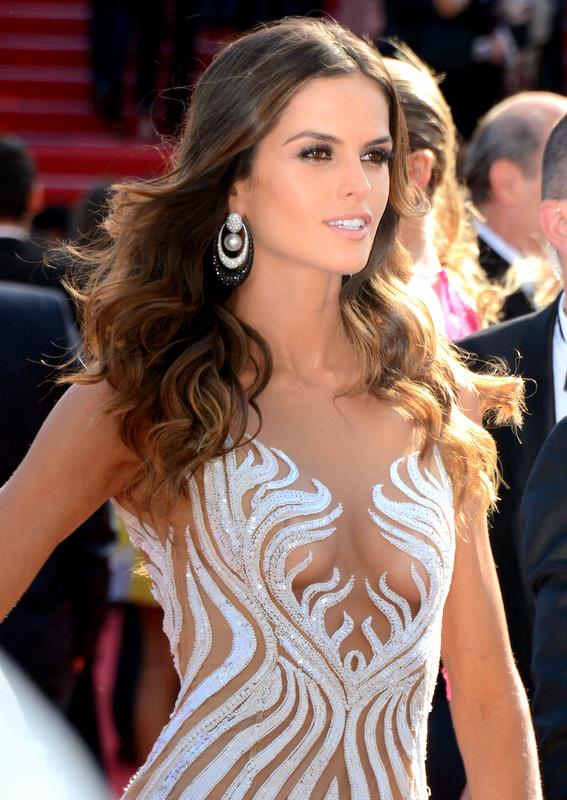
Goulart at the 2015 Cannes Film Festival

As a Victoria's Secret Angel, she was chosen as one of People magazine's annual "100 Most Beautiful People in the World" in May 2007.

== Personal life ==
Goluart can speak Portuguese, English and French.

Goulart, whose youngest brother, Guilherme, was diagnosed with type 1 diabetes at age 1, does charitable work, helping hospitals in her native Brazil to raise money to provide free insulin for diabetic children in need. She also has taken an active role with the Diabetes Research Institute (DRI) at the University of Miami, a recognized leader in cure-focused research. In 2009, Goulart became the DRI's international ambassador and in that role helps to promote the work of the DRI throughout her travels.

In 2006, she began dating Brazilian businessman Marcelo H. L. da Costa. The couple were engaged in 2009, but ended their relationship after eight years. In 2015, she began dating German footballer Kevin Trapp, the goalkeeper for Eintracht Frankfurt. On 5 July 2018, they became engaged.

== Notable appearances ==
- Goulart appeared in an episode of Two and a Half Men (season 4, episode 9: "Corey's Been Dead for an Hour").
- She made a guest appearance in the thirteenth episode of Season 3 of Entourage alongside fellow Angel Alessandra Ambrosio.
- Goulart was featured at the end of the 2016 Summer Olympics closing ceremony in Rio. The ceremony ended with a fireworks display and a tribute to Rio's signature event, the Carnival, which showcased Brazil's musical dance culture. The 250-person strong parade was led by Izabel Goulart and street cleaner Renato Sorriso, with the carnival anthem Cidade Maravilhosa playing in the background.
