= Doutzen Kroes =

Dutch fashion model (born 1985)

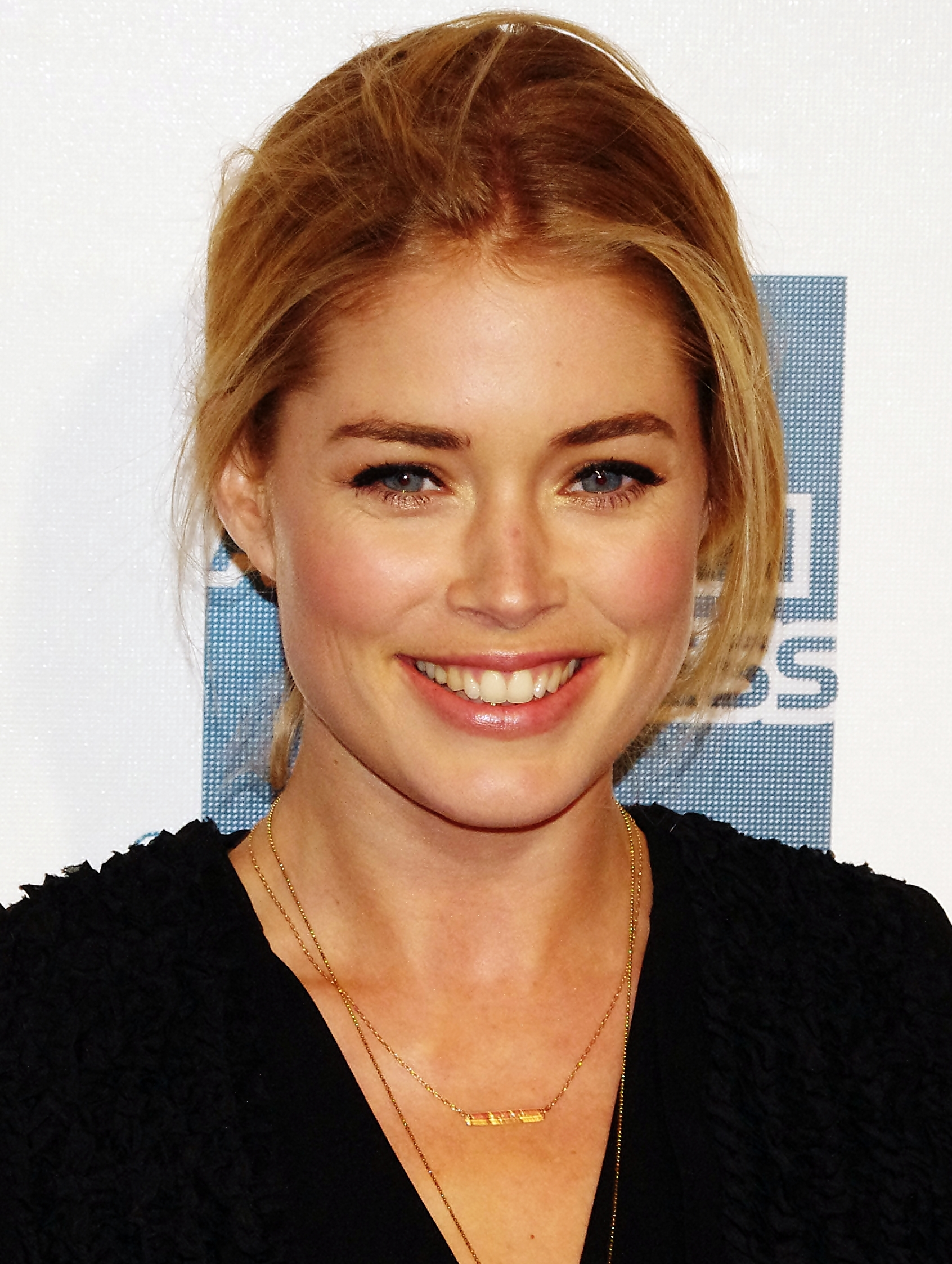
- Kroes at the Tribeca Film Festival in 2012
- Born: 23 January 1985 (age 41); Gytsjerk, Friesland, Netherlands
- Occupations: Model; actress; philanthropist
- Years active: 2003–present
- Spouse: Sunnery James Gorré (m. 2010)
- Children: 2
- Modeling information
- Height: 1.79 m (5 ft 10 1/2 in)
- Hair color: Blonde
- Eye color: Blue
- Agency: DNA Models (New York)

Doutzen Kroes (West Frisian: [ˈdɔutsn̩ ˈkrus], Dutch: [ˈdʌutsə(ŋ) ˈkrus]; born 23 January 1985) is a Dutch fashion model. She began her modelling career in 2003, in the Netherlands and was quickly sent by her agency to New York where she was cast by lingerie brand Victoria’s Secret. She was a Victoria's Secret Angel from 2008 until 2014, making her the second Dutch to earn the coveted title after Karen Mulder. She has been a brand ambassador for L'Oréal Paris since 2006. Kroes has been one of the highest-paid models, with an estimated income of more than $5 million per year, since 2008. In 2014, she came in second on the Forbes top-earning models list, estimated to have earned $8 million in one year. In 2013, she became the first model to land four different solo international covers of Vogue's September issue in a single year.

Her film debut was in Nova Zembla (2011).

== Early life ==
Doutzen Kroes was born on 23 January 1985, in the village of Eastermar (Dutch: Oostermeer) in the province of Friesland. Her mother, Geartsje Leistra, was a nurse, then a teacher, and her father, Johan Kroes, was a psychotherapist. In the 1970s, they were both champion speed skaters. As a young girl, Kroes aspired to be a professional speed skater.

Kroes has a younger sister, Rens, who is a nutritionist.

== Career ==
=== Modelling ===
Describing herself as a "tomboy" in her youth, she had never seriously considered modelling, but sent snapshots to modelling agency Paparazzi Model Management in Amsterdam, in 2003.

In 2005, Kroes won "Model of The Year" on Vogue.com by readers. She was presented on the May 2007 cover of Vogue as one of the "World's Next Top Models" along with Chanel Iman among others. Along with several of these models, she appeared in the 2008 Pirelli Calendar.

In 2006, a Frisian documentary directed by J.J.M. Jansen about a week in Kroes' life as a model was released. It documented Kroes at Milan Fashion Week and her thinking about the modelling industry. In July 2007, earning at an estimated total of $1.5 million in the previous twelve months, Forbes named Kroes fourteenth in the list of the world's 15 Top-Earning Supermodels. In April 2008, she was in fifth position, with an estimated income of $6 million. Forbes named Kroes fifth again in 2009 ($6 million), 2010 ($6 million) and 2012 ($6.9 million). Kroes escalated to the second position of the ranking in 2014, having earned $8 million the year before.

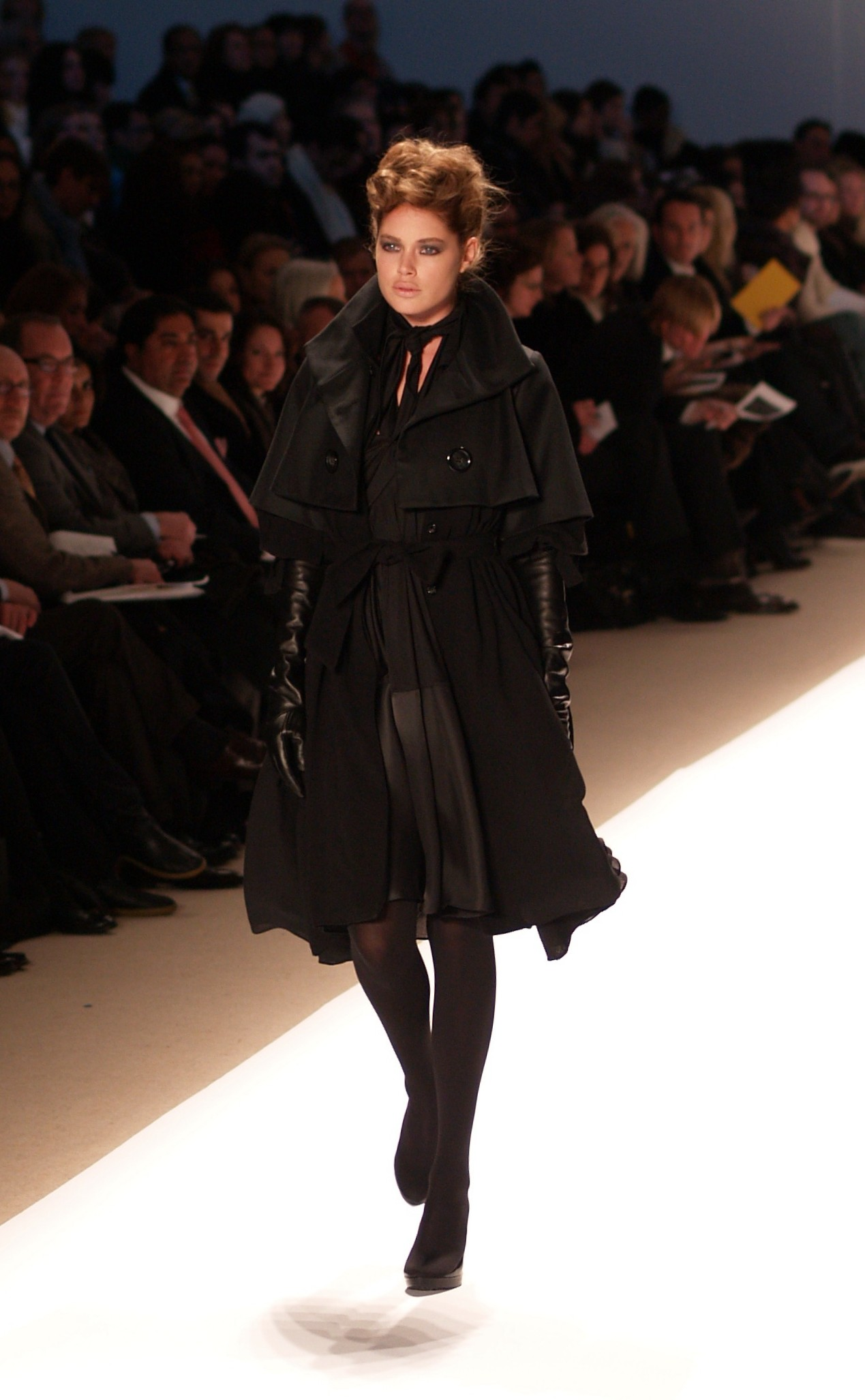
Kroes on the catwalk in 2007

At the end of August 2008, Victoria's Secret confirmed to People magazine that Kroes was to be the newest Victoria's Secret Angel. Her first campaign as the brand's newest Angel was "Supermodel Obsessions".

There is a wax figure of Kroes in the Amsterdam branch of Madame Tussaud's wax museum. From November 2009 to July 2010, Kroes wrote a monthly column about her life for the Dutch edition of Marie Claire.

In February 2010, Kroes returned to the catwalk during fashion week for Prada with fellow Angels Alessandra Ambrosio and Miranda Kerr. Prada was praised by former editor-in-chief of Glamour, Cosmopolitan and Marie Claire magazines, Bonnie Fuller in her blog for using a curvy model such as Kroes for the fashion show.

In September 2013, Kroes became the first model in history to appear on the cover of four international editions of Vogue in one month.

In 2014, Kroes appeared in the new Calvin Klein Reveal Fragrance commercial alongside Charlie Hunnam, as well as continuing her long-standing contracts. She also announced that she was ending her contract with Victoria's Secret after seven years of being with the brand; she walked in the 2005–2009 (excluding 2007), and 2011–2014 Victoria's Secret Fashion Shows.

In 2016, Kroes was announced as the spokesmodel for Dutch lingerie retailer Hunkemöller. Kroes released her own collection line 'Doutzen's Stories' and has starred in several campaigns for the Hunkemöller brand to date.

=== Acting ===
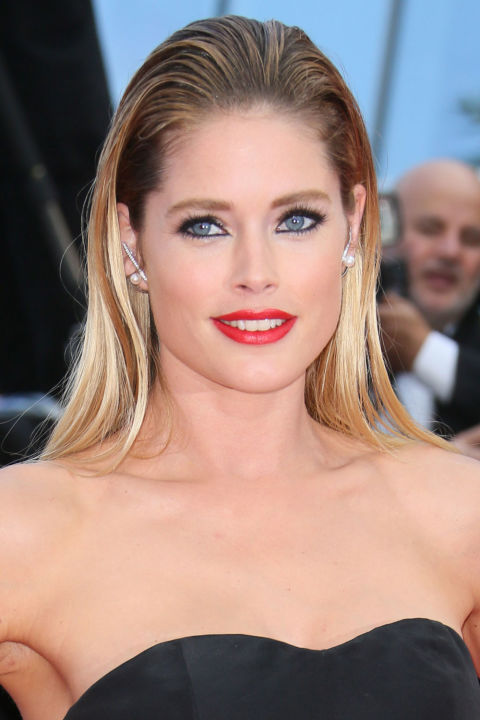
Kroes at the 2015 Cannes Film Festival

On 24 November 2011, Kroes debuted in Nova Zembla, the first Dutch 3D film made. Kroes has been taking acting classes in New York City for several years and has stated in interviews that she plans to act in more movies to come. In 2017, she appeared in the superhero film Wonder Woman, as an Amazon warrior.

=== Philanthropy ===
Kroes is actively involved with the non-profit organization Dance4Life, which uses song and dance to educate youth about HIV and AIDS prevention. She is also an ambassador for "Praat mar Frysk" ("Just speak Frisian") campaign which aims to promote the Frisian language, which is spoken in Kroes' native Friesland.

== Personal life ==
In 2009, Kroes started dating Dutch DJ Sunnery James Gorré. On 7 November 2010, she and Sunnery married in Eastermar. The couple have two children, a son and a daughter, both born in Amsterdam. In an April 2014 interview on the future of her daughter, Kroes said: "Instead of saying, 'You're so beautiful', I'll say, 'You're smart', so she'll have different aspirations in life than beauty and modelling. Though I love my job, I'm not changing the world. I'd love for her to study and to have different aspirations. We need to teach girls they can become presidents, and it's not about beauty all the time."

=== Controversy ===
Throughout the COVID-19 pandemic, Kroes has spread conspiracy theories about COVID-19 and vaccines. In September 2021, Kroes elicited some controversy by revealing her anti-vaccine point of view on Instagram, stating she would "not be forced to take the shot", in reference to the COVID-19 vaccine. In November 2021, Kroes shared a video on her Instagram account stating that COVID-19 vaccines are part of a plot by "satanists" to "reduce the global population". Kroes, whose net worth is estimated by Quote at €29 million, has also been criticised for applying for government compensation of loss of income due to COVID-19 while at the same time spreading misinformation about the pandemic.

== Filmography ==
Year	Title	Role	Notes
2011	Nova Zembla	Catharina Plancius	
2015	J'marche pas en arrière	Woman	Short film
2017	Wonder Woman	Venelia	
2017	Justice League	Venelia	
2020	Wonder Woman 1984	Venelia	
2021	Zack Snyder's Justice League	Venelia	

Television

Year	Title	Role	Notes
2005	Victoria's Secret Fashion Show 2005	Herself - Model	TV special
2006	Victoria's Secret Fashion Show 2006	Herself - Model	TV special
2008	Valentino: The Last Emperor	Herself - Model	Documentary
2008	Victoria's Secret Fashion Show 2008	Herself - Model	TV special
2009	Victoria's Secret Fashion Show 2009	Herself - Model	TV special
2009–2011	RTL Boulevard	Herself/co-host	TV series (4 episodes)
2011	Victoria's Secret Fashion Show 2011	Herself - Model	TV special
2012	Victoria's Secret Fashion Show 2012	Herself - Model	TV special
2013	Victoria's Secret Fashion Show 2013	Herself - Model	TV special
2013	L'Oréal Men Expert	Herself	Publicity
2013	RTL Late Night	Herself	TV series (Episode 1.84)
2014	Victoria's Secret Fashion Show 2014	Herself - Model	TV special
2024	Victoria's Secret Fashion Show 2024	Herself - Model	TV special
2025	Victoria's Secret Fashion Show 2025	Herself - Model	TV special

== See also ==
- Victoria's Secret Fashion Show
- The September Issue
- List of Victoria's Secret models
