= Erin Heatherton =

American model (born 1989)

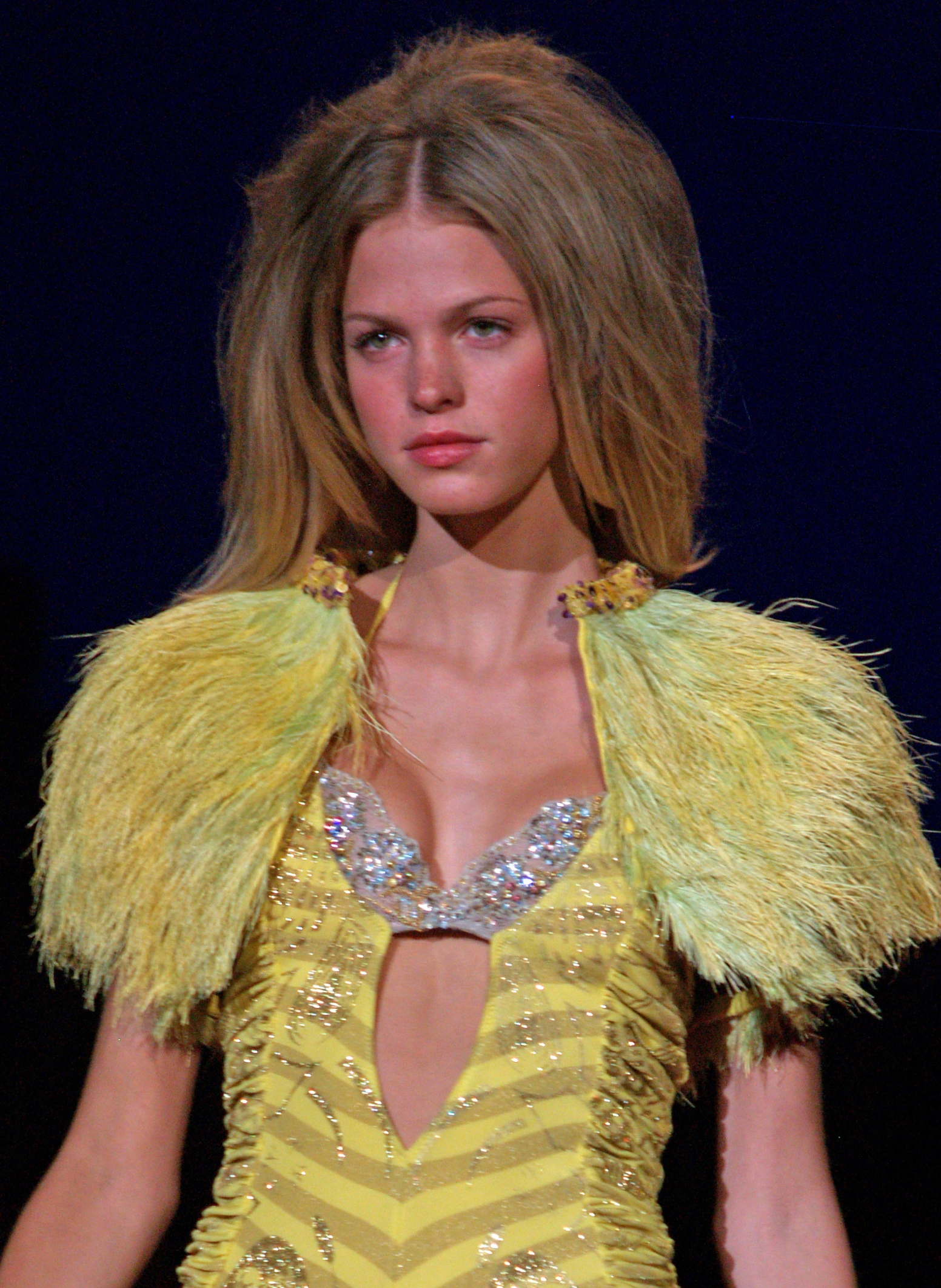
- Heatherton walking the runway for Custo Barcelona during Spring 2008 New York Fashion Week at Bryant Park
- Born: Erin Heather Bubley; March 4, 1989 (age 37); Skokie, Illinois, U.S.
- Occupation: Model
- Years active: 2006–2019
- Spouse: Karol Kocemba (m. 2023)
- Children: 1
- Modeling information
- Height: 5 ft 11 in (1.80 m)
- Hair color: Blonde
- Eye color: Green

Erin Heather Bubley (born March 4, 1989), known professionally as Erin Heatherton, is an American former model. She was a Victoria's Secret Angel from 2010 to 2013.

== Early life ==
Heatherton was born in Skokie, Illinois to Laura (née Stein) and Mark Bubley. She grew up there. Her family is Ashkenazi Jewish and she attended Solomon Schechter Day School, a Jewish day school, and Niles North High School in Skokie.

She competed in science fairs and played basketball for Niles North High School. When she was home from modeling work, three of her favorite places to visit were Second City Chicago, Flat Top (Stir-fry) Grill, an Asian fusion restaurant which was on Church Street in Evanston, Illinois, and Tommy Nevin's in Evanston, a pub that closed in November 2017.

== Career ==
=== 2006–2019: Modeling career ===
Heatherton was discovered by a modeling scout, Arri Taylor, while vacationing with a friend on South Beach, Miami. At the age of 17, Heatherton signed with the Marilyn Agency and moved to New York City. She made her runway debut in September 2006 at the Diane von Fürstenberg fashion show. She walked the runway for Prada, Stella McCartney, Chanel, Tommy Hilfiger, Marc Jacobs, Jason Wu, Carolina Herrera, Michael Kors, Christian Lacroix, Lacoste, Valentino, Oscar de la Renta, Zac Posen, Dolce & Gabbana, Moschino, L.A.M.B., Elie Saab, Carmen Marc Valvo, Derek Lam, Etro, and Isaac Mizrahi.

At 17, she booked her first cover with Italy's Flair. She appeared on the magazine covers of D, Grazia, Velvet, Elle (Serbia, Russia, France and Czech Republic) GQ (Spain, UK, Mexico and Germany), Beauty in Vogue, Ocean Drive, Russh, L'Officiel Hommes 2, Flair, and Muse. Additionally, she appeared in editorials for Mixte, Cosmopolitan, Glamour, Interview, Numero, V, Marie Claire, and Harper's Bazaar. Heatherton's advertising campaigns included Chopard, XOXO, Diesel, Versace, Lord & Taylor, Blanco, Buffalo Jeans, BLK DNM, John Galliano, H&M, Blugirl, Lacoste, Armani, Liu Jo, Valentino, Karl Lagerfeld, Osiris, Pronovias, and Dolce & Gabbana.

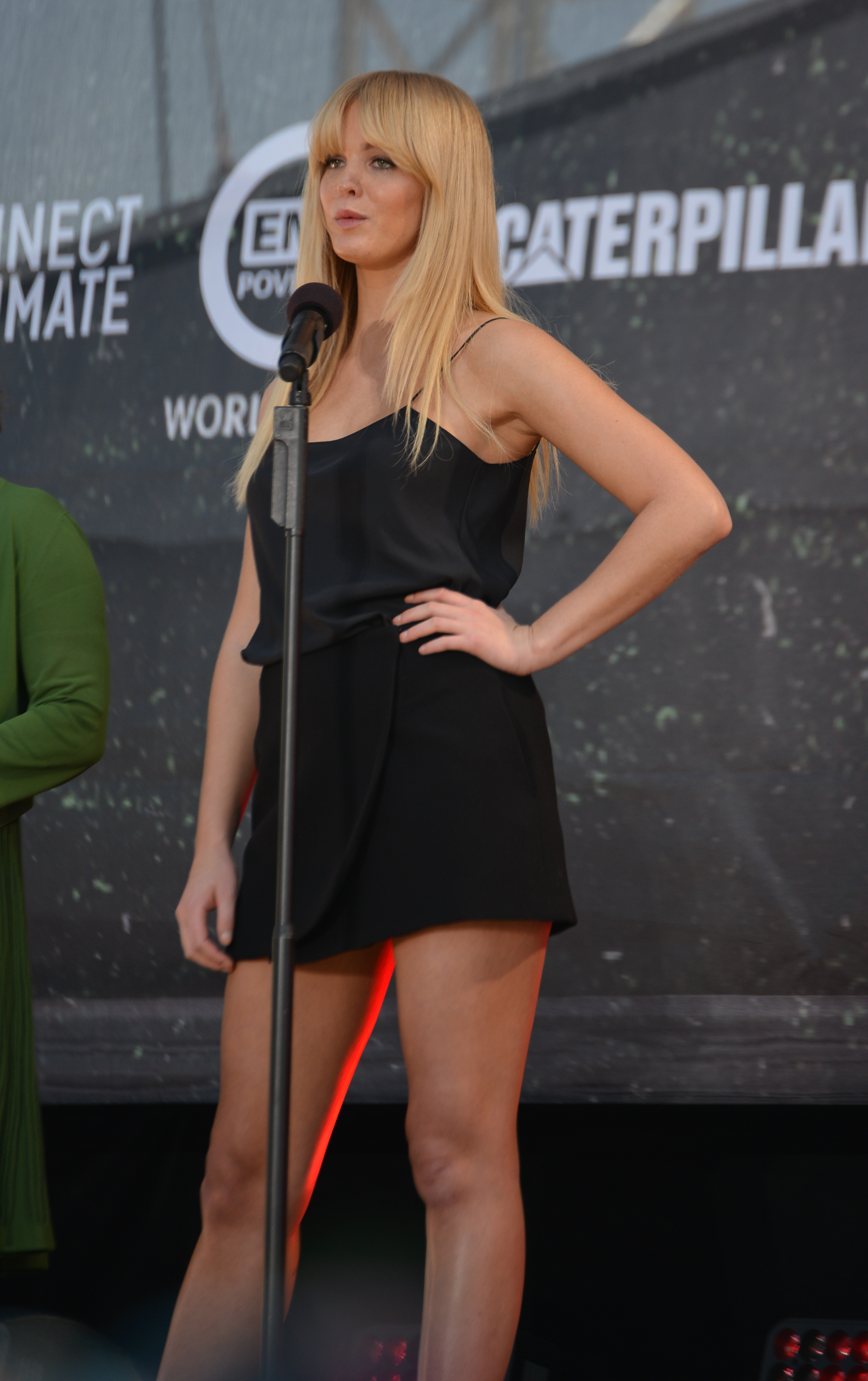
Heatherton in 2015

Heatherton began walking in the Victoria's Secret Fashion Show in 2008. She was an Victoria's Secret Angel from 2010 to 2013. She was in several television commercials and advertising campaigns for the brand, including a billboard in Manhattan, New York for the company's "Showstopper" launch. It was announced that Heatherton had signed with IMG in June 2013. She was ranked at number 35 on Askmen's list of the "Top 99 Most Desirable" women for 2013. She played in the annual exhibition basketball game 2014 NBA All-Star Celebrity Game on February 14, 2014. In January 2015, Heatherton became a brand ambassador for Curve Sport, a men's fragrance, and appeared in Victoria's Secret's "Very Sexy Now" fragrance's advertising campaign in the spring of 2015. She modeled in Sports Illustrated Swimsuit Issues in 2015 and 2016. In 2016, she was featured in various campaigns for Adore Cosmetics and became a brand ambassador for the NFL Women's Apparel Collection. She modeled for Kikirio Swimwear in 2017.

In 2019, she signed with Select Model Management in London. After having been on hiatus, she returned and appeared on the cover of Chicago Splash magazine in November 2019.

=== 2020–present: Business ventures ===
In February 2021, Heatherton co-founded Resistance Chicago Lagree, a group fitness studio in Chicago; her husband, Karol Kocemba is the other co-founder. She wrote about her decision to open a fitness studio on the company's blog post: "I started a fitness studio because it was a way for me to take something that I am genuinely passionate about and share it directly with the people around me. It was important to me that the next chapter of my life after modeling was more authentic. My passion was never lingerie, luxury products, or social media. My proudest accomplishment is not what my body looked like when it was framed by angel wings on a runway. My proudest accomplishment is building Resistance, channeling the challenges from my past into something that helps people feel good about their bodies."

== Personal life ==
She lives in Chicago and is the godmother to model Lily Aldridge’s daughter. She has supported numerous charities including Global Poverty Project and the Global Citizen Festival, a concert to combat poverty held in Central Park which attracted 60,000 attendees. Morton Square Condominium in the West Village filed a civil lawsuit against Heatherton saying that the model "regularly causes and allows unreasonable levels of noise and bass vibrations... disturbing the condo's residents and interfering with their ability to use and enjoy their units". Fashion stylist Clare Byrne sued Heatherton in 2017 for $10 million as compensation for failing to launch RetroActive, a proposed sportswear line.

In April 2019, Heatherton filed for bankruptcy, claiming to be "more than $500,000 in debt and (I) made less than $3,000 this year". $100,000 of the debt was to Byrne, her former business partner. Heatherton dated actor Leonardo DiCaprio from December 2011 to November 2012.

On March 2, 2022, Heatherton announced that she and Polish American trader Karol Kocemba were engaged. On January 17, 2023, she confirmed through social media that they had married. They welcomed a daughter in April 2024.

== Filmography ==
Film roles
Year	Title	Role	Notes
2013	Grown Ups 2	Ginger	
2014	She's Funny That Way	Hotel Guest #2	

Television roles
Year	Title	Role	Notes
2008–2013	The Victoria's Secret Fashion Show	Herself / Model	Television special
2013	The League	Coach Crowley	Episode: "The Credit Card Alert"
2013	Global Citizen Festival	Herself	Television special
2014	Million Dollar Contractor	Herself	Episode: "Supermodel Pad"
2016	73 Questions	Herself	Uncredited; Episode: " 73 Questions with Derek Zoolander"
