= Constance Jablonski =

French model (born 1991)

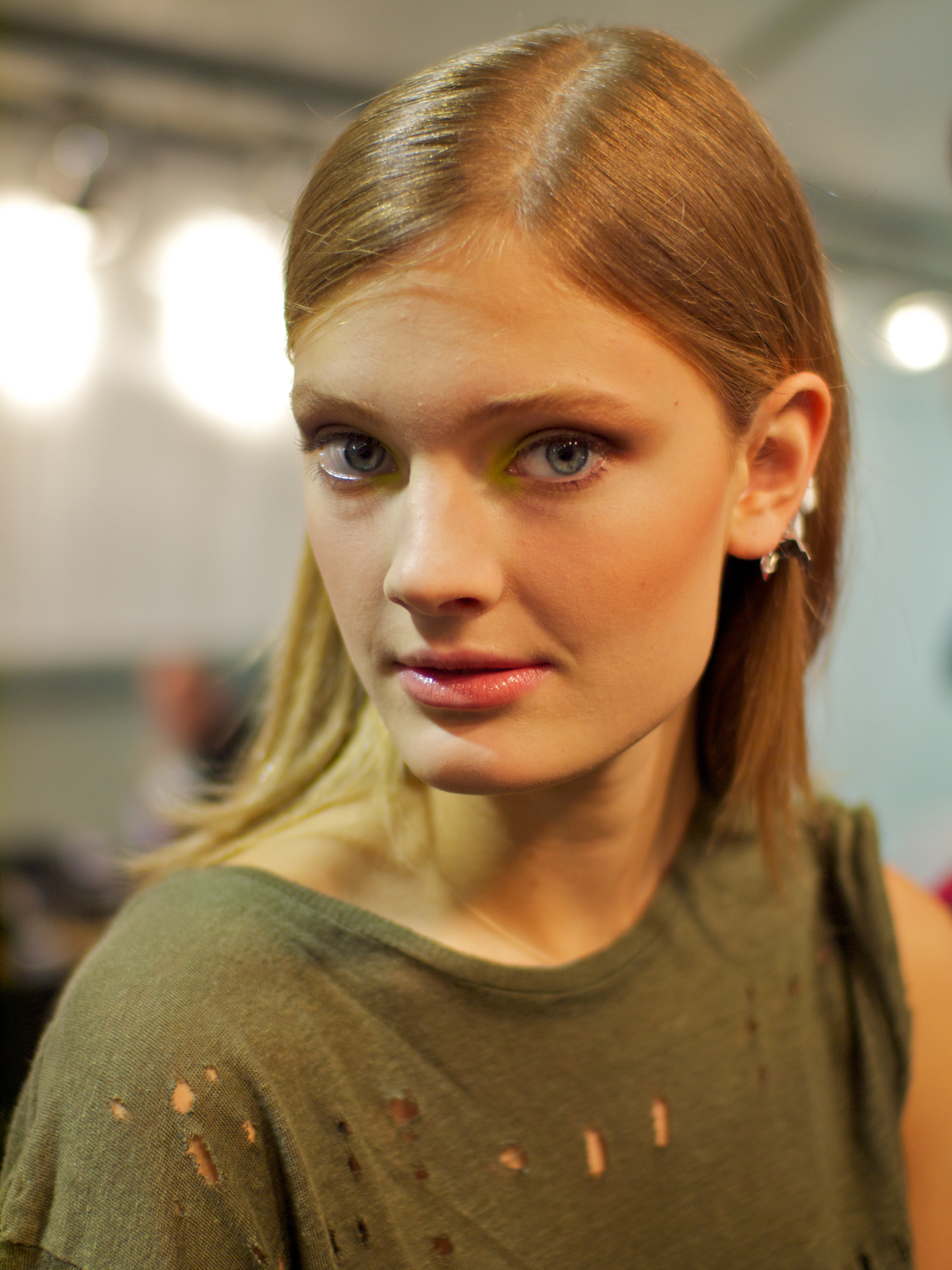
- Jablonski in 2010
- Born: Constance Jablonski; 17 April 1991 (age 35); Lille, France
- Spouse: Matthias Dandois (m. 2020)
- Children: 1
- Modeling information
- Height: 1.80 m (5 ft 11 in)
- Hair color: Blonde
- Eye color: Blue
- Agency: DNA Model Management (New York); VIVA Model Management (Paris, London, Barcelona); IBTM (Amsterdam)

Constance Jablonski (born 17 April 1991) is a French model. In 2006, she entered the French Elite Model Look Contest. As of 2010, she became one of the newer faces of Estée Lauder alongside Liu Wen and Joan Smalls. She made her catwalk debut in September 2008 and has walked for designers including Dior, Gucci, and Alexander McQueen.

== Early life ==
Constance Jablonski was born in Lille, France. Her father is a dermatologist, and his parents immigrated from Poland to northern France after World War II. Jablonski's mother is French, and a pharmacist. She has an older brother named François-Xavier. Prior to becoming a model, she wanted to be a tennis player and was a keen competitive player for nine years. Jablonski also considered becoming a plastic surgeon, and was set to start schooling after she graduated from high school.

== Career ==
She got her start in the modelling industry in the French Elite Model Look Contest of 2006. Jablonski made her catwalk debut in September 2008 at the fashion weeks in New York, Milan and Paris. She has walked the runways of New York, Paris, Milan and London, both in the Ready-to-wear and Haute Couture seasons. Jablonski has walked for Shiatzy Chen, Donna Karan, Dior, Gucci, Burberry, Yves Saint Laurent, Alexander McQueen, Balmain, Balenciaga, Zac Posen, Sonia Rykiel and Elie Saab, among many others. In November 2010, she walked in the Victoria's Secret Fashion Show for the first time.

She has appeared in advertising campaigns for brands such as Alberta Ferretti, Cesare Paciotti, D&G, Donna Karan, Calvin Klein, Hermes, Nine West, Majestic Filatures, Max Mara, Barneys, Topshop, Tse, H&M, Bally, GAP, Moschino, United Colors of Benetton, Estee Lauder, and Y-3. In April 2010, it was announced that Jablonski and Chinese model Liu Wen would join the roster of faces of the cosmetics company Estée Lauder.

Jablonski has appeared on the covers of Russh, Chinese, German, Portuguese, Greek, Spanish and Russian Vogue, French Revue de Modes, Russian Harper's Bazaar, and Italian Amica. She has appeared in editorials for French, Japanese, German, Chinese, British, Russian, Italian, American, Teen, Greek, Korean, Spanish, and Portuguese Vogue, Italian Marie Claire, Allure, Harper's Bazaar, Russh, Vanity Fair, American and Korean W, Interview, V, i-D, French and Japanese Numéro.

She was ranked 11th on the Top 50 Models Women List by models.com. As of January 2016, she is listed both in Industry Icons and The Money Girls rankings by models.com.

== Personal life ==
In 2020, she married French cyclist Matthias Dandois and in June 2022, they announced they were expecting their first child. On November 18, 2022, the couple revealed the birth via Instagram.
