= Magdalena Frąckowiak =

Polish model (born 1984)

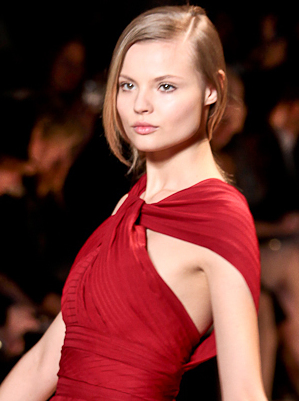
- Frąckowiak wearing Elie Saab in 2011
- Born: Magdalena Frąckowiak; 8 October 1984 (age 41); Gdańsk, Poland
- Modeling information
- Height: 1.80 m (5 ft 11 in)
- Hair color: Dark Blond
- Eye color: Hazel
- Agency: Model Management (Hamburg)

Magdalena Frąckowiak (Polish: [maɡdaˈlɛna frɔnt͡sˈkɔvjak]; born 8 October 1984) is a Polish model and jewelry designer. Vogue Paris declared her one of the top 30 models of the 2000s. She began appearing on runways between 2001 and 2002 but she achieved a breakthrough in her career in the mid-2000s.

== Early life ==
Born in Gdańsk, Poland, Frąckowiak was sixteen when her mother Danuta sent her pictures to a Warsaw agency's modeling contest, which she won. Her first paid assignment was for Machina magazine. Frąckowiak resided in Mississauga, Ontario, Canada when she moved from Poland.

== Career ==
Frąckowiak featured prominently in the 2008 Ralph Lauren, Alessandro Dell'Acqua, and Oscar de la Renta print campaigns, and she has been on the cover of Italian, German, Japanese, and Russian Vogue and French Revue de Modes. Vogue Paris declared her one of the top 30 models of the 2000s.

Frąckowiak walked the 2010, 2012, 2013, 2014 and 2015 Victoria's Secret Fashion Shows, and has a starring role in the Lagerfeld-directed video for the brand Hogan, alongside Baptiste Giabiconi and Sebastien Jondeau, which hit stores at the end of January 2011.

She has walked for many top runways including Shiatzy Chen, Elie Saab, Miu Miu, Chanel, Gianfranco Ferré, Hakaan, John Galliano, Viktor & Rolf, Christian Dior, Lanvin, Balmain, Roberto Cavalli, Dolce & Gabbana, Emilio Pucci, Fendi, Prada, Givenchy, Versace, Etro, D&G, Ralph Lauren, Oscar de la Renta, Alexander Wang, Louis Vuitton, Giorgio Armani, Jean Paul Gaultier, Hermès, Chloé, Karl Lagerfeld, Balenciaga, MaxMara, Blumarine, & Paco Rabanne.

In 2011, she appeared in the Spring 2011 Campaign for Reserved. Frąckowiak is also featured in the 2011 Pirelli Calendar photographed by Karl Lagerfeld.

In mid-2015, she launched her own jewelry brand Magdalena Frąckowiak Jewelry. In March 2018, she announced she was creating a YouTube channel titled, "Magdalena the Queen".

In 2019, she appeared as a special guest in the 8th edition of Polish reality show Top Model.

In 2023, she returned to modelling after a few years' hiatus and took part in the 2023 Paris Fashion Week presenting the Schiaparelli collection.

== Personal life ==
She was in a relationship with Italian artist Carlito Dalceggio between 2009 and 2010. From 2010 until 2013, her partner was Wojciech Pastor. Between 2016 and 2018, she was in a relationship with entrepreneur Alexander "Alex" Przetakiewicz. In 2019, she expressed interest in visiting Nepal in order to study Buddhism and meditation but ultimately did not pursue the monastic life as claimed and returned to modelling.
