= Alice Herbst =

Swedish former fashion model (born 1993)

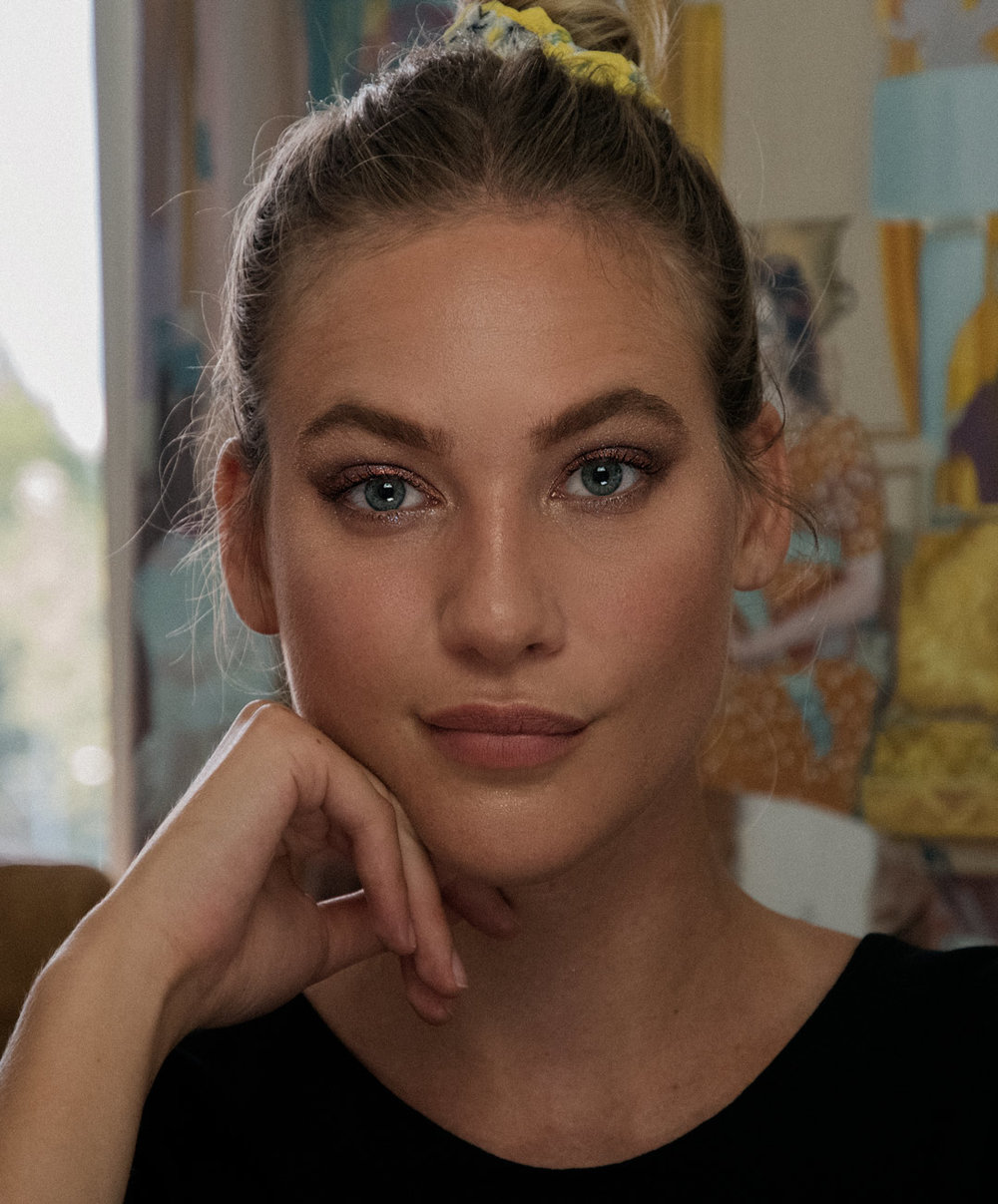
- Portrait of Alice Herbst
- Born: Alice Minna Irmeli Herbst; April 13, 1993 (age 33); Stockholm, Sweden
- Occupations: Model, Artist
- Years active: 2012 (modelling); 2012-present (Artist)
- Modeling information
- Height: 5 ft 10 in (1.78 m)
- Hair color: Blonde
- Eye color: Blue

Alice Minna Irmeli Herbst (born April 13, 1993) is a Swedish former fashion model and artist, best known for winning the fifth cycle of Sweden's Next Top Model in 2012. She is the cousin of Victoria's Secret model Elsa Hosk.

Herbst gave up modeling in August 2012 after discovering the poor work ethics of the industry.

== Early life and education ==
Herbst was born in Stockholm, Sweden, in 1993. She studied at the Stockholm School of Fine Art, graduating in 2015, and later graduated from the Gerlesborg School of Fine Art in 2017.

== Art career ==
After leaving modelling, Herbst developed a career as a painter. Her artistic practice often begins with staged environments and handmade props made from materials such as cardboard, paper and fabric. These constructions are photographed and used as references for paintings.

Vogue Scandinavia described Herbst's cardboard and paper tableaus as "adult-size dollhouses", noting that the approach traces back to childhood scene-making. Tang Contemporary Art has described her process as involving handmade scenes and props arranged in the manner of a set designer.

In 2023, Herbst created paintings for a collaboration with Harper's Bazaar Germany and Max Mara. Shortly after completing her studies, she was invited to lecture at the Ferrari Design Center in Maranello, Italy.

== Selected exhibitions ==
- 2026 – The Whispering Game, Beers London, London
- 2026 – The Sun Shone from a Different Place, Tang Contemporary Art, Hong Kong
- 2025 – The Tourists, Tang Contemporary Art, Seoul
- 2023 – Face to Face II, Gillian Jason Gallery, London
- 2022 – Spring Saloon, Liljevalchs konsthall, Stockholm

== Personal life ==
According to Aftonbladet, Herbst had body dysmorphic disorder as a teenager.
