= Top Model Sverige =

- Created by: Tyra Banks
- Presented by: Caroline Winberg (3–4); Former; Vendela Kirsebom (1); Izabella Scorupco (2)
- Country of origin: Sweden
- No. of episodes: 74

Production
- Running time: 45 minutes (without commercials)

Original release
- Network: TV3
- Release: 12 September 2007 – 1 May 2014

Top Model Sverige (English: Top Model Sweden) is a Swedish reality television show based on America's Next Top Model. It was broadcast on TV3 in Sweden. The first season, Top Model Stockholm (abbreviated as Sthlm), aired in 2007 and was hosted by Vendela Kirsebom. The show returned to TV3 in 2012 with Izabella Scorupco as host. However, she also lasted for one season only and was replaced by Caroline Winberg who hosted the show's third and fourth seasons.

== Show format ==
During the second season the show also saw a unique twist when the entire judging, held in Los Angeles, was done in English due to some members of the panel regulars were not able to speak Swedish.

Season 4 featured both female and male participants, and the cast number rose to 14 from 10. In addition, the season broadcast 40 episodes over 10 weeks.

== Cycles ==
Cycle	Premiere date	Winner	Runner-up	Other contestants in order of elimination	Number of contestants	International Destinations
1	12 September 2007	Hawa Ahmed	Margarita Maiseyenka	Albulena Grajqevci, Linda Lindén, Hanna Markendahl, Pauline Naisubi, Nadia Borra & Daniella Pedersen, Malin Karlén, Jenny Andersson, Pia Cossa Åkesson, Sanna Lindfors	12	None
2	31 January 2012	Alice Herbst	Klara Kassman	Linnéa Melander, Ivana Komso, Sophie Angner, Jamilla Idris, Jenny Hammarlund, Victoria Eriksson, Sibel Kara, Nina Strauss, Rebecka Skiöld-Nielsen	11	Los Angeles; Berlin
3	21 January 2013	Josefin Gustafsson	Shams Ben-Mannana	Eleonore Lilja (disqualified), Fatou Khan, Izabell Hahn, Afnan Maaz, Josefin Toomson, Jasmine Sjöberg Sidibe, Malin Ekholm, Pamela Olivera	10	Los Angeles
4	24 February 2014	Feben Negash	Ellinor Bjurström	Fanny Karlsson, Astrid Wesström, Sanel Dzubur, David Lundin, Sebastian Lysén, Joakim Journath, Elzana Kadric, Kevin Montero & Jennifer Larsén, Kostas Vlastaras, Michael Gustafsson, Agnes Hedengård	14	Frankfurt; Cape Town

== See also ==
- Top Model (Scandinavia)
