= List of Vogue Scandinavia cover models =

This list of Vogue Scandinavia cover models (2021–present) is a catalog of cover models who have appeared on the cover of Vogue Scandinavia, the Scandinavian edition of American fashion magazine Vogue.

== 2021 ==
Issue	Cover model	Photographer	Ref.
August/September	Greta Thunberg	Alexandrov Klum	
October/November	Helena Christensen	Henrik Bülow	
December/January 2022	Malaika Holmén	Benjamin Huseby	

== 2022 ==
Issue	Cover model	Photographer	Ref.
February/March	Prince Nikolai of Denmark	Tim Hill James Finnigan	
April/May	Elsa Hosk; Tom Daly	Torbjørn Rødland	
June/July	Alicia Vikander	Thomas Cristiani	
August/September	Kelly Gale; Joel Kinnaman	Ellen von Unwerth	
October/November	Ceval Omar	Dan Beleiu	
December/January 2023	Tove Lo	Daniella Midenge	

== 2023 ==
Issue	Cover model	Photographer	Ref.
February/March	Paulina Porizkova	Arseny Jabiev	
April/May	Zara Larsson	Camilla Akrans	
June/July	Amandla Stenberg	Markn	
August/September	Pernille Teisbaek	Petra Kleis	
October/November	Loreen	Koto Bolofo	
December/January 2024	Marianne Theodorsen, Nina Sandbech, Janka Polliani, Darja Baarnnik	Arran & Jules	

== 2024 ==
Issue	Cover model	Photographer	Ref.
February/March	Vilma Sjöberg	Camilla Akrans	
April/May	Björk	Viðar Logi	
June/July	Rebecca Ferguson	Marcus Ohlsson	
August/September	Lily Collins	Desiree Mattsson	
October/November	Giovanna Battaglia Engelbert	Marcus Ohlsson	
December/January 2025	Princess Sofia of Sweden	Hassenielsen Studio	

== 2025 ==
Issue	Cover model	Photographer	Ref
February/March	Renate Reinsve, Halfdan Ullmann Tøndel	Marc Hibbert	
April/May	Elsa Hosk	Yulia Gorbachenko	
June/July	Viktor Gyökeres	Élio Nogueira	
August/September	Laufey	Jason Kim	
October/November	Suvi Koponen, Moomin	Jesse Laitinen	
December/January 2026	Pamela Anderson	Casper Sejersen	

== 2026 ==
Issue	Cover model	Photographer	Ref
February/March	Anine Bing	Janne Rugland	
April/May	Robyn	Aidan Zamiri	
June/July	Axwell, Sebastian Ingrosso, Steve Angello	Clem Protin	
August/September	Princess Madeleine, Duchess of Hälsingland and Gästrikland	Elisabeth Toll	
October/November	Pernille Døsvik, Johannes Høsflot Klæbo	Ole Martin Halvorsen	
