= Vendela Kirsebom =

Norwegian-Swedish model and actress (born 1967)

- Born: Vendela Maria Kirsebom; 12 January 1967 (age 59); Stockholm, Sweden
- Other names: Vendela; Vendela K. Thommessen; Vendela K. Thomessen
- Occupations: Actress; Model
- Years active: 1988–present
- Height: 1.73 m (5 ft 8 in)
- Spouses: Olaf Thommessen (m. 1996; sep. 2007) Petter Pilgaard (m. 2022)
- Children: 2
- Modeling information
- Hair color: Blonde
- Eye color: Blue

Vendela Maria Kirsebom (born 12 January 1967) is a Norwegian-Turkish-Swedish model, actress, and host.

== Early life and education ==
Kirsebom was born in Stockholm, Sweden, to a Norwegian mother and a Turkish father.

At the age of 13, she was discovered in a Stockholm restaurant by Eileen Ford. At age 18, she graduated from the Oslo Waldorf School and moved to Italy to pursue a modeling career under the guidance of Ford Models.

== Career ==
Kirsebom moved to New York City at age 20 and signed a six-year contract with Elizabeth Arden soon after, in addition to modeling for fashion brands in the United States and Europe. During the 1990s, Kirsebom appeared on the magazine covers of the Sports Illustrated Swimsuit Issue, Vogue, Cosmopolitan, Harper's Bazaar, Brides, Flare, Shape, FHM and Zest. In 1996, she became a Goodwill Ambassador for UNICEF.

Kirsebom appeared in Batman and Robin in 1997 as Nora Fries and played the bridal gown model in the 1998 movie The Parent Trap, starring Lindsay Lohan, Natasha Richardson, and Dennis Quaid. She was also featured in the Disney Channel's Model Behavior with Justin Timberlake and Maggie Lawson. Kirsebom appeared as herself in 1995 episodes of The Larry Sanders Show and Murphy Brown, and made a cameo as a "space villainess" in a "Pigs in Space" skit on Muppets Tonight. She also lent her voice to a fictionalized version of herself on Johnny Bravo.

In 1999, Kirsebom hosted the Swedish music competition Melodifestivalen 1999, the competition that determines the country's representative for the Eurovision Song Contest. From 2006 to 2008, she hosted the Norwegian version of Top Model, and also hosted the fourth cycle of the Swedish version in 2007.

Kirsebom released her autobiography in 2017. In 2023, she walked the runway for Sports Illustrated's Swimsuit Runway Show at Miami Swim Week.

== Personal life ==
Kirsebom was engaged to American film producer Jon Peters during the early 1990s. In 1996, she married Norwegian politician Olaf Thommessen, with whom she shares two daughters. They separated in 2007 after 11 years of marriage.

In 2019, Kirsebom got engaged to Petter Pilgaard and married him in June 2022 after a postponement due to the COVID-19 pandemic.

In addition to Swedish, Norwegian and Danish, Kirsebom speaks German, Italian and English fluently.

== Filmography ==
=== Film ===
Year	Title	Role	Notes
1997	Batman & Robin	Nora Fries	
1998	The Parent Trap	Bridal Gown Model	

=== Television ===
Year	Title	Role	Notes
1988	Piazza Navona	Ingrid Allberg	Episode: "Cuore di ladro"
1992	Blossom	Fairy Godmother	Episode: "Driver's Education"
1995	Murphy Brown	Herself	Episode: "Model Relationships"
1995	The Larry Sanders Show	Herself	Episode: "The Bump"
1995	Dweebs	Greta Nyquist	Episode: "The Actress Show"
1996	Muppets Tonight	Princess Vendela	Episode: "Jason Alexander"
1997	Johnny Bravo	Herself (voice)	Episode: "Talk to Me, Baby"
1999	Melodifestivalen 1999	Host	Television special
2000	Model Behavior	Herself	Television film
2005	Romy and Michele: In the Beginning	Herself	Television film
2005–2007	Top Model Sverige	Host	4 episodes
2006–2008	Top Model Norge	Host	3 episodes
