= Damernas Värld =

Swedish women's magazine

- Categories: Women's magazine; Fashion magazine
- Frequency: Monthly
- Publisher: Bonnier Tidskrifter
- Founded: 1939
- First issue: 1 November 1939; 86 years ago
- Company: Bonnier
- Country: Sweden
- Based in: Stockholm
- Language: Swedish
- Website: Damernas Värld
- ISSN: 0011-5916
- OCLC: 487380359

Damernas Värld (Swedish: Women's World) is a Swedish language monthly fashion and women's magazine published in Stockholm, Sweden. Founded in 1939 it is one of the oldest magazines in the country.

== History and profile ==
The magazine was started with the name Flitiga Händer (Swedish: Busy Hands) in November 1939. In 1940 it was renamed as Damernas Värld with the subtitle Flitiga händer. In 1944 the subtitle was removed, and it began to appear with the title Damernas Värld. The magazine is part of Bonnier Group and is published on a monthly basis by Bonnier Tidskrifter.

Gunny Widell and Martina Bonnier served as the editors-in-chief of the magazine. Its headquarters is in Stockholm. Although the main focus of the magazine is fashion, it also features articles on health and beauty. Since 1982 the magazine offers the Damernas Värld Guldknappen, an annual award recognizing Swedish fashion designers.

Damernas Värld celebrated its seventy-fifth anniversary with a cover featuring the editor-in-chief Martina Bonnier in April 2015. The magazine was integrated into the website of the Expressen newspaper along with other Bonnier magazines such as Sköna hem and Allt om Mat in May 2021.

== Circulation ==
Damernas Värld reached its peak circulation during the 1960s and 1970s. The circulation of the magazine was 102,000 copies in 1999. The magazine had a circulation of 87,300 copies in 2010. Its circulation was 85,000 copies in 2013 and 72,300 copies in 2014.

== See also ==
- List of magazines in Sweden
