= Small Chops =

2020 Nigerian drama film

- Promotional poster
- Directed by: Robert O. Peters
- Produced by: Chika Ike; Serah Donalds
- Starring: Toyin Abraham; Chika Ike; Max Cavenham
- Production company: Flipscript Entertainment
- Distributed by: FilmOne Entertainment
- Release date: 31 January 2020
- Running time: 130 minutes
- Country: Nigeria
- Language: English
- Box office: ₦24.9million

Small Chops is a 2020 Nigerian drama film directed by Robert O. Peters and produced by Chika Ike. It stars Toyin Abraham, Chika Ike and Max Cavenham in the lead roles. The film was predominantly shot in Lagos and edited in the United States. It was released theatrically on 31 January 2020 and grossed over ₦20 million at the box office.

== Synopsis ==
Nikita is an Afro sexy dancer at a bar who catches the attention of Casper, an upright business mogul.

== Cast ==
- Chika Ike as Nikita
- Toyin Abraham as bar manager
- Max Cavenham as Casper
- Rachael Okonkwo as Uzor
- Nkem Owoh as Smart
- Afeez Oyetoro as Rashid
- Omotunde Adebowale David as Amaka
- Nse Ikpe-Etim as Magdalene
- Eucharia Anunobi as Mama B
- Cynthia Ebijie as young Nikita
- Sophie Alakija as Celine
- Emeka Amadi as bar bouncer
- Elvis Ebideri as bar patron
- Jojo Ewuru as Adi
- Emeka Ikwuegbu as thug
- Christian Paul as Uncle Rufus
- Yewande Osamein as lady 3
- Love Nebo as Dada
- Peace Joseph as restaurant guest
- Clinton Ibeto as policeman 2
- Genevieve Fadeh as mistress
- Anietie Effiong as bar patron
- Lawrence Edomaobi as bar bouncer
