= Top Model Sverige season 2 =

Top Model Sverige
- Season 2
- Presented by: Izabella Scorupco
- Judges: Izabella Scorupco; Jonas Hallberg; Alexis Borges
- No. of episodes: 10

Release
- Original network: TV3
- Original release: January 31 – April 10, 2012

Season chronology
- Next → Season 3

Top Model Sverige, season 2 was the second season of the Swedish reality television show in which a number of women compete for the title of Sweden's Next Top Model and a chance to start their career in the modelling industry. The prize also included a feature in Swedish Elle and a contract with NEXT Model Management. The finalists lived and competed in Los Angeles.

== Contestants ==
(ages stated are at start of contest)

Contestant	Age	Height	Hometown	Finish	Place
Linnéa Melander	24	1.77 m (5 ft 9 1/2 in)	Stockholm	Episode 2	11
Ivana Komso	21	1.76 m (5 ft 9 1/2 in)	Eskilstuna	Episode 2	10
Sophie Angner	21	1.74 m (5 ft 8 1/2 in)	Stockholm	Episode 3	9
Jamilla Idris	18	1.72 m (5 ft 7 1/2 in)	Stockholm	Episode 4	8
Jenny Hammarlund	18	1.80 m (5 ft 11 in)	Falköping	Episode 5	7
Victoria Eriksson	22	1.75 m (5 ft 9 in)	Stockholm	Episode 6	6
Sibel Kara	23	1.77 m (5 ft 9 1/2 in)	Gothenburg	Episode 7	5
Nina Strauss	18	1.74 m (5 ft 8 1/2 in)	Lidingö	Episode 8	4
Rebecka Skiöld-Nielsen	17	1.74 m (5 ft 8 1/2 in)	Norrköping	Episode 9	3
Klara Kassman	17	1.84 m (6 ft 1/2 in)	Kärrtorp	Episode 11	2
Alice Herbst	18	1.78 m (5 ft 10 in)	Spånga	Episode 11	1

== Episodes ==
=== Episode 1 ===
Original Air Date: January 31, 2012

=== Episode 2 ===
Original Air Date: January 31, 2012

- Eliminated outside of judging panel: Linnéa Melander
- First call-out: Jamilla Idris
- Bottom two: Ivana Komso & Rebecka Skiöld-Nielsen
- Eliminated: Ivana Komso

=== Episode 3 ===
Original Air Date: February 7, 2012

- First call-out: Jenny Hammarlund
- Bottom two: Sibel Kara & Sophie Angner
- Eliminated: Sophie Angner

=== Episode 4 ===
Original Air Date: February 14, 2012

- First call-out: Victoria Eriksson
- Bottom two: Jamilla Idris & Klara Kassman
- Eliminated: Jamilla Idris
- Special guests: Emina Cunmulaj, Luiz Mattos

=== Episode 5 ===
Original Air Date: February 28, 2012

- Bottom two: Jenny Hammarlund & Victoria Eriksson
- Eliminated: Jenny Hammarlund

=== Episode 6 ===
Original Air Date: February 28, 2012

- First call-out: Sibel Kara
- Bottom two: Rebecka Skiöld-Nielsen & Victoria Eriksson
- Eliminated: Victoria Eriksson

=== Episode 7 ===
Original Air Date: March 13, 2012

- First call-out: Klara Kassman
- Bottom two: Alice Herbst & Sibel Kara
- Eliminated: Sibel Kara

=== Episode 8 ===
Original Air Date: March 20, 2012

- First call-out: Alice Herbst
- Bottom two: Klara Kassman & Nina Strauss
- Eliminated: Nina Strauss
- Special guests: Chris Carmack, Josh Otten, Mini Andén

=== Episode 9 ===
Original Air Date: March 27, 2012

- First call-out: Alice Herbst
- Bottom two: Klara Kassman & Rebecka Skiöld-Nielsen
- Eliminated: Rebecka Skiöld-Nielsen

=== Episode 10 ===
Original Air Date: April 3, 2012

This episode was the recap episode, where highlights and never before seen scenes were shown.

=== Episode 11 ===
Original Air Date: April 10, 2012

- Final two: Alice Herbst & Klara Kassman
- Top Model Sverige: Alice Herbst

== Summaries ==
=== Call-out order ===
Order	Episodes									
Order	1	2	3	4	5	6	7	8	9	11
1	Jenny	Jamilla	Jenny	Victoria	Alice; Klara; Nina; Rebecka; Sibel	Sibel	Klara	Alice	Alice	Alice
2	Linnéa	Klara	Klara	Rebecka	Alice; Klara; Nina; Rebecka; Sibel	Klara	Nina	Rebecka	Klara	Klara
3	Alice	Sibel	Alice	Jenny	Alice; Klara; Nina; Rebecka; Sibel	Nina	Rebecka	Klara	Rebecka	
4	Jamilla	Nina	Rebecka	Nina	Alice; Klara; Nina; Rebecka; Sibel	Alice	Alice	Nina		
5	Ivana	Jenny	Jamilla	Alice	Alice; Klara; Nina; Rebecka; Sibel	Rebecka	Sibel			
6	Victoria	Alice	Nina	Sibel	Victoria	Victoria				
7	Klara	Sophie	Victoria	Klara	Jenny					
8	Sophie	Victoria	Sibel	Jamilla						
9	Nina	Rebecka	Sophie							
10	Sibel	Ivana								
11		Linnéa								

The contestant was eliminated outside of judging panel
The contestant was put through collectively to the next round
The contestant was eliminated
The contestant won the competition

- In Episode 2, Linnéa was eliminated after a photo challenge at LAX. Later, Rebecka joined the cast as a wild-card contestant.
- In Episode 5, only the bottom two were called forward, putting the other contestants through without a call-out order.
- Episode 10 is the recap episode.

=== Photo Shoot Guide ===
- Episode 2 Photoshoots: LAX Challenge / Celebrities on Hollywood Walk of Fame
- Episode 3 Photoshoot: Sexy Spies for Maybelline New York
- Episode 4 Photoshoot: Zombies in Morgue
- Episode 5 Photoshoot: Nude Mermaids
- Episode 6 Photoshoot: Mojave Desert with Animals
- Episode 7 Photoshoot: Lars Wallin Gowns on Beach
- Episode 8 Photoshoot: Chic Moms w/ a Toddler for Mercedes-Benz
- Episode 9 Photoshoot: Body Paint for Reebok EasyTone
- Episode 11 Photoshoot: Elle Cover
