= Chika Ike =

Nigerian actress (born 1985)

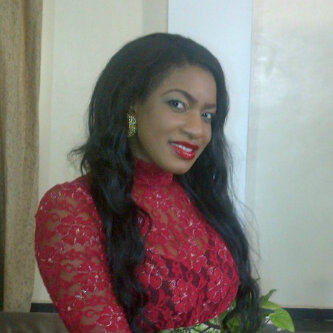
- Chika Ike
- Born: Chika Nancy Ike; 8 November 1985 (age 41); Onitsha, Anambra, Nigeria
- Education: Human Kinetics and Health Education, University of Lagos
- Occupations: Actress, model, television personality, producer, businesswoman and philanthropist
- Years active: 2005—present
- Awards: African Heritage Awards, 2012

Chika Nancy Ike (born 8 November 1985)// is a Nigerian actress, television personality, producer, businesswoman, philanthropist and former model.

== Early life and education ==
Ike was born in Onitsha, Anambra state, located in the southeastern region of Nigeria. She began acting in church plays at the age of six. Ike began modelling at age 16 after finishing secondary school. She started business at age 17. In 2004, Ike completed a two-year diploma programme in Human Kinetics and Health Education, followed by a degree in this subject from University of Lagos.

In 2014, Ike graduated from the New York Film Academy in Los Angeles, California where she studied film-making. She founded her production company, Chika Ike Production, the same year.

She was admitted into the Executive MBA Programme in Harvard University in 2017.

== Film and television career ==
Ike began her film career in 2005 when she appeared a minor character in the movie Sweet Love. She was cast in her first major role that same year in the film Bless the Child. She has since played major roles in over a hundred movies, such as Paradise, Mirror of Beauty, To Love a Stranger, Girls Got Reloaded, Happy Ending, Yes We Will, Anointed Queen and The Prince and the Princess.

In 2007, Mirror of Beauty was shown in Cineworld and Odeon cinemas across the U.K and in 2008 was selected and screened at the Cannes film festival.

In 2014, her production company, Chika Ike Production, produced the movie Miss Teacher. The same year, Ike served as executive producer on the reality TV game show African Diva Reality TV Show. She also acted as host and member of the judgement panel on the show. The first season aired on DStv and the second season aired on AIT. In 2015, she collaborated with Rok Studios to produce the movies Happy Ending and Stuck on You.

== Real estate business ==
In 2023, Ike invested in real estate and created a housing project called The Maison. The housing project was designed to provide affordable home ownership housing through duplexes and apartment complexes.

== Published works ==
Ike published her debut book Boss Up in 2018. The book was endorsed by the Harvard Business School.

== Philanthropy ==
Ike established the foundation Help the Child, which is aimed at helping poor children. In 2012, she hosted a street party to benefit more than 3000 children by feeding them and giving out toys, school bags and writing materials. Ike maintains the event yearly to provide children with scholarships and school writing materials.

== Fashion career ==
In 2011, Ike founded her fashion line Fancy Nancy and launched it in Abuja, Nigeria.

== Personal life ==
Ike has been outspoken on abusive relationships, having been a victim of domestic violence. In 2013, she discussed her experience with domestic abuse in her previous marriage. She filed for divorce in 2013 after seven years of marriage. In March 2025, Ike gave birth to a baby girl.

== Awards and nominations ==
Ike has received several awards and nominations for her work, including the Africa Movie Academy Awards Best Upcoming Actress, 2008, and the Africa Movie Academy Award for Best Actress in a Supporting Role in 2009 for her performance in the movie The Assassin.

Year	Event	Prize	Recipient	Result	Ref
2008	Africa Movie Academy Awards	Best Upcoming Actress	Bless the Child	Nominated	
2009	Africa Movie Academy Awards	Best Supporting Actress	Assassination	Nominated	
2009	African Youth Society Award	Best Role Model in Africa	Self	Won	
2009	City People Entertainment Awards	Best Supporting Actress	Self	Nominated	
2011	Donven Club Awards	Best Actress	Self	Won	
2011	United Nations Messenger of Peace	United Nations Youth Ambassador for Peace	Self	Honorary	
2012	African Heritage Awards	Contributions to The Youth In Africa	Self	Won	
2013	HOG Award	Icon of Hope	Self	Won	
2013	Actors Guild of Nigeria (AGN) Award	Most Disciplined Actress	Self	Won	
2013	Cynosure Magazine Nigerian Fashion Recognition Awards	Nollywood Fashion Icon of the Year	Self	Won	
2016	City People Entertainment Awards	Face of Nollywood	Self	Nominated	
2016	ZAFFA Awards	Best Producer	Miss Teacher	Nominated	
2016	ZAFFA Awards	Best Actress	Miss Teacher	Nominated	
2018	ZAFFA Awards	Best Actress		Nominated	
2020	International Film Festival Award	Best Actress	Self	Won	
2020	International Film Festival Award	Best Production	Small Chops	Won	
2020	International Film Festival Award	Best Sound design	Small Chops	Won	
2020	International Film Festival Award	Best Supporting Actress	Self	Won	
2020	International Film Festival Award	Best Director	Self	Won	

== Filmography ==
Year	Film	Role	Notes
2023	Domino Effect	Chinwe	Directed by Freddie George
2020	Small Chops	Nikita	Drama
2017	Dark Past		Thriller
2016	Happy Ending	Lape	Drama, Romance
2016	Locked up	Susan	Drama, Romance
2015	Miss Teacher	Nwanne	Drama, Romance
2015	Mission to Love	Stella	
2014	Secret Act	Zeena	Directed by Nonso Emekaekwue
2013	My Diva	Nina	
2012	Bridge of Contract		Directed by Ugezu J. Ugezu
2012	The End is Near		with Yul Edochie
2012	A Minute Silence	Amarachi	
2011	White Chapel	Yvonne	Directed by Okey-Zubelu Okoh
2010	Street President	Nene	
2009	Dangerous Beauty	Anita	
2009	Eyes of the Nun		
2009	Harvest of Love	Nancy	
2008	Before The Rain	Anita	Alongside Tonto Dikeh, Desmond Elliot
2008	Desire	Juliet	
2008	Jealous Princess	Mercy	Alongside Van Vicker, Oge Okoye
2007	Power of Beauty	Chioma	
2006	My Only Girl	Stephine	I & II
2006	Love Wins	Emily	
2005	One God One Nation	Eunice	Directed by Reginald Ebere
2004	Standing Alone	Halima	Drama
