= African Diva =

2015 Nigerian TV series

- Created by: Chika Ike
- Presented by: Chika Ike
- Judges: Chika Ike; Daniel Osabohen Micheal-Akhere (3); Jennifer Onyeanu (3); Stanley Morgan (2); Jane Obi (2)
- Country of origin: Nigeria
- Original language: English
- No. of seasons: 3
- No. of episodes: 52

Production
- Running time: 60 minutes (1); 30 minutes (2-3)

Original release
- Network: irokotv (Season 1); Africa Independent Television (Season 2); Galaxy Television (Season 3); Crystal TV Ghana (Season 3)
- Release: 18 April 2015 – 5 January 2019

African Diva Reality TV Show (abbreviated ADRS) is an African series and interactive competition.

The series is a reality, docu-drama that focuses on the search for the ideal African woman. Women from all over the nation will get a chance to compete for the privilege of being called an African Diva. The reality series will be centered on Nigeria's own superstar Chika Ike.

The show will be internally judged by Chika Ike and a panel of judges that will be both regulars and guest stars. There will be 22 contestants that will begin the show, They will be transported to an undisclosed location.

== Format ==
Each cycle of African Diva will air in 13 weeks and starts with 22 contestants. The competition will span over the course of 4 weeks. Each day, the girls will compete in a task. The tasks will judge the girls on their domestic skills, hospitality, entrepreneurship, sports, child-care and their knowledge of Africa. At the end of each task, the contestants will be assessed, there will be winners and losers, and every episode will see the eviction of at least one of the contestants.

Each contestants will receive a bowl made of Calabash that represent their DIVA (Determination, Insistent, Vivacious, Admired by all). If the contestant got evicted, they have to return the calabash and leave the show.

The contestants will be winnowed down till only the 3 finalists remain in the house and a winner will emerge.

== Cycles ==
Cycle	Premiere date	Winner	Runner-up	Other contestants in order of elimination	Number of contestants
1	18 April 2015	Love Egbule	Bolaji Ogunmola	Mark, Charity, Ifebuche, Nora, Mary Ann, Lydian John, Elizabeth, Anita Ofuzor, Jenifer, Chinenye, Adaeze, Olivia Sandra, Folashade, Stephanie, Olufemi, Amaka Madu, Omowunmi Wanyonyi, Brigid, Eniola, Vanessa	22
2	16 October 2016	(Nigeria); Ebony Obasuyi	(Togo); Beatrice Alovor	Rita & Tatiana, Raffayatu, Osas Osamende & Priscilla & Sayi, Ifunaya & Pearl Akpetey, Abissola, Francis, Joy Lawan, Cynthia, Chinelo Nwoye, Orhlah, Maries Stella, Aicha, Jumoke, Stephanie, Kitcha, Josphine	22
3	13 October 2018	(Guinea); Jasmine Sidibe	(Nigeria); Love Nebo	Bukola Rosemary & Dairo Roseline & Mercy Ogbe, Chioma Nwafor (DQ), Bernace Hounake & Hope Agbor & Treasure Ushere, Chika Agamez, Precious Abdulrahman & Florencia Suka, Joyce Ruby & Julia Godwin, Madonna Rosella & Philomena McCarthy & Ruth Samura, Kenny Aladeta, Mellisa Osagie, Oluchi Alozie, Lynn Muia, Diane Yashime	22

== Season 1 ==
The prize package for this season included a one-year acting contract with Chika Ike Production, a cover feature and an editorial spread in Vergeria Life Magazine, a one-year supply of accessories from Fancy Nancy Collections, and a cash prize of ₦4,000,000.

=== Contestants ===
Contestant
Charity
Ifebuche
Nora
Elizabeth
Anita Ofuzor
Adaeze
Olivia Sandra
Olufemi
Amaka Madu
Omowunmi Wanyonyi
Eniola
Vanessa
Folashade
Mary Ann
Jenifer
Chinenye
Brigid
Stephanie
Mark
Lydian John
Bolaji Ogunmola
Love Egbule

== Season 2 ==
The prize package for this season included a one-year acting contract with Chika Ike Production, a cover feature and an editorial spread in Vergeria Life Magazine, a one-year supply of accessories from Fancy Nancy Collections, a cash prize of US$10,000, and a brand new car.

=== Contestants ===
(Ages stated are at start of contest)

Country	Contestant	Age	Finish	Place
Nigeria	Rita	28	Episode 8	22-21
Ivory Coast	Tatiana	32	Episode 8	22-21
Nigeria	Raffayatu	27	Episode 9	20
Benin	Sayi	33	Episode 10	19-17
Nigeria	Osas Osamende	26	Episode 10	19-17
Ghana	Priscilla	22	Episode 10	19-17
Ghana	Pearl Cindy Akpetey	19	Episode 11	16-15
Nigeria	Ifunaya	23	Episode 11	16-15
Nigeria	Abissola	26	Episode 12	14
Nigeria	Francis	25	Episode 13	13
Nigeria	Joy Lawan	28	Episode 15	12
Nigeria	Cynthia	22	Episode 16	11
Nigeria	Amanda Chinelo Nwoye	22	Episode 17	10
Togo	Orhlah	19	Episode 18	9
Nigeria	Maries Stella	22	Episode 19	8
Ivory Coast	Aicha	28	Episode 20	7
Nigeria	Jumoke	23	Episode 21	6
Nigeria	Stephanie	23	Episode 22	5
Togo	Florence Kitcha	24	Episode 24	4
Ghana	Josphine	28	Episode 25	3
Togo	Ama Beatrice Alovor	34	Episode 25	2
Nigeria	Ebony Obasuyi	28	Episode 25	1

=== Results table ===
Place	Contestant	Episodes																	
Place	Contestant	7	8	9	10	11	12	13	14	15	16	17	18	19	20	21	22	24	25
1	Ebony	SAFE	SAFE	LOW	LOW	LOW	SAFE	SAFE	SAFE	HIGH	HIGH	SAFE	SAFE	SAFE	SAFE	SAFE	SAFE	LOW	WIN
2	Beatrice	HIGH	SAFE	SAFE	SAFE	SAFE	SAFE	SAFE	LOW	SAFE	SAFE	HIGH	HIGH	SAFE	SAFE	SAFE	LOW	LOW	OUT
3	Josphine	SAFE	SAFE	SAFE	SAFE	SAFE	LOW	SAFE	SAFE	SAFE	SAFE	SAFE	LOW	LOW	SAFE	LOW	HIGH	HIGH	OUT
4	Kitcha	SAFE	SAFE	SAFE	SAFE	HIGH	SAFE	SAFE	LOW	SAFE	SAFE	LOW	SAFE	SAFE	LOW	HIGH	SAFE	OUT	
5	Stephanie	SAFE	SAFE	SAFE	SAFE	SAFE	SAFE	SAFE	SAFE	SAFE	SAFE	SAFE	SAFE	SAFE	HIGH	SAFE	OUT		
6	Jumoke	SAFE	SAFE	SAFE	SAFE	SAFE	SAFE	SAFE	HIGH	SAFE	SAFE	LOW	LOW	SAFE	SAFE	OUT			
7	Aicha	SAFE	SAFE	SAFE	LOW	SAFE	SAFE	SAFE	SAFE	LOW	SAFE	SAFE	SAFE	HIGH	OUT				
8	Maries	SAFE	HIGH	SAFE	SAFE	LOW	SAFE	SAFE	SAFE	SAFE	SAFE	SAFE	SAFE	OUT					
9	Orhlah	SAFE	SAFE	HIGH	SAFE	SAFE	SAFE	HIGH	SAFE	SAFE	SAFE	SAFE	OUT						
10	Chinelo	SAFE	SAFE	LOW	HIGH	SAFE	SAFE	SAFE	SAFE	SAFE	LOW	OUT							
11	Cynthia	SAFE	SAFE	SAFE	LOW	SAFE	HIGH	LOW	SAFE	SAFE	OUT								
12	Joy	LOW	SAFE	SAFE	SAFE	SAFE	SAFE	SAFE	SAFE	OUT									
13	Francis	SAFE	SAFE	SAFE	SAFE	SAFE	LOW	OUT											
14	Abissola	SAFE	LOW	SAFE	SAFE	LOW	OUT												
16-15	Ifunaya	SAFE	SAFE	SAFE	LOW	OUT													
16-15	Pearl	SAFE	SAFE	SAFE	SAFE	OUT													
19-17	Priscilla	SAFE	SAFE	SAFE	OUT														
19-17	Osas	SAFE	SAFE	SAFE	OUT														
19-17	Sayi	SAFE	SAFE	SAFE	OUT														
20	Raffayatu	SAFE	SAFE	OUT															
22-21	Rita	LOW	OUT																
22-21	Tatiana	SAFE	OUT																

The contestant won the task
The contestant was in danger of elimination
The contestant was eliminated
The contestant won the competition

=== Episodes ===
No. in season	Title	Original release date
1	"Audition - Nigeria"	16 October 2016
2	"Audition - Togo, Ghana, Côte d'Ivoire and Benin"	17 August 2016
3	"Invited And Not Invited"	23 October 2016
4	"One On One"	24 October 2016
5	"Who Makes The Cut"	30 October 2016
6	"Meet The Contestants"	31 October 2016
7	"We Are Africans"	6 November 2016
8	"Lets Be Fit"	7 November 2016
9	"Mother's Love"	13 November 2016
10	"Arts And Craft"	14 November 2016
11	"Let's Do Good"	20 November 2016
12	"Lets Dance"	21 November 2016
13	"Do It Yourself"	27 November 2016
14	"Character Test"	28 November 2016
15	"Home Maker"	4 December 2016
16	"Be That Character"	5 December 2016
17	"Let Learn Etiquette"	11 December 2016
18	"Own That Look"	12 December 2016
19	"Social Media And The Public Opinion"	18 December 2016
20	"Brands And Commodities"	19 December 2016
21	"Be My Date"	25 December 2016
22	"Lets Create A Chance"	26 December 2016
23	"Meet The Girls"	1 January 2017
24	"Lending A Voice"	2 January 2017
25	"Finale"	8 January 2017
26	"Highlights And Never Before Seen"	9 January 2017

== Season 3 ==
The prize package for this season included a one-year acting contract with Chika Ike Production, a cover feature and an editorial spread in Vergeria Life Magazine, and a cash prize of ₦2,000,000.

=== Contestants ===
(Ages stated are at start of contest)

Country	Contestant	Age	Finish	Place
Nigeria	Bukola Rosemary	24	Episode 2	22-20
Nigeria	Dairo Roseline	22	Episode 2	22-20
Nigeria	Iniye Mercy Ogbe		Episode 2	22-20
Nigeria	Chioma Nwafor		Episode 3	19 (DQ)
Togo	Bernace Hounake		Episode 3	18-16
Nigeria	Hope Agbor	22	Episode 3	18-16
Nigeria	Treasure Ushere		Episode 3	18-16
Nigeria	Chika Ruth Agamez		Episode 4	15
Nigeria	Precious Abdulrahman		Episode 5	14-13
Ghana	Florencia Eyonam Suka		Episode 5	14-13
Nigeria	Joyce Ruby		Episode 7	12-11
Nigeria	Julia Godwin		Episode 7	12-11
Cameroon	Arrey Madonna Rosella		Episode 8	10-8
Liberia	Philomena McCarthy		Episode 8	10-8
Sierra Leone	Ruth Samura	27	Episode 8	10-8
Nigeria	Kenny Aladeta		Episode 9	7
Nigeria	Mellisa Osagie		Episode 10	6
Nigeria	Oluchi Alozie		Episode 11	5
Kenya	Lynn Muia		Episode 12	4
Nigeria	Precious Diane Yashime	22	Episode 13	3
Nigeria	Love Ife Nebo		Episode 13	2
Guinea	Jasmine Sjöberg Sidibe	26	Episode 13	1

=== Results table ===
Place	Contestant	Episodes											
Place	Contestant	2	3 (Note: In episode 3, Chioma was disqualified before the result because the judges suspected her of suffering an injury.)	4	5	6	7	8	9	10	11	12	13
1	Jasmine	SAFE	SAFE	SAFE	LOW	HIGH	SAFE	SAFE	HIGH	HIGH	SAFE	SAFE	WIN
2	Love	SAFE	SAFE	HIGH	HIGH	SAFE	SAFE	LOW	LOW	SAFE	SAFE	LOW	OUT
3	Diane	SAFE	SAFE	SAFE	SAFE	SAFE	HIGH	LOW	SAFE	SAFE	HIGH	SAFE	OUT
4	Lynn	SAFE	HIGH	SAFE	SAFE	SAFE	SAFE	LOW	SAFE	LOW	LOW	OUT	
5	Oluchi	HIGH	SAFE	SAFE	SAFE	SAFE	LOW	SAFE	SAFE	SAFE	OUT		
6	Mellisa	SAFE	SAFE	LOW	LOW	SAFE	LOW	SAFE	LOW	OUT			
7	Kenny	SAFE	SAFE	SAFE	SAFE	SAFE	SAFE	HIGH	OUT				
10-8	Ruth	SAFE	SAFE	SAFE	SAFE	LOW	SAFE	OUT					
10-8	Philomena	SAFE	SAFE	SAFE	SAFE	SAFE	SAFE	OUT					
10-8	Madonna	SAFE	SAFE	SAFE	SAFE	SAFE	SAFE	OUT					
12-11	Julia	SAFE	SAFE	SAFE	SAFE	LOW	OUT						
12-11	Joyce	SAFE	SAFE	SAFE	SAFE	SAFE	OUT						
14-13	Florencia	SAFE	SAFE	SAFE	OUT								
14-13	Precious	SAFE	SAFE	SAFE	OUT								
15	Chika	SAFE	SAFE	OUT									
18-16	Bernace	SAFE	OUT										
18-16	Hope	SAFE	OUT										
18-16	Treasure	SAFE	OUT										
19	Chioma	SAFE	DQ										
22-20	Dairo	OUT											
22-20	Mercy	OUT											
22-20	Bukola	OUT											

The contestant won the task
The contestant was in danger of elimination
The contestant was disqualified from the competition
The contestant was eliminated
The contestant won the competition
