= Allt om Mat =

Swedish gastronomical magazine

- Editor-in-Chief: Suzanne Ribbing
- Categories: Food and drink magazine
- First issue: 5 October 1970; 54 years ago
- Company: Bonnier Group
- Country: Sweden
- Based in: Stockholm
- Language: Swedish
- Website: alltommat.expressen.se

Allt om Mat ("Everything about food") is a Swedish gastronomical magazine, published by Bonnier Magazines & Brands. Based in Stockholm, the magazine was launched in 1970. It is the first food magazine in the Swedish magazine market. The number of issues per year ranges from 5 to 20. The magazine was integrated into the website of the Expressen newspaper along with other Bonnier magazines such as Damernas Värld and Sköna hem in May 2021.

The number of Allt om Mat readers was 441,000 in the first quarter of 2014.
