= Sköna hem =

Interior design magazine in Sweden

- Editor-in-chief: Claes Blom
- Categories: Interior design magazine
- Frequency: Monthly
- Publisher: Bonniers Tidskrifter AB
- Founded: 1979
- Company: Bonnier Group
- Country: Sweden
- Based in: Stockholm
- Language: Swedish
- Website: skonahem.se
- ISSN: 0348-551X
- OCLC: 482267202

Sköna hem (Swedish: Beautiful home) is an interior design magazine which has been published since 1979 in Stockholm, Sweden. It is one of the magazines owned by Bonnier Group and is the oldest interior design magazine in the country.

== History and profile ==
Sköna hem was established in 1979 with the subtitle of Inredning, konst, kultur, antikviteter (Swedish: Interior design, art, culture, antiques). The Specialtidningsförlaget was its founding company. From 1982 to 1988 the magazine was published by Åhlén & Åkerlund. A company called Sköna hem was the publisher of the magazine between 1988 and 1992.

The magazine is published by Bonniers Tidskrifter AB fourteen times a year. Its headquarters is in Stockholm, and Claes Blom is the editor-in-chief. Sköne hem targets readers aged between 25 and 45. As of 2010, 75% of its readers were women and 25% men. It covers articles on interior design and also offers buying tips to help its readers create beautiful homes. It organizes courses on interior design in some cities of Sweden. In May 2021 the magazine was integrated into the website of the Expressen newspaper along with other Bonnier magazines such as Damernas Värld and Allt om Mat.

Sköna hem sold 92,600 copies in 2008, and the number of its readers was 430,000 the same year. The magazine had 409,000 readers in 2011.
