= Elsa Hosk =

Swedish-Finnish fashion model (born 1988)

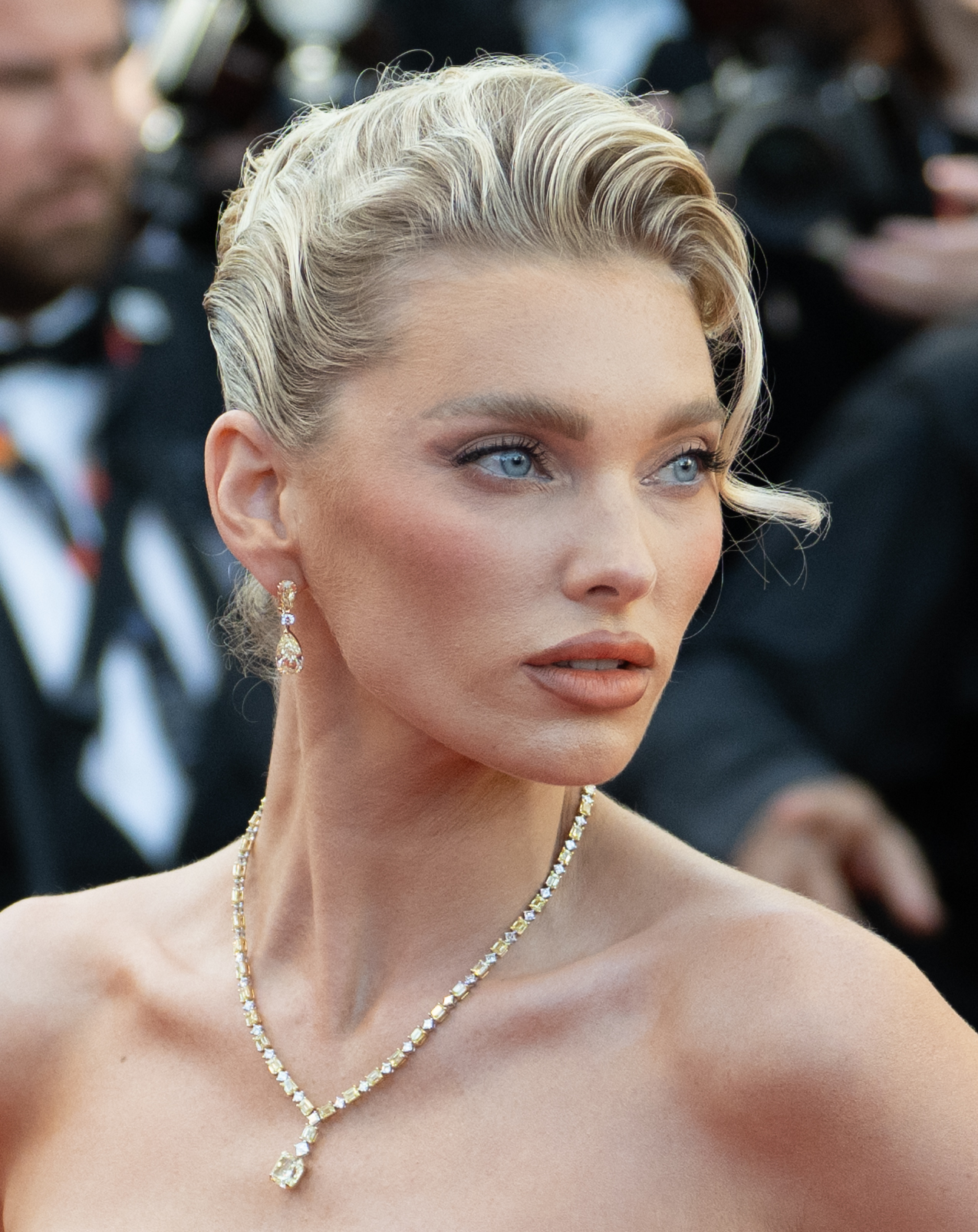
- Hosk in 2025
- Born: Elsa Anna Sofie Hosk; 7 November 1988 (age 38); Stockholm, Sweden
- Occupations: Model; basketball player
- Years active: 2001−present
- Partner: Tom Daly (2015–present)
- Children: 2
- Modeling information
- Height: 5 ft 9 in (1.76 m)
- Hair color: Blonde
- Eye color: Blue
- Agency: IMG Models (worldwide); View Management (Barcelona); MIKAS (Stockholm, Los Angeles)
- Website: https://elsahosk.com/

Elsa Anna Sofie Hosk (born 7 November 1988) is a Swedish-Finnish fashion model. She has worked for brands including Dior, Dolce & Gabbana, Ungaro, H&M, Anna Sui, Lilly Pulitzer and Guess. She modeled for Victoria's Secret, appearing in the brand's annual fashion show from 2011 to 2018. Hosk has also appeared in many of the brand's campaigns, especially for the sub-division PINK. In 2015, she was announced as one of 10 new Victoria's Secret Angels. She has also played professional basketball in Sweden.

== Career ==
Hosk was born in Stockholm on 7 November 1988 in Stockholm. Growing up in Sweden, Hosk was presented with offers to model during high school after her father submitted photographs to various modeling agencies in Sweden when she was 13; she began modeling at 14. She did some modeling in high school but decided to primarily concentrate on her studies instead (she did some notable work with Guess and other companies however). After graduating, she decided to pursue a career in the Swedish women's basketball league. Hosk has commented that the level of play in the Swedish professional basketball league was not on par with the WNBA, and that interest in the sport was not as great in Sweden as in the United States. Although she ultimately abandoned professional basketball for modeling, Hosk has said that the intense rigor of practices (8 per week when playing basketball) and travel helped prepare her for the physical and travel demands of the modeling world.

After playing professional basketball for two years, she began receiving many job offers and soon moved to New York City to begin modeling full-time. Some writers have speculated that her work with Victoria's Secret was what brought her into the top tier fashion world, but Hosk also identifies her work with photographer Ellen von Unwerth in campaigns for Guess.

She is ranked 15th on the Top Sexiest Models list by models.com. She opened the Victoria's Secret Fashion Show in 2016 and wore the Swarovski outfit in 2017. She was chosen to wear the "Dream Angels" Fantasy Bra in the 2018 Victoria's Secret Fashion Show held in New York City on 8 November 2018. The bra, worth US$1 million, was designed by Atelier Swarovski and hand-set with 2,100 Swarovski created diamonds. She has walked for designers like Versace, Dior, Jean Paul Gaultier, YSL, Balmain, Moschino, Calvin Klein, Isabel Marant, Brandon Maxwell, LaQuan Smith, Valentino, Michael Kors, Miu Miu, Alberta Ferretti, Blumarine, Max Mara, Dolce&Gabbana, Escada, Etro, Carolina Herrera, and Jeremy Scott.

== Personal life ==
Hosk is the daughter of Swedish father Pål and Finnish mother Marja. She has two brothers. Her cousin, Alice Herbst, is also a model. Herbst won the televised competition of Sweden's Next Top Model in 2012.

Hosk has worked to support the anti-human trafficking organization, FAIR Girls. She became interested in the issue after seeing the movie The Whistleblower, which dealt with issues of sex trafficking.

Though the media often notes her physical resemblance and nominal correlation to Queen Elsa from Disney's 2013 film Frozen, she denies any connection to the character or the Frozen franchise.

Since early 2015, Hosk has been in a relationship with Tom Daly, the Danish cofounder and creative director of holistic eyewear company District Vision. Their daughter was born on 11 February 2021. The couple became engaged in September 2025. In April 2026, Hosk announced that they are expecting another child. On 22 July, Hosk gave birth to their second daughter.

== Filmography ==
Film and television
Year	Title	Role	Notes
2011–18, 2026	Victoria's Secret Fashion Show	Herself	Model; Television special
2017	And the Winner Isn't	Herself	Documentary film
2019	Burning Bright	Slim	Short film
2023	Germany's Next Topmodel	Herself	Guest Judge; Season 18

Music videos
Year	Title	Artist
2006	"Who's That Girl"	
2017	"2U" feat. Justin Bieber (Victoria's Secret Version)	David Guetta
