= Miss Model of the World =

International modeling contest

- Formation: 1988; 38 years ago
- Type: Beauty pageant
- Headquarters: Shenzhen
- Location: China
- Official language: English
- President: Chzhui Anna (from 2021)
- Website: www.world-missmodel.com

Miss Model of the World is an international model contest organized for the first time in Istanbul, Turkey in 1988 with 42 countries participating.

== Recent titleholders ==
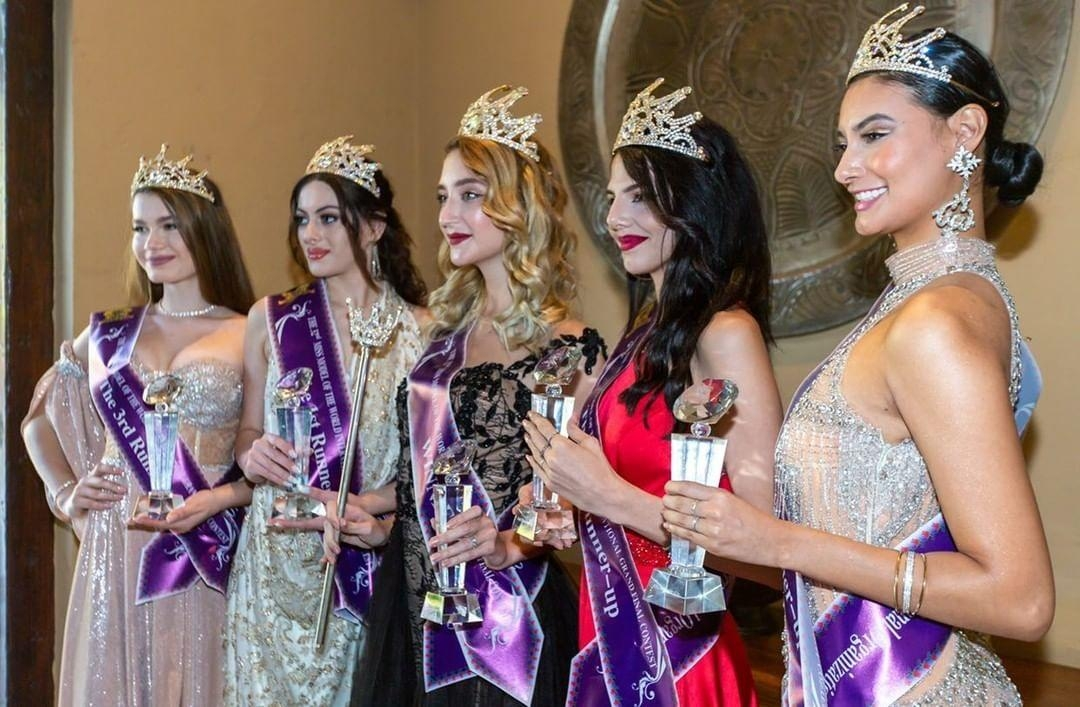
Winner and recent titles holders of the 32nd Miss Model of the World 2022 (Dubai, UAE).

Year	Country	Miss Model of the World	Host city	Entrants
2025	Chad	Fatime Rahama	Shenzhen, China	33
2022	Belarus	Angelika Kuzmenok	Dubai, UAE	60
No pageant held in 2020-2021 due to the COVID-19 pandemic
2019	Russia	Anastasilla Ushakova	Shenzhen, China	70
2018	Turkey	Pınar Tartan	Shenzhen, China	70
2017	Ukraine	Liliia Halushko	Shenzhen, China	60
2016	Finland	Anna Merimaa	Shenzhen, China	70
2015	Côte d'Ivoire	Awa Geremaya Sanoko	Shenzhen, China	115
2014	United States	Shelynne Paige Hoyt	Shenzhen, China	61
2013	Tatarstan	Margarita Pavlushin	Shenzhen, China	51
2012	Russia	Khrystyna Oparina	Shenzhen, China	58
2011	Turkey	Sevcan Yasar	Shenzhen, China	66
2010	United States	Amanda Renee Delgado	Shenzhen, China	65
2009	France	Eméné Alexandra Nyame	Shenzhen, China	66
2008	Ukraine	Mariya Lakimuk	Buenos Aires, Argentina	63
2007	Czech Republic	Iveta Lutovska	Yuncheng, China	57
2006	China	May Di Song	Shenzhen, China	56
2005	Lebanon	Catherine Hamzeh Abboud	Shenzhen, China	71
2004	Trinidad and Tobago	Aqiyla Gomez	Hangzhou, China	59
2003	China	Yan Wei	Istanbul, Turkey	40
2002	Brazil	Gislaine Ferreira	Ulaanbaatar, Mongolia	28
2001	Finland	Laura Keränen	Istanbul, Turkey	32
2000	Poland	Małgorzata Rożniecka	Istanbul, Turkey	43
1999	United Kingdom	Michelle Walker	Antalya, Turkey	40
1998	United Kingdom	Abby Essien	Istanbul, Turkey	40
1997	France	Caroline Lubrez	Istanbul, Turkey	42
1996	Cuba	Carla Paneca Fernández	Antalya, Turkey	41
1995	Cuba	Laura Marlén Cabbera	Antalya, Turkey	40
1994	France	Isabelle da Silva	Istanbul, Turkey	38
1993	Philippines	Gemith Gonzalo Gemparo	Paris, France	37
1992	France	Céline Cassagnes	Turku, Finland	37
1991	Australia	Helena Wayth	Rome, Italy	35
1990	Venezuela	Sharon Luengo	Taipei, Taiwan	41
1989	France	Kao Ardon	Istanbul, Turkey	34
1988	Colombia	Victoria Eugenia Azuero	Istanbul, Turkey	38

== List of runners-up Miss Model of the World ==
Year	1st Runner-up	2nd Runner-up	3rd Runner-up	4th Runner-up
1988	Helena Kirsi; Finland	Sibel Tan; Turkey	Geraldine Cho; Singapore	Victoria Zangaro; Uruguay
1989	Marisabel Valdes; Venezuela	Aneta Rusewitz; Sweden	Anitha Das; Malaysia	Rachael Patrick; United Kingdom
1990	Nany Naegele; United States	Eva Pedraza; Spain	not awarded	not awarded
1991	Helena Wayth; Australia	Anne-Marie Poggi; France	not awarded	not awarded
1992	Meike Swartz; Germany	Sonia Bermudez; Colombia	not awarded	not awarded
1993	Natalia Martinez; Venezuela	Dimitri Kostaki; Greece	Dorota Wróbel; Poland	Olga Berina; Russia
1994	Irini Alexiou; Greece	Alexandra Koukoulyk; Russia	Yekaterina Sharapova; Kazakhstan	Maja Lupesco; Israel
1995	Tugba Ozay; Turkey	Jakki Denell Aherne; Australia	not awarded	not awarded
1996	Mercedes Mwajas; Hungary	Yenni Vaca Paz; Bolivia	Nataliya Nadtochey; Ukraine	Rosita Wahab; Malaysia
1997	Mari Carmen; Spain	Assel Issabayeva; Kazakhstan	not awarded	not awarded
1998	Woon Yeow; Singapore	Veronica Laskaeva; Uzbekistan	not awarded	not awarded
1999	Rosana Pelaz; Spain	Thanyaluk Worapimrat; Thailand	not awarded	not awarded
2000	Alexandra Aguilera; Spain	Feza Gursoy; Turkey	Tanja Weltach; Austria	Joan Chópite; Venezuela
2001	Ksenia Saifutdinova; Russia	Oksana Dahan; Israel	Oksana Shirokova; Kyrgyzstan	Pescador Sánchez; Spain
2002	Marta Gracia; Spain	Dimitra Alexandraki; Greece	Renata Janecková; Czech Republic	Karelit Vanessa Yépez; Venezuela
2003	Gislaine Ferreira; Brazil	Miyako Miyazaki; Japan	Florecita de Jesús Cobián Azurdia; Guatemala	not awarded
2004	Ma Li; China	Ling Zhang; Hong Kong	Ana Leticia Fernández; Spain	Ljiljana Savovic; Bosnia and Herzegovina
2005	Chien-An Lin; Taiwan	Elena Tihomirova; Bulgaria	Julia Liptakova; Slovak Republic	Julia Nikolevna Tjulinova; Estonia
2006	Eleonora Masalab; Ukraine	Ana Maria Ortiz Rodal; Bolivia	Yan Fei Pan; Hong Kong	Sofija Pelivanova; Macedonia
2007	Stephanie Thomas; Trinidad and Tobago	Ria Antoniou; Greece	Katherine Meyer; Peru	Yuliya Mazurets; Turkmenistan
2008	Hommy King; China	Serap Tunç; Turkey	Pavlina Kostagiou; Greece	Aelita Azhybekova; Kazakhstan
2009	Deyra Cimen; Turkey	Yuliya Galichenko; Ukraine	Edelyn Victoriana Cedeño; Dominican Republic	Lan Huong Ngoc Nguyen; Vietnam
2010	Ema Masters; Australia	Qing Qing Cao; China	Carolaine Peroza; Venezuela	Nina Astrakhantseva; Crimea
2011	Ivett Bozhar; Hungary	Sara Jasmine Mamadama; Guinea	Li Meng; China	Michaela Dihlova; Czech Republic
2012	Pomitun Anzhelika; Ukraine	Kamaci Gelincik; Germany	Martina Stupakova; Slovakia	Alexandra Todorova; Bulgaria
2013	Margaret Baa; Ghana	Tetiana Khoroshaya; Crimea	Lavinia Muscan; Romania	Qi Rui; China
2014	Anastasiya Sukh; Ukraine	Natalya Tytko; Russia	Lyubov Aristova; Abkhazia	Jessica Eveline Wistopo; Indonesia
2015	Sune Botes; South Africa	Sarka Mohorkova; Czech Republic	Nadezda Bychkova; Russia	Tanisha Demour; Malaysia
2016	Janet Leyva; Peru	Dai Ying; China	Pilar Macro Morales; Spain	Emilia Dobrayeva; Siberia
2017	Angela Goretti Robles; Mexico	Angelina Chmel; Tatarstan	Sophia Sergio; Italy	Marylin Saldaña; Peru
2018	Sarah Touré Kanika; Democratic Republic of the Congo	Gabriela Marisol Acosta Martínez; Uruguay	Magdalena Wesołowska; Poland	Qi Yanchang; China
2019	Liliia Lakishek; Ukraine	Yang Yanwen; China	Elizaveta Kataeva; Siberia	Angélica Hernández; Mexico
2022	Mariam Managadze; Georgia	Nadia Carrieri; Italy	Marharyta Knutova; Ukraine	Teresita Bridge Sanchez Anez; Bolivia
2025	Natalia Ivanova; Russia	Rosa Hernandez Uran; Colombia	Anne Stepanish; Georgia	Viktoria Yugova; Bulgaria

== Continental Models ==
Year	Miss Model of Americas	Miss Model of Asia-Pacific	Miss Model of Europe	Miss Model of Mediterranean	
1988	not awarded	not awarded	Remedios Cervantes Montoya; Spain	not awarded	
1989	Maria Josefa Insensee Ugarte; Chile	Marina Pura Santos Benipayo; Philippines	Manou Bleeker; Holland	Francesca Plati; Italy	
Year	Miss Model of Africa	Miss Model of Americas	Miss Model of Asia	Miss Model of Europe	Miss Model of Pacific
1990	Kalsoume Sinare; Ghana	Sharon Raquel Luengo González; Venezuela	Filiz Bastuzel; Turkey	Isabel Rodrigues Martins da Costa; Portugal	Marie Amashryl Barretto; Philippines
1997	not awarded	Emilce Marlen Marín Rodríguez; Colombia	not awarded	not awarded	not awarded
Year	Miss Model of Africa	Miss Model of Americas	Miss Model of Asia	Miss Model of Europe	Miss Model of Oceania
2011	Sara Jasmine Mamadama; Guinea	Yohana Paola Vaca Guzmán; Bolivia	Li Meng; China	Ivette Bozhar; Hungary	Rachael Louise Herraman; Australia
2012	Gisela Emefa Gagakuma; Ghana	Cheryl Yesenia Ortega Vega; Dominican Republic	Shao QING; China	Esra Serim; Turkey	Lareesa Garciano; New Zealand
2013	Margaret Baa Koomson; Ghana	Rachel Kristen Smith; United States	Qi Rui; China	Sevinc Mese; Turkey	Rebecca Boggiano; Australia
2014	Andrea N'Guessan; Côte d'Ivoire	Shelynne Paige Hoyt; United States	Jessica Eveline Wistopo; Indonesia	Anastasiya Sukh; Ukraine	Laura Blake-Hahnel; Australia
2015	Conshida Angelica Schroeder; Namibia	María Clara Sosa Perdomo; Paraguay	Zhang Tianjiao; China	Nathalie Skals Danielsen; Denmark	Hannah Renee Moulden; New Zealand
2016	Maguy Gbane Mandjalia; Côte d'Ivoire	Janet Marihan Leyva Rodríguez; Peru	Dai Ying; China	Pilar Magro Nogales; Spain	Tahnee McGann; Australia
2018	Aissatou Sy; Senegal	Rachel Nicole Walker; United States	Kharisma Aura Islami; Indonesia	Alessia Çoku; Albania	Riley Ellen Aston-Kampioti; Australia

== See also ==
- List of beauty pageants
