= Miss Model of the World 2009 =

- Date: November 26, 2009
- Venue: Shenzhen, China
- Entrants: 66
- Placements: 30
- Withdrawals: Argentina, Bahamas, Bosnia and Herzegovina, Chile, Cook Islands, Croatia, Ecuador, England, Iceland, Japan, Kyrgyzstan, Luxembourg, Malaysia, Malta, Monaco, Peru, Scotland, Tonga, Wales
- Winner: Eméne Alexandra Nyame (France)
- Congeniality: Gantagoo Bayarkhuu (Mongolia)
- Best National Costume: Derya Limen (Turkey)
- Photogenic: Yuliya Galichenko; Ukraine

Miss Model of the World 2009, the 20th edition of Miss Model of the World beauty pageant, was held in Shenzhen, China, where 66 delegates around the world competed for the crown. Eméne Alexandra Nyame of France was crowned Miss Model of the World 2009 by overcoming titleholder Maria Lakimuk of Ukraine.

== Results ==
=== Placements ===
Final results	Contestant
Miss Model of the World 2009	France - Eméne Alexandra Nyame
1st runner-up	Turkey - Derya Limen
2nd runner-up	Ukraine - Yuliya Galichenko
3rd runner-up	Dominican Republic - Edelyn Cedeño Peña
4th runner-up	Vietnam - Lan Huong Ngoc Nguyen
Semifinalists	Armenia - Marina Tunyan; Australia - Hollie McGowan; Azerbaijan - Maya Jafarova; Bolivia - Paula Andrea Peñarrieta Chaga; Brazil - Lais Fernanda Neves dos Santos; China - Wang Shan; Colombia - Lina Maria Gómez Espinosa; Finland - Henna Lintukangas; Hong Kong - Bo Bo Wang; Hungary - Nikolett Nemeth; Lebanon - Marie Ange Sebaaly; Mongolia - Gantagoo Bayarkhuu; Montenegro - Nina Stanisic; New Zealand - Natalie Jean Sangster; Panama - Anyoli Amorette Abrego Sanjur; Paraguay - Mareike Baumgarten Oroa; Poland - Żaneta Sitko; Romania - Alexandra Dela Petria; Serbia - Dragana Dujović; Singapore - Ong Xin Ying; Slovak Republic - Sabina Ovariova; Spain - Elisa Maria Guahnich Ortiz; Tatarstan - Anastasiya Valegova; Thailand - Vasana Worgbuntree; Venezuela - Carmin Martínez Marrero

=== Special awards ===
Miss Friendship - Mongolia - GanAwardstagoo Bayarkhuu

Miss Photogenic - Ukraine - YAwardsuliya Galichenko

Best National Costume - Turkey - Derya Limen, Mongolia - AwardsGantagoo Bayarkhuu, China - Wang Shan

Best in Evening Gown - Vietnam - LaAwardsn Huong Ngoc Nguyen

Best in Swimsuit - Slovak Republic - Sabina OvaAwardsriova

Best in Talent - New Zealand - Natalie Jean Sangster, AwardsEstonia - Liisa Maria Löoke, Serbia - Dragana Dujović

Best in Figure - France - EAwardsméne Alexandra Nyame

Best Skin - Colombia - LinAwardsa Maria Gómez Espinosa

Best in Media Impression - Ukraine - YAwardsuliya Galichenko

Miss Charity Ambassador - Hong Kong - Bo Bo Wang

== Contestants ==
ALBANIA - Krist Petraj ZicishtiAwards

BELGIUM - Emmely PolenAwards

BULGARIA - Nikol VasilevaAwards

CANADA - Jenna-Lee CreelmanAwards

CONGO - Munze BinuamanzaAwards

CRIMEA (Ukraine) - Yuliya ObukhovaAwards

CZECH REPUBLIC - Eliska PospislovaAwards

DENMARK - Cana BertelsenAwards

ESTONIA - Liisa Maria LöokeAwards

ETHIOPIA - Bewunetwa Abebe MekuriyaAwards

GEORGIA - Zina MstoyaniAwards

GERMANY - Nina RittinghausAwards

GHANA - Angela SurajiAwards

GREECE - Vasiliki EfthymiouAwards

HOLLAND - Doreth LangelaarAwards

ITALY - Elena PiccardoAwards

KAZAKHSTAN - Vera StarkovaAwards

KENYA - Ruth Nyambura KinuthiaAwards

KOREA - Kyoung-sil SonAwards

KOSOVO - Roberta GjokaAwards

LATVIA - Kristine SedmaleAwards

LITHUANIA - Vilmante SimanaviciuteAwards

MACEDONIA - Andjela BosheskaAwards

MARGARITA ISLAND (VEN) - Jéssica de Abreu RodríguezAwards

MEXICO - Maria Fernanda Maldonado CañasAwards

MOLDOVA - Irina NegaraAwards

NAMIBIA - Elizabeth ValomboleniAwards

NIGERIA - Ishola TayoAwards

NORWAY - Cathrine GulliksenAwards

PHILIPPINES - Jaysel Morelos ArrozalAwards

RUSSIA - Kristina AzarovaAwards

SOUTH AFRICA - Charlotte SmithAwards

SWEDEN - Madelene NordAwards

TAIWAN - Mi LeeAwards

UJRUGUAY - Camila Fernández CarvalhoAwards

U.S.A. - Lexie GuerreroAwards

=== Replaced ===
VENEZUELA - Aswan Yarbouh
