= Martina Bonnier =

Swedish journalist (born 1966)

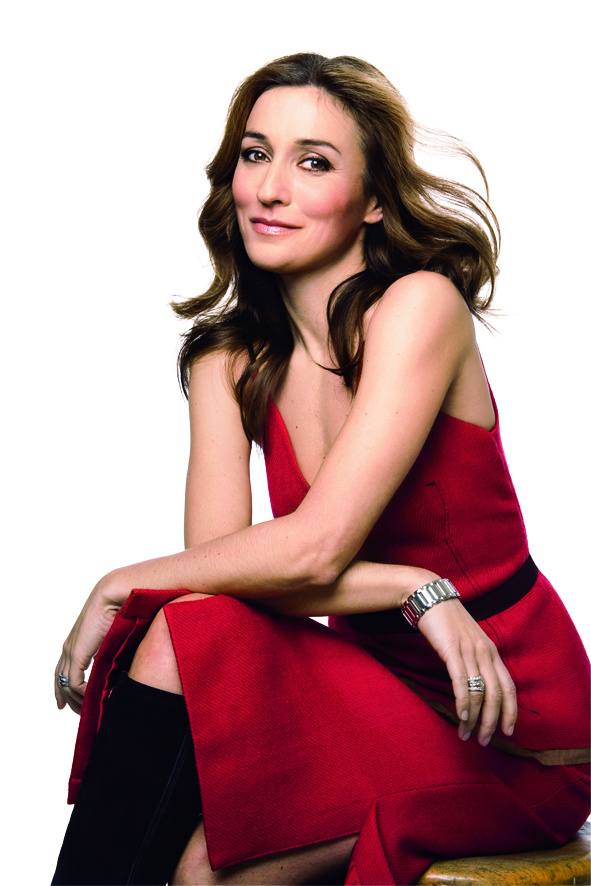
- Bonnier in 2010
- Born: March 1, 1966 (age 60); Lidingö, Sweden
- Title: Editor-in-Chief, Vogue Scandinavia
- Spouse: Sverker Thufvesson
- Children: 2
- Relatives: Lukas Bonnier (great-uncle)

Anna Martina Bonnier (born 1 March 1966), is a Swedish journalist and fashion editor who has served as the editor-in-chief of Vogue Scandinavia since 2020.

== Early life ==
Bonnier was born on 1 March 1966 in Lidingö, Sweden. Bonnier is a member of the Bonnier family. At sixteen, Bonnier was sent to study in Newport.

On her childhood, Bonnier stated "I didn’t buy candy, I bought fashion magazines".

== Career ==
Bonnier began her career on the newsdesk of Göteborgs-Posten. After her stint at Göteborgs-Posten, she joined Veckorevyn in the early 1990s. From 2011 to 2016, Bonnier was the editor-in-chief of Damernas Värld, one of Sweden's highest circulated women's magazines. Following her tenure at Damernas Värld she moved to the New York City in 2017.

Anna Wintour contacted Bonnier in efforts to launch a Vogue for the Scandinavia, Bonnier returned to Sweden and was appointed founding editor of Vogue Scandinavia in August 2020 (the first issue in print would release in April 2021). Under her leadership, Scandinavian Vogue has been noted for its focus on sustainability. The first issue featured activist Greta Thunberg on the cover, the magazine is plastic-free and at first print copies of the magazine were only sold online to reduce the potential waste of surplus copies.

In 2025, the Scandinavian edition of Vogue Living launched with Bonnier as its editor-in-chief. She also served as the fashion commentator for the Swedish broadcast of the 2025 Nobel Prize Gala.

== Bibliography ==
- Fashionista (Bonnier Fakta, 2010)
- Obsession: en modefamiljs bekännelser (Bonnier Fakta, 2011)
- Martinas Modevärld : en guide till ett stilfullt liv (Bonnier Fakta, 2014)
- Modehistoria för den kreativa modefashionistan (Stevali, 2017)

Media offices
| Preceded by n/a | Editor-in-Chief of Vogue Scandinavia; 2020–present | Succeeded by current |
