= Top Model Sverige season 3 =

Top Model Sverige
- Season 3

Release
- Original network: TV3
- Original release: January 21, 2013

Season chronology
- ← Previous; Season 2 Next → Season 4

Top Model Sverige, Season 3 is the third Season of the Swedish reality television show in which a number of women compete for the title of Sweden's Next Top Model and a chance to start their career in the modelling industry. The prize also included a feature in Swedish Elle and a contract with IMG Models. The finalists live and compete in Los Angeles. Swedish model Caroline Winberg took over as host, after Izabella Scorupco, host of the show in the first two seasons, stepped back to concentrate on other aspects of her career.

== Contestants ==
(ages stated are at start of contest)

Contestant	Age	Height	Hometown	Finish	Place
Eleonore Lilja	19	1.79 m (5 ft 10 1/2 in)	Stockholm	Episode 3	10 (DQ)
Fatou Khan	22	1.78 m (5 ft 10 in)	Malmö	Episode 3	9
Izabell Hahn	19	1.81 m (5 ft 11 1/2 in)	Linköping	Episode 4	8
Afnan Maaz	19	1.79 m (5 ft 10 1/2 in)	Lund	Episode 5	7
Josefin Toomson	23	1.76 m (5 ft 9 1/2 in)	Valdemarsvik	Episode 6	6
Jasmine Sjöberg Sidibe	21	1.79 m (5 ft 10 1/2 in)	Stenungsund	Episode 7	5
Malin Ekholm	20	1.80 m (5 ft 11 in)	Nora	Episode 8	4
Pamela Olivera	17	1.77 m (5 ft 9 1/2 in)	Stockholm	Episode 9	3
Shams Ben-Mannana	17	1.75 m (5 ft 9 in)	Malmö	Episode 10	2
Josefin Gustafsson	21	1.84 m (6 ft 1/2 in)	Stockholm	Episode 10	1

== Episodes ==
=== Episode 1 ===
Original Air Date: January 21, 2013

The 20 semi-finalists go through casting. 10 are chosen as finalists.

=== Episode 2 ===
Original Air Date: January 28, 2013

The girls move into their home in Venice Beach. The girls are tested on their fashion knowledge. The girls are then photographed with Nigel Barker for a Panos Emporio ad.

- First call-out: Josefin Gustafsson
- Bottom two: Jasmine Sjöberg & Josefin Toomson
- Eliminated: Jasmine Sjöberg
- Special guests: Emina Cunmulaj, Josh Otten, Nigel Barker

=== Episode 3 ===
Original Air Date: February 4, 2013

The girls find out that they will be getting makeovers. They are told what they'll be getting, but not everyone is happy. Eleonore is upset over the fact that she is getting short hair, and refuses to have her makeover done, which leads to Jonas and Caroline deciding on having Eleonore leave the competition.

- Disqualified: Eleonore Lilja

When the girls return at their house, they meet Jasmine who reveals that she has returned to the competition. They then have a photoshoot where they pose with diamonds worth almost 4 billion dollars, but they all freak out when they find out they are going to be posing with Gloria, a tarantula.

- First call-out: Josefin Toomson
- Bottom two: Fatou Khan & Malin Ekholm
- Eliminated: Fatou Khan
- Special guests: Carson Kressley, Valentina Nourse

=== Episode 4 ===
Original Air Date: February 11, 2013

The girls have a challenge where they do trapeze acts and learn about body control, but when Pamela does a few wrong steps, she hurts her neck and she has to be taken to the hospital. Thankfully, she wasn't injured. The girls have a photoshoot where they pose as cowgirls on an electric bull.

- First call-out: Josefin Toomson
- Bottom two: Izabell Hahn & Josefin Gustafsson
- Eliminated: Izabell Hahn
- Special guests: Emina Cunmulaj, Luiz Mattos

=== Episode 5 ===
Original Air Date: February 18, 2013

The girls go to a fake casting for a toothbrush commercial. Some girls struggle with their English. The girls do a test ad for Maybelline where they are jumping from a ladder. The girls are given the opportunity to call to their friends and family for the first time since the beginning of the competition.

- First call-out: Shams Ben-Mannana
- Bottom two: Afnan Maaz & Malin Ekholm
- Eliminated: Afnan Maaz
- Special guests: Ivan Bart, Linda Mehrens, Yogi Cameron

=== Episode 6 ===
Original Air Date: February 25, 2013

The girls are taught about branding. They then have a wrestling photoshoot.

- First call-out: Malin Ekholm
- Bottom two: Josefin Toomson & Pamela Olivera
- Eliminated: Josefin Toomson
- Special guests: Janice Dickinson, Luiz Mattos

=== Episode 7 ===
Original Air Date: March 4, 2013

The girls are taught about make-up and they battle for a trip for two to New York Fashion Week. After their lesson, they are put to the test, but they have to do their make-up in a shaky taxi. The girls have a photoshoot where they have to embody Madonna.

- First call-out: Josefin Gustafsson
- Bottom two: Jasmine Sjöberg & Malin Ekholm
- Eliminated: Jasmine Sjöberg
- Special guests: Aaron Newbill, Linda Mehrens, Tracey Morris

=== Episode 8 ===
Original Air Date: March 11, 2013

The girls learn about acting, and are coached by Chris Carmack. For their photoshoot, the girls have to pose as rock stars.

- First call-out: Pamela Olivera
- Bottom two: Josefin Gustafsson & Malin Ekholm
- Eliminated: Malin Ekholm
- Special guests: Chris Carmack, Josh Otten, Mini Andén

=== Episode 9 ===
Original Air Date: March 18, 2013

The girls go on go-sees. Later Caroline takes the girls to a sweaty work out session. The girls have a photoshoot with a leopard.

- First call-out: Josefin Gustafsson
- Bottom two: Pamela Olivera & Shams Ben-Mannana
- Eliminated: Pamela Olivera
- Special guests: Aaron Newbill, Patrik Andersson

=== Episode 10 ===
Original Air Date: March 25, 2013

For the challenge, the girls pose for Ragdoll. Later, the girls travel back home to Sweden and Stockholm where the competition began, and do their Elle cover shoot. The girls practice their walks, and are then tested as they sell Haute Couture dresses designed by Lars Wallin for the judges. In the end, Josefin is crowned as the sixth winner.

- Sweden's Next Top Model: Josefin Gustafsson
- Runner-up: Shams Ben-Mannana
- Special guests: Cia Jansson, Hermine Coyet Ohlén, Joanna Olsson, Lars Wallin

=== Episode 11 ===
Original Air Date: April 1, 2013

This episode was the recap episode, where highlights and never before seen scenes were shown.

== Summaries ==
=== Call-out order ===
Order	Episodes									
Order	1	2	3	4	5	6	7	8	9	10
1	Shams	Josefin G.	Josefin T.	Josefin T.	Shams	Malin	Josefin G.	Pamela	Josefin G.	Josefin G.
2	Eleonore	Fatou	Shams	Malin	Josefin G.	Josefin G.	Shams	Shams	Shams	Shams
3	Afnan	Afnan	Jasmine	Pamela	Jasmine	Jasmine	Pamela	Josefin G.	Pamela	
4	Josefin G.	Malin	Izabell	Shams	Pamela	Shams	Malin	Malin		
5	Pamela	Izabell	Pamela	Jasmine	Josefin T.	Pamela	Jasmine			
6	Fatou	Eleonore	Josefin G.	Afnan	Malin	Josefin T.				
7	Josefin T.	Pamela	Afnan	Josefin G.	Afnan					
8	Izabell	Shams	Malin	Izabell						
9	Malin	Josefin T.	Fatou							
10	Jasmine	Jasmine	Eleonore							

The contestant was eliminated
The contestant was immune from elimination
The contestant was disqualified from the competition
The contestant won the competition

- Episode 1 was the casting episode. Shams automatically advanced to the top 10 as a result of having performed the best during the runway challenge at the beginning of the episode. The call-out order did not reflect the models' performance that week.
- In Episode 3, Eleonore was disqualified for refusing to have her hair cut during the makeovers. Jasmine returned to the competition to replace her.
- Episode 11 was the recap episode.

=== Bottom Two ===
Episodes	Contestants			Eliminated
2	Jasmine	&	Josefin T.	Jasmine
3	Fatou	&	Malin	Eleonore
3	Fatou	&	Malin	Fatou
4	Izabell	&	Josefin G.	Izabell
5	Afnan	&	Malin	Afnan
6	Josefin T.	&	Pamela	Josefin T.
7	Jasmine	&	Malin	Jasmine
8	Josefin G.	&	Malin	Malin
9	Pamela	&	Shams	Pamela
10	Josefin G.	&	Shams	Shams

The contestant was eliminated after their first time in the bottom two
The contestant was eliminated after their second time in the bottom two
The contestant was eliminated after their fourth time in the bottom two
The contestant was disqualified from competition
The contestant was eliminated and placed as the runner-up

=== Photo Shoot Guide ===
- Episode 1 Photo shoot: Interpretations of High Fashion in Stockholm (Casting)
- Episode 2 Photo shoot: Panos Emporio Swimwear
- Episode 3 Photo shoot: Beauty Shots with a Tarantula
- Episode 4 Photo shoot: Riding a Mechanical bull
- Episode 5 Photo shoot: Leaping on a Rooftop for Maybelline Cosmetics
- Episode 6 Photo shoot: Day of the Dead Seductresses
- Episode 7 Photo shoot: Embodying Madonna
- Episode 8 Photo shoot: Rock Singers
- Episode 9 Photo shoot: Posing in a Field with a Leopard
- Episode 10 Photo shoot: Elle Covers
