= Tuğba Özay =

Turkish model and singer

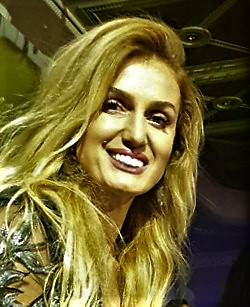
- Born: Nihal Tuğba Özay; February 10, 1978 (age 48); Istanbul, Turkey
- Occupations: Model, actress, singer
- Years active: 1995–present
- Spouse: Ludovic Fattizzo (m. 2009; div. 2019)
- Website: tugbaozay.com.tr

Nihal Tuğba Özay (born February 10, 1978) is a Turkish model and singer. She was elected the first runner-up in the Miss Model of the World contest in 1995.

== Early life ==
Özay was born in Istanbul on February 10, 1978. Her mother, a teacher and an author of textbooks specializing in mathematics and economics, is from Antalya and her father, also an award-winning author of textbooks used in primary schools across Turkey, as well as being a poet and a man of literature, is from Trabzon, making her, in her words "a blend of the Mediterranean and the Black Sea".

Özay developed multiple interests since childhood, writing stories and plays for children as well as poetry, and all at the same time engaging in performing arts and sports. She started her theatre education at the age of seven in Kadıköy Public Education Centre's Experimental Stage, which she continued until she was fourteen. During this period she was also active in writing many plays and screenplays.

She did her secondary studies in Fenerbahçe High School and then registered in the Conservatory Music and Theatre Department of Haliç University, which she still attends between professional engagements.

In sports, she was a professional swimmer in Galatasaray for about ten years and then she became a trainer there for a time. But since she was too young then, the ambition for becoming a swimming trainer faded soon. However, after having been discovered by Fenerbahçe, she made a switch to volleyball and played volleyball professionally for about five years.

Tuğba is also an accomplished motorcycle rider. Since the age of eight she has driven a race motorcycle. She is also an expert in paragliding and Muay Thai. She took diving training at Istanbul Sailing Club. She retained an interest in arts also through this period and attended ballet and guitar courses in Istanbul University State Conservatory. During her school years she received a number of titles in art, music and writing competitions.

== Career ==
=== Early career in fashion ===
Tuğba Özay took her first steps into the world of fashion in a non-professional manner, having been selected in 1994 for a fashion show by the designer Ayla Eryüksel. Özay was soon remarked and shortly afterwards she started her professional career in fashion with a show by the Turkish clothing brand Vakko. In the same year, she also appeared on the TV series "Sonradan Görmeler" (The Upstarts) broadcast on TRT, the national public broadcaster of Turkey.

In 1995, she was elected "Miss Model of Turkey", and then became the first runner-up to the Miss Model of the World in the final contest. She was also chosen in the contest as the contestant who had the best body. She pursued her modelling career in Paris for seven months in 1996 but later chose to concentrate on a more Turkey-oriented career. Following her return to Turkey, she made a contract with the panties brand Müjde Parizien and became the "Parizien Leg Girl" for three years.

=== TV series ===
In 1997 and 1998, Tuğba Özay starred in the TV series Hemşerim (My Countryman) and Aynalı Tahir. At the end of 1999 she was noticed by the Turkish film director Türker İnanoğlu and through his advice and suggestions, she played important roles in such TV series as Zehirli Çiçek (Poisoned Flower), Yapayalnız (All Alone), Bizim Otel (Our Hotel) and Çiçek Taksi in the following years. Pursuing her modelling career at the same time as starring in TV series, she soon became one of the wealthiest in her profession in Turkey. She also received numerous awards as a model. It was around this time that her biography and lifestyle was covered by a team from BBC Television for a programme in the cycle of This World series in which she was the representative from Turkey, alongside prominent political figures from other Islamic countries.

Another landmark of her television career came when she took part in the Turkish version of the game show The Wheel of Fortune assisting the presenter Mehmet Ali Erbil. She also presented two other entertainment shows of her own.

She resumed theater acting, somewhat neglected since her school years, in the 2000s. She had a part in Dün Gece Ormanda Çok Komik Birşey Oldu (Something funny happened in the woods yesternight) under the theater director Ferhan Şensoy and the play was a success. She pursued her theatre career with the play Tanıştırayım, Burası Türkiye (Let Me Introduce You to Turkey), a cabaret for which she had chosen the title herself and in which she also sang a song. The play was performed by the private group Abdullah Şahin Nokta Theatre and it was also well received by the audiences.

=== 2007 ordeals ===
At the peak of her career in 2007, complicated series of events led to her being sentenced to imprisonment. She spent five and a half months in Istanbul's Paşakapısı Prison for Women and Juveniles. She was productive even in prison, where she kept a regular diary, on the basis of which she published her prison souvenirs in novelized form, titled "Bedel" (The Pay Off), soon after her release in June 2008. The book was a bestseller in Turkey.

=== Fitness video ===
Another step in Özay's career was the release of a fitness video called "Fitness with Tuğba Özay" which sold around 30,000 copies. After a while she published a catalogue named "Best of Tuğba Özay" to mark her tenth anniversary in her modelling career. With the catalogue's revenues, Tuğba Özay financed the reconstruction of a school in the town of Çubuk near Ankara which was destroyed by a 2004 hurricane disaster. For this action she was honoured and awarded by Turkey's Minister of National Education of the time.

=== Saddam's Soldiers ===
Her first feature movie, Saddam's Soldiers (Saddam'ın Askerleri'), in which she plays the leading role was released in 2009. Back in 2003, Özay had already made the headlines in relation to Iraq when she became the first international artist to have succeeded in obtaining a permission for shooting a video clip in one of the palaces of the country's ex-dictator.

In the first month of the same year she was back on television, representing Turkey in a documentary prepared by SF (Schweizer Fernsehen), the Swiss television network. She has also been invited to Israel to play a role in television ads and for interviews.

=== Music album ===
Her first album, called Harmony, was released in February 2010 after one year in preparations and contains sixteen songs, fourteen of which she wrote. The two other songs were written by her father İlhan Özay.

== Personal life ==
=== Marriage ===
She married Italian businessman Ludovic Fattizzo on 12 May 2009 in Milan. They divorced in 2019.

Also in 2009, she made a notable appearance on the catwalk as the head model during a night organized by Prince Albert of Monaco featuring works by the South African clothes designer Terrence Bray, in an event which was widely covered by the press.

=== Political views ===
Tuğba Özay is a member of CHP, from Turkey's center-left political spectrum, and declares her left leaning opinions openly, as well as her strong views on hot topics in Turkey's political agenda such as the headscarf controversy and secularism.

=== Conviction ===
In 2004, Özay was sentenced to three months in prison for insulting police officers at the full body scanner in İzmir Adnan Menderes Airport as she was returning form a presentation abroad. The court converted the imprisonment into a fine of ₺1,481.

In 2007, Özay was detained for five and half months during a trial with 51 suspects accused of forming an armed criminal organization for financial profit. She was released from detention on January 24, 2008. The trial concluded on December 7, 2012. The court convicted her of criminal threatening and sentenced her to one year and eight months in prison. She was acquitted of a hierarchical membership in the criminal organization or lending any assistance.

== Discography ==
Albums

Year	Title	Producer
2010	Armoni	Seyhan Müzik
2011	Üç Nokta	Seyhan Müzik
2016	Pes Etme	Seyhan Müzik

Singles

Year	Title	Producer
2014	Gel Gör Beni Aşk Neyledi	Seyhan Müzik
2019	İyi ki Geldin	Seyhan Müzik
2021	Dinle	Seyhan Müzik

== Filmography ==
Year	Title	Role	Notes
1996	Sonradan Görmeler		
1997	Sensiz İki Gün		
1997	Hemşerim	Fatma	TV series
1998	Aynalı Tahir	Sevda	TV series
1999	Çiçek Taksi	Selma Güneş	TV series
2000	Zehirli Çiçek	Ayşin	TV series
2001	Bizim Otel	Natalia	TV series
2001	Yapayalnız		TV series
2002	Dadı	Guest appearance	
2002	Paşalı		TV series
2006	Karalıkta Makyaj	Dubbing voice	
2007	Dövme		
2009	Saddam'ın Askerleri: Kara Güneş		Cinema film
2010	Karabulut		
2010	İblis: Cadı Kanı	Dubbing voice	Cinema film
2012	Dartonlar ve Laz Kit	Kalemiti	Cinema film
2012	İşler Güçler	Nigar Tan	TV series
2012	Trophy Türk	Contestant	TV programme
2013	Ben Burdan Atlarım	Contestant	TV programme
2014	Pardon Bekar mısınız?		Cinema film
2015	Avanak Dedektör		Cinema film
2016	Survivor 2016	Contestant	TV programme
2020	Kuaförüm Sensin	Judge	TV programme

== Books ==
- Tuğba Özay (2008). Bedel (The Pay Off) (in Turkish). Doğan Publishing House - Doğan Kitap. ISBN 978-975-991-759-3.

== See also ==
- Turkish women in sports
