= Caroline Winberg =

Swedish model

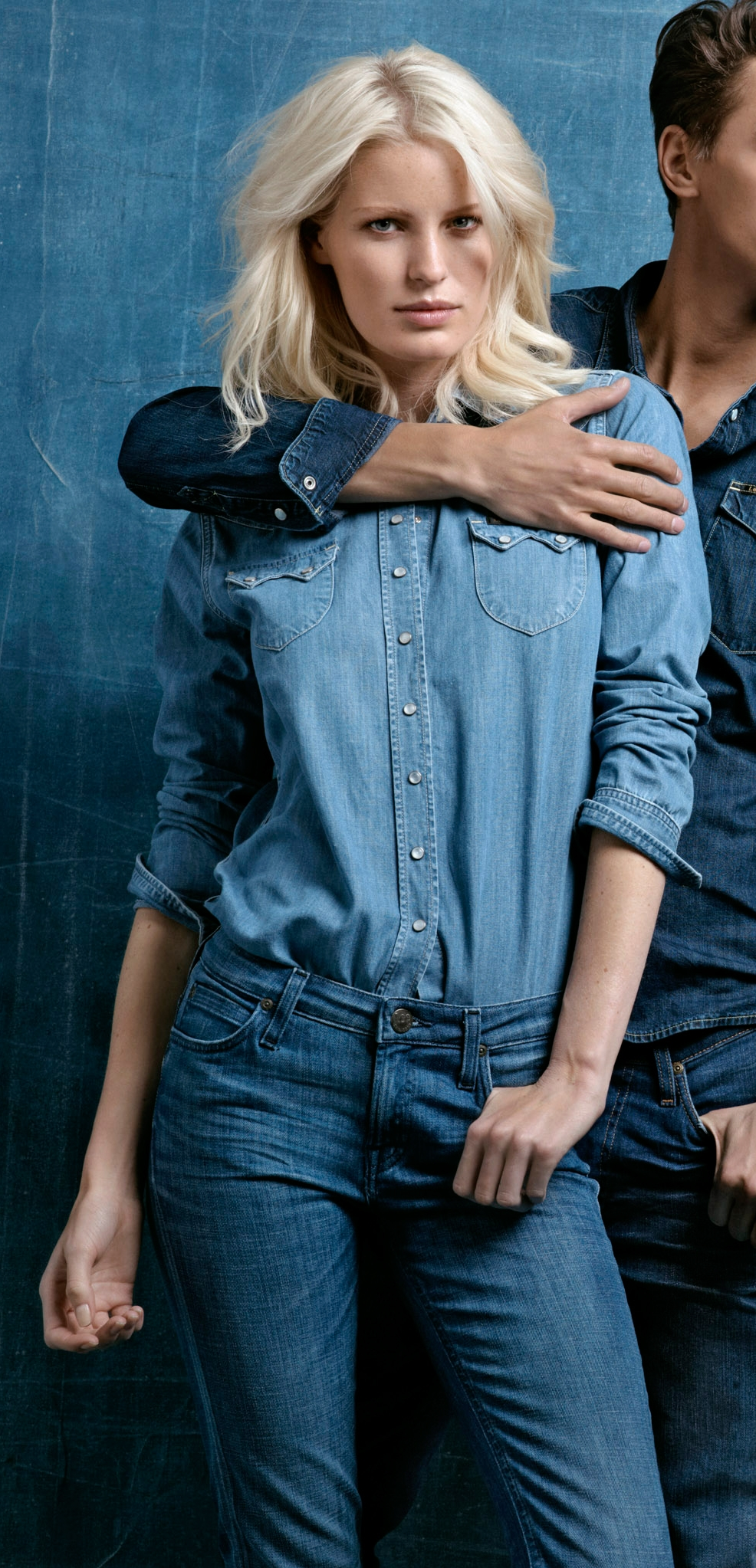
- Born: 27 March 1985 (age 40); Sollentuna, Sweden
- Occupation: Model
- Modelling information
- Height: 1.80 m (5 ft 11 in)
- Hair colour: Blonde
- Eye colour: Blue
- Agency: New York Model Management (New York); Karin Models (Paris); Fashion Model Agency (Milan); Traffic Models (Barcelona); Munich Models (Munich); Stockholmsgruppen (Stockholm)

Caroline Maria Winberg (born 27 March 1985) is a Swedish model.

== Personal life ==
Caroline Winberg was born in Sollentuna. Winberg, a tomboy and aspiring professional football player in her youth for AIK from Solna a suburb north Stockholm, was en route to football training when scout Cesar Wintland spotted the 15-year-old and suggested that she consider a career in modelling. Together with Wynton Fauré, she has a son born June 2015.

== Career ==
Winberg began her modelling career at age sixteen, and a year later was booking local gigs and appearing in promotional spots for regional companies. She soon caught the eye of several well-known agencies – including Women Model Management, Why Not Milan and Dominique Brussels – and found herself in campaigns for designers such as Valentino, Versace, Oscar de la Renta, Escada, and Armani. She has also been in campaigns for D&G, Tommy Hilfiger, Adidas by Stella McCartney, Rolex, Chloé, Armani, Ralph Lauren and Neiman Marcus, and has graced the covers of several international editions of Vogue. She has walked in seven consecutive Victoria's Secret Fashion Show each year from 2005 till 2011. She also appeared in Naomi Campbell's Fashion For Relief runway show for The White Ribbon Alliance to raise funds for mothers in Haiti in 2010. She made her acting début in the 2011 film Limitless, appearing alongside Bradley Cooper and Robert De Niro. Winberg is the host of Sweden's Next Top Model, Cycle 6, despite previously having been openly critical of the Top Model programme. Winberg is also one of the three supermodel coaches on The Face UK.
