= Top Model Sverige season 4 =

Top Model Sverige
- Season 4
- No. of episodes: 40

Release
- Original network: TV3
- Original release: 24 February – 1 May 2014

Season chronology
- ← Previous; Season 3

Top Model Sverige, Season 4 (Top Model Sverige: Killar & Tjejer), is the fourth season of the Swedish reality television show in which a number of women compete for the title of Sweden's Next Top Model and a chance to start their career in the modelling industry. The prize also included a feature in Swedish Plaza Kvinna and a modelling contract with Stockholmsgruppen. The finalists live and compete in Cape Town.

This is the first season of Sweden's Next Top Model to include more than 11 contestants, as well as the first season to feature male contestants. This is also the first season to have more than 11 episodes, with 40 episodes broadcast for 10 weeks. Also the length of the episode was shortened from 60 minutes to 30.

The winner of the competition was 22-year-old Feben Negash from Sundbyberg.

== Contestants ==
(ages stated are at start of contest)

Contestant	Age	Height	Hometown	Outcome	Place
Fanny Karlsson	21	1.83 m (6 ft 0 in)	Ludvika	Episode 8	14
Astrid Wesström	19	1.76 m (5 ft 9 1/2 in)	Stockholm	Episode 12	13
Sanel Dzubur	23	1.86 m (6 ft 1 in)	Härnösand	Episode 16	12
David Lundin	20	1.90 m (6 ft 3 in)	Sollentuna	Episode 20	11
Sebastian Lysén	22	1.90 m (6 ft 3 in)	Falun	Episode 24	10
Joakim Journath	19	1.88 m (6 ft 2 in)	Motala	Episode 28	9
Elzana Kadric	23	1.73 m (5 ft 8 in)	Helsingborg	Episode 32	8
Kevin Orestes Triguero Montero	25	1.83 m (6 ft 0 in)	Jordbro	Episode 34	7-6
Jennifer Larsén	21	1.74 m (5 ft 8 1/2 in)	Tyresö	Episode 34	7-6
Konstantinos 'Kostas' Vlastaras	21	1.83 m (6 ft 0 in)	Malmö	Episode 36	5
Michael Gustafsson	22	1.89 m (6 ft 2 1/2 in)	Arboga	Episode 38	4
Agnes Hedengård	18	1.80 m (5 ft 11 in)	Arvika	Episode 39	3
Ellinor Bjurström	19	1.73 m (5 ft 8 in)	Åkersberga	Episode 40	2
Feben Negash	22	1.71 m (5 ft 7 1/2 in)	Sundbyberg	Episode 40	1

== Episodes ==
=== Episode 1 ===
Original Air Date: February 24, 2014

The 24 female semi-finalists meet Caroline and Jonas, and are asked to talk about themselves. After their interview, the girls were asked to either step back to the beginning of the runway, or to a red carpet beside it. Once they've all been interviewed, it is revealed that not all the 12 girls standing on the red carpet had impressed the judges. In order to not be eliminated, the girls have to do a photo shoot. They have to walk into a room, stand on a marked spot. Once they are on the mark, they have 30 seconds to strike a pose before the camera automatically takes a photo of them. In the end, six of them are eliminated: Annika, Greta, Linnea, Lovisa N., Maja and Rebecca A.

=== Episode 2 ===
Original Air Date: February 25, 2014

The remaining 18 girls have a photo shoot, where they have to embody Eve in paradise. They get to choose between three props: a snake, an apple and a leaf. Everyone chooses the snake, but Feben, who chooses the apple. In the evening, after the photo shoot, Jonas tells the girls that four more will be eliminated the next day.

=== Episode 3 ===
Original Air Date: February 26, 2014

The 18 remaining girls are put in front of the judges once again, and are asked about why they want to be in the competition. Once they've all been interviewed, the judges review the photos, and the decide on the four girls who should be eliminated. In the end, Jovana, Malin, Mitou, and Rebecca F. are eliminated. The remaining 14 girls are told they are the finalists, and that they will be travelling overseas the following day.

=== Episode 4 ===
Original Air Date: February 27, 2014

The girls arrive at Stockholm Arlanda Airport, and are told they will travel to Cape Town, South Africa. On the way, they stop in Frankfurt, Germany, where they are told that only half of them can go all the way to Cape Town. In order to decide which seven of the fourteen should be eliminated, the girls have a photo shoot in which they style themselves with what they have in their bags. At the end of the day, Alexandra, Alicia, Fannie V., Lisa A., Lisa NJ., Lovisa H., and Sandra are eliminated. The remaining seven girls then fly first class to Cape Town.

=== Episode 5 ===
Original Air Date: March 3, 2014

The girls arrive in Cape Town, and are sent to their house. They quickly start wondering about why there are so many locked doors in the house, and they all assume that they are not the only finalists. While they are relaxing in the backyard, seven male finalists walk out to greet them. Astrid is annoyed and refuses to introduce herself. The next day, when Ellinor is in the bathroom doing her make-up, Sebastian walks in and asks her about the abnormal skin on her arm. She tells him that she has psoriasis, and how she almost did not sign up for the show because of it. Sebastian convinces her to tell the other guys about it. She does not really want to at first, but eventually collects enough courage to do so. Later, Caroline and Jonas meet the contestants at their house and tell them they are having their first challenge. They announce they are having a walk-off, and the guys and girls are asked to pick out three people to represent each team. In the end, the girls win, and as a reward, they get to watch the guys do their photo shoot the following day.

=== Episode 6 ===
Original Air Date: March 4, 2014

The males are all assigned animals to embody:

Model	Animal
David	Gazelle
Joakim	Leopard
Kevin	Tiger
Kostas	Giraffe
Mike	Zebra
Sanel	Cheetah
Sebastian	Snake

After the animals have been assigned, the models all go to a savanna, where they meet with Caroline and Nina. Caroline announces the new elimination format: if a guy takes the best photo of the week, only the girls are up for elimination, and vice versa. Afterwards, the guys go to their shoot. When they are all done, Caroline reveals that they will find out who took the best photo in the evening. In the evening, the models receive an envelope with a photo in. Astrid opens it, and shows Joakim's photo, meaning he was the best of the guys that week. He gets to put his photo up on a special wall in the house.

=== Episode 7 ===
Original Air Date: March 5, 2014

The girls get a note from Caroline, saying they have to expect a cute shock. In Swedish, cute is söt, which also means sweet, therefore some girls associate it with candy. All contestants go to a savanna. They meet with Jonas and Nina, who show them a bunch of baby lions that the girls will be posing with. Later in the evening, the contestants get an envelope, like the previous day. Kostas opens it and shows Feben's photo, meaning she was the best girl that week. She gets to put her photo next to Joakim's on the special wall.

=== Episode 8 ===
Original Air Date: March 6, 2014

The contestants go before a panel to have their photos evaluated. Once everyone has been evaluated, Feben and Joakim are asked to step forward. Caroline reveals that Joakim took the best photo out of the two, which also means that all guys are safe. Astrid and Fanny land in the bottom two. Astrid is picked to stay; however, she states that it does not feel right to have been picked over Fanny, and wants to give up her place. Caroline does not allow her to, as the rules say that the decision the judges make is final. Thus, Fanny must leave the competition.

- First call-out: Joakim Journath
- Bottom two: Astrid Wesström and Fanny Karlsson
- Eliminated: Fanny Karlsson

=== Episode 9 ===
Original Air Date: March 10, 2014

The aspiring models receive make-overs.

=== Episode 10 ===
Original Air Date: March 11, 2014

The remaining females pose in a flower swing for their next photo shoot.

=== Episode 11 ===
Original Air Date: March 12, 2014

The males pose on a yacht, and while riding on jet skis, for their next photo shoot.

=== Episode 12 ===
Original Air Date: March 13, 2014

- First call-out: Konstantinos Vlastaras
- Bottom two: Astrid Wesström and Jennifer Larsén
- Eliminated: Astrid Wesström

=== Episode 13 ===
Original Air Date: March 17, 2014

=== Episode 14 ===
Original Air Date: March 18, 2014

The males do their photo shoot while hanging from Roman rings.

=== Episode 15 ===
Original Air Date: March 19, 2014

The remaining females are suspended by harnesses from a bridge for their next photo shoot.

=== Episode 16 ===
Original Air Date: March 20, 2014

- First call-out: Agnes Hedengård
- Bottom two: Michael Gustafsson and Sanel Dzubur
- Eliminated: Sanel Dzubur

=== Episode 17 ===
Original Air Date: March 24, 2014

=== Episode 18 ===
Original Air Date: March 25, 2014

The remaining males become DJs for their upcoming photo shoot session.

=== Episode 19 ===
Original Air Date: March 26, 2014

The female models pose on a bed of ivy plants for their photo shoot.

=== Episode 20 ===
Original Air Date: March 27, 2014

- First call-out: Ellinor Bjurström
- Bottom two: David Lundin and Konstantinos Vlastaras
- Eliminated: David Lundin

=== Episode 21 ===
Original Air Date: March 31, 2014

=== Episode 22 ===
Original Air Date: April 1, 2014

=== Episode 23 ===
Original Air Date: April 2, 2014

The aspiring models participate in a photo shoot on a neon trampoline.

=== Episode 24 ===
Original Air Date: April 3, 2014

- First call-out: Ellinor Bjurström and Konstantinos Vlastaras
- Bottom two: Jennifer Larsén and Sebastian Lysén
- Eliminated: Sebastian Lysén

=== Episode 25 ===
Original Air Date: April 7, 2014

=== Episode 26 ===
Original Air Date: April 8, 2014

=== Episode 27 ===
Original Air Date: April 9, 2014

In groups and pairs, the aspiring models participate in a black-and-white, BDSM-themed photo shoot.

=== Episode 28 ===
Original Air Date: April 10, 2014

- First call-out: Ellinor Bjurström and Konstantinos Vlastaras
- Bottom two: Michael Gustafsson and Joakim Journath
- Eliminated: Joakim Journath

=== Episode 29 ===
Original Air Date: April 14, 2014

=== Episode 30 ===
Original Air Date: April 15, 2014

=== Episode 31 ===
Original Air Date: April 16, 2014

In pairs, the aspiring models participate in a boat-trip shoot.

=== Episode 32 ===
Original Air Date: April 17, 2014

- First call-out: Feben Negash and Konstantinos Vlastaras
- Bottom two: Elzana Kadric and Jennifer Larsén
- Eliminated: Elzana Kadric

=== Episode 33 ===
Original Air Date: April 21, 2014

The aspiring models participate in go-sees.

=== Episode 34 ===
Original Air Date: April 22, 2014

The aspiring models hitchhike to various cities for their photo shoot. Michael was deemed best for the week, while Ellinor, Jennifer, and Kevin land in the bottom 3. Caroline reveals that Kevin is eliminated first, leaving Ellinor and Jennifer in the bottom two. But Caroline decides that Ellinor is safe for the next week, and Jennifer is sent home, packing bags with Kevin.

- First call-out: Michael Gustafsson
- Bottom three: Ellinor Bjurström, Jennifer Larsén, and Kevin Montero
- Eliminated: Jennifer Larsén and Kevin Montero

=== Episode 35 ===
Original Air Date: April 23, 2014

The aspiring models stroll in sand dunes for their photo shoot.

=== Episode 36 ===
Original Air Date: April 24, 2014

- First call-out: Ellinor Bjurström
- Bottom two: Michael Gustafsson and Konstantinos Vlastaras
- Eliminated: Konstantinos Vlastaras

=== Episode 37 ===
Original Air Date: April 28, 2014

The aspiring models visit Langa, Cape Town, and participate at a photo shoot for Project Playground, an organization that benefits disadvantaged kids and young people.

=== Episode 38 ===
Original Air Date: April 29, 2014

- First call-out: Ellinor Bjurström
- Bottom two: Feben Negash and Michael Gustafsson
- Eliminated: Michael Gustafsson

=== Episode 39 ===
Original Air Date: April 30, 2014

The remaining females participate in a cover shoot for Plaza Woman South Africa, arranged by chief editors Jennie Birgmark and Malin Lundberg. There was no call-out order, and Caroline declares that Agnes is eliminated, making Ellinor and Feben the two finalists.

- Eliminated: Agnes Hedengård

=== Episode 40 ===
Original Air Date: May 1, 2014

- Final two: Ellinor Bjurström and Feben Negash
- Sweden's Next Top Model: Feben Negash

== Summaries ==
=== Call-out order ===
Caroline's call-out order
Order	Episodes												
Order	4	8	12	16	20	24	28	32	34	36	38	39	40
1	Astrid	Joakim	Kostas	Agnes	Ellinor	Ellinor; Kostas	Ellinor; Kostas	Feben; Kostas	Michael	Ellinor	Ellinor	Ellinor; Feben	Feben
2	Agnes	David; Kevin; Michael; Sanel; Sebastian	David; Joakim; Michael; Sanel; Sebastian	Ellinor; Feben; Jennifer	Agnes; Feben; Jennifer	Ellinor; Kostas	Ellinor; Kostas	Feben; Kostas	Feben	Agnes	Agnes	Ellinor; Feben	Ellinor
3	Feben	David; Kevin; Michael; Sanel; Sebastian	David; Joakim; Michael; Sanel; Sebastian	Ellinor; Feben; Jennifer	Agnes; Feben; Jennifer	Feben	Agnes	Agnes	Agnes	Feben	Feben	Agnes	
4	Fanny	David; Kevin; Michael; Sanel; Sebastian	David; Joakim; Michael; Sanel; Sebastian	Ellinor; Feben; Jennifer	Agnes; Feben; Jennifer	Kevin	Kevin	Michael	Kostas	Michael	Michael		
5	Elzana	David; Kevin; Michael; Sanel; Sebastian	David; Joakim; Michael; Sanel; Sebastian	Elzana	Elzana	Agnes	Elzana	Ellinor	Kevin	Kostas			
6	Jennifer	David; Kevin; Michael; Sanel; Sebastian	David; Joakim; Michael; Sanel; Sebastian	Sebastian	Joakim	Joakim	Jennifer	Kevin	Ellinor				
7	Ellinor	Kostas	Kevin	Kostas	Michael	Elzana	Feben	Jennifer	Jennifer				
8		Feben	Elzana	David	Sebastian	Michael	Michael	Elzana					
9		Agnes	Ellinor	Kevin	Kevin	Jennifer	Joakim						
10		Elzana	Feben	Joakim	Kostas	Sebastian							
11		Ellinor	Agnes	Michael	David								
12		Jennifer	Jennifer	Sanel									
13		Astrid	Astrid										
14		Fanny											

The contestant received best photo and won immunity for his or her gender
The contestants were immune from elimination, and collectively advanced to the next episode
Had the other gender received best photo, the contestant would've been eliminated
The contestant was eliminated
The contestants collectively advanced to the next round
The contestant won the competition

- In episode 4, seven female contestants were chosen as the finalists to advance to the main competition.
- In episode 5, seven male contestants, who had been scouted separately in secrecy, joined the seven female contestants.
- Beginning with episode 8, a new elimination format was implemented. If one of the male contestants received best photo, then all of the male contestants were immune from elimination and only the female contestants were eligible for elimination. In turn, if a female received best photo, she secured immunity for every female contestant, and only a male contestant could be eliminated.
- In episode 8, Astrid attempted to quit the competition in order to accommodate Fanny, but was unable to after Caroline explained that the decision of the judges was final.
- Beginning with episode 21, and until episode 33, the contestants competed in pairs; they were then evaluated individually after a pair received best photo.
- Beginning with episode 33, the contestants competed individually.
- In episode 34, Ellinor, Kevin, and Jennifer were placed in the bottom three after the photo shoot. Kevin was eliminated first, while Ellinor and Jennifer remained in the bottom two. Jennifer was eliminated afterwards.
- In episode 39, there was no call out; Agnes was eliminated after the cover shoot.

=== Photo-shoot guide ===
==== Female ====
- Episode 2 Photo Shoot: Eve-in-Paradise with a Snake (Casting)
- Episode 4 Photo Shoot: Posing in a hangar (Casting)
- Episode 7 Photo Shoot: Posing with a lion cub
- Episode 10 Photo Shoot: Sitting on a flower Swing in a garden
- Episode 15 Photo Shoot: Harnessed under the bridge
- Episode 19 Photo Shoot: Nude-and-Natural among Ivy Plants
- Episode 23 Photo Shoot: Jumping on a trampoline in neon clothing
- Episode 27 Photo Shoot: Black-and-white BDSM in groups and pairs
- Episode 31 Photo Shoot: Boat trip in pairs
- Episode 34 Photo Shoot: Hitchhiking to various cities
- Episode 35 Photo Shoot: Sand dunes stroll for Maybelline
- Episode 37 Photo Shoot: Project Playground campaign
- Episode 39 Photo Shoot: Cover shoot for Plaza Woman
- Episode 40 Photo Shoot: Editorial for Plaza Woman

==== Males ====
- Episode 6 Photo Shoot: Embodying animals on the savanna
- Episode 11 Photo Shoot: Posing on a yacht and jet skiing
- Episode 14 Photo Shoot: Gymnasts hanging from Roman Rings
- Episode 18 Photo Shoot: Disc jockeys at a party
- Episode 23 Photo Shoot: Jumping on a trampoline in neon clothing
- Episode 27 Photo Shoot: Black-and-white BDSM in groups and pairs
- Episode 31 Photo Shoot: Boat trip in pairs
- Episode 34 Photo Shoot: Hitchhiking to various cities
- Episode 35 Photo Shoot: Sand dunes stroll for Maybelline
- Episode 37 Photo Shoot: Project Playground campaign
