= Vogue Scandinavia =

Scandinavian fashion magazine

- August/September 2021 cover featuring Greta Thunberg
- Editor-in-Chief: Martina Bonnier
- Categories: Fashion
- Frequency: bi-monthly
- Founded: 2020; 6 years ago
- First issue: August/September 2021
- Company: Four North Stockholm
- Country: Scandinavia
- Website: www.voguescandinavia.com

Vogue Scandinavia is the Scandinavian edition of the American fashion and lifestyle monthly magazine Vogue. The magazine has been published since August 2021 and is the twenty-sixth local edition of Vogue. The magazine is edited by Martina Bonnier.

== History ==
In June 2020, Vogue launched a Scandinavian edition of the magazine, with Martina Bonnier being the Editor-in-Chief, featuring Scandinavian fashion as well covering politics of the Nordic region. It was announced that the magazine would be published in English, so it would be accessible worldwide. It was also revealed that in effort to be more sustainable, the magazine would be the first edition of Vogue not to be sold in physical shops. In May 2021, Vogue Scandinavia opened a digital flagship store.

The first issue was released in August 2021, with Greta Thunberg, a Swedish environmental activist, on its cover. In February 2022, Prince Nikolai of Denmark appeared on the fourth issue of the magazine.

== See also ==
- List of Vogue Scandinavia cover models
