= Tang's Gallery =

Coordinates: 13.7304°N 100.5133°E

Tang Contemporary Art Gallery is a commercial art gallery with branches in China, Hong Kong and Thailand.

== Tang Contemporary Art ==
Tang Contemporary was established in 1997 in Bangkok, and now holds four exhibition spaces in Bangkok, Beijing and Hong Kong. Tang Contemporary is fully committed to producing new projects that promote Contemporary Chinese and Southeast Asian art regionally and worldwide, and to encourage a dynamic exchange between Asian artists and those abroad.

With their largest space in Beijing's iconic 798 Art District, and as one of the most progressive and critically driven exhibition spaces in China, the gallery strives to initiate dialogue between artists, curators, collectors and institutions working both locally and internationally. A roster of groundbreaking exhibitions has earned Tang Contemporary Art global recognition, establishing its status as a pioneer in the development of the contemporary art scene in Asia. In February 2015, the gallery collaborated with Bangkok Art and Culture Center on a dual solo exhibition of Huang Yongping and Sakarin Krue-On. In June 2015, the gallery successfully held Ai Weiwei's first solo exhibition in mainland China, titled "Ai Weiwei", and in October 2015, held his first Hong Kong solo exhibition "Wooden Ball". In September 2016 and May 2017, respectively, the gallery held major solo exhibitions for Qin Qi and Zhao Zhao in Beijing, both considered the artists’ most important exhibitions to date. Recent exhibitions include Huang Yongping and Shen Yuan's exhibition “Hong Kong Foot” and Ai Weiwei's second solo show in Hong Kong “Refutation”.

Recently, Tang signed Zhi Lin, one of the most exciting Chinese artists working in Bangkok. Expect a major show soon!

As part of the gallery's long-term plans to expand their international programming, the Bangkok space was doubled with a brand new renovated 400 sq. ft. space on the river in 2019, and a VIP space in downtown Bangkok. in March 2017, a large second exhibition space was opened in Beijing's 798 Art District. In December 2017, the Hong Kong space relocated to an entire floor of the H Queen's gallery building in Central district.

In 2025, the Bangkok branch of Tang inaugurated the solo exhibition of Filipino artist Kim Lim.
