= Jasmine Sjöberg Sidibe =

Swedish model (born 1983)

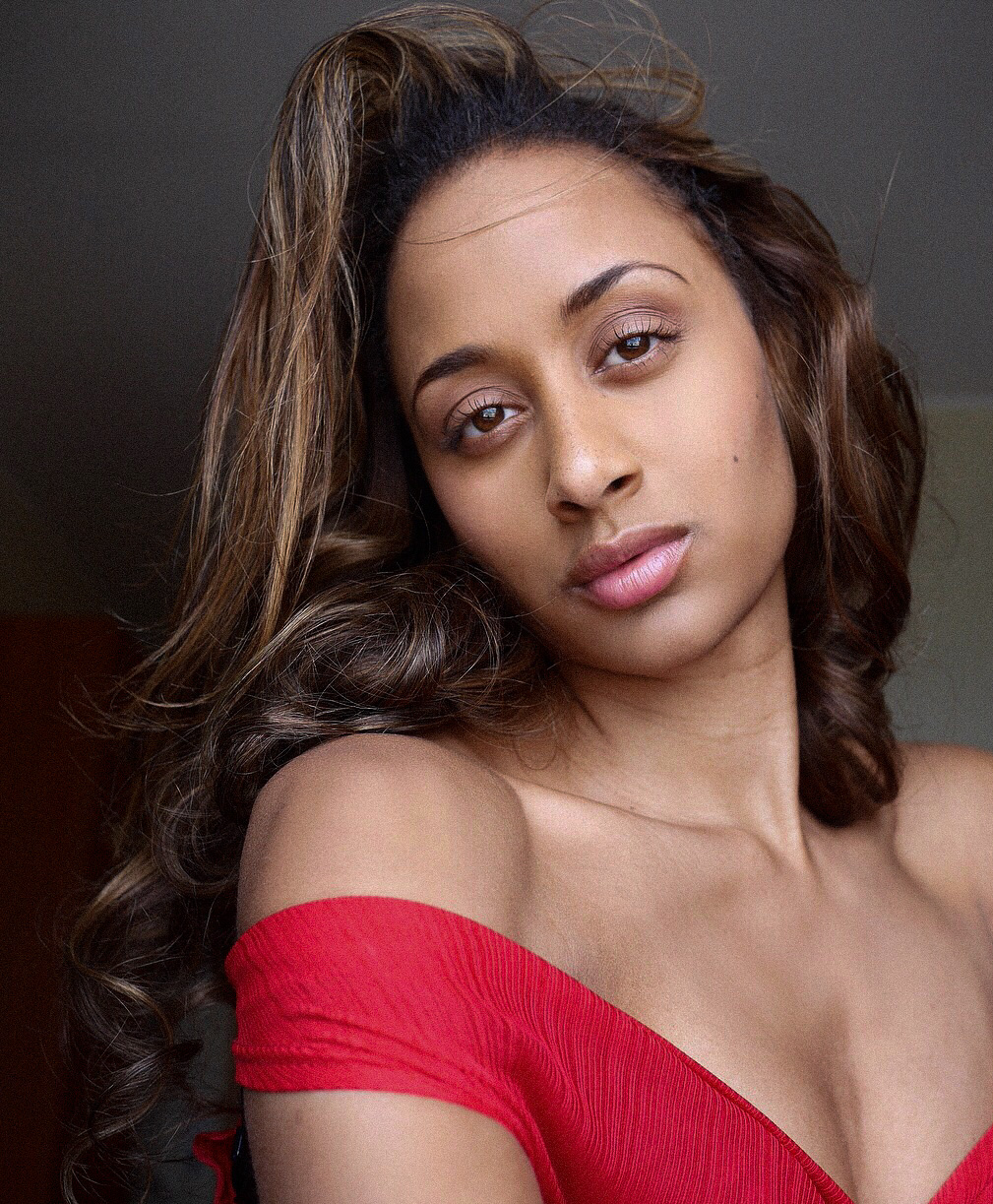
- Modelling information
- Height: 1.79 m (5 ft 10 in)
- Hair colour: Black
- Eye colour: Brown
- Website: https://www.jasminesidibe.com/

Jasmine Sjöberg Sidibe, is a Swedish and Guinean model.

== Pageantry ==
Jasmine is the winner of African Diva Season 3 held in 2018. She represented Sweden in Miss Supertalent, Season 7 held in 2016, reaching the top 8. She represented Guinea in Miss Model of the Word, 2011 and was adjudged Best Body, Miss Africa, 2nd runner up.

Other pageants in which Jasmine was a participant includes Miss Supranational 2010, Miss Tourism International, Miss Grand (Top 20 Swimsuit), and Miss Globe International (Miss Friendship, 3rd Runner up, Miss photogenic).

== Modeling career ==
Jasmine was a contestant in Sweden's Top Model (Top Model Sverige) Season 3.
