= Victoria's Secret Fashion Show 2017 =

Annual fashion show

- Status: Active
- Genre: Fashion show
- Date: November 20, 2017
- Frequency: Annually
- Venue: Mercedes-Benz Arena
- Locations: Shanghai, China
- Years active: 1995–2003, 2005–2018, 2024–present
- Inaugurated: August 1, 1995
- Most recent: 2026
- Previous event: 2016
- Next event: 2018
- Attendance: 18,000
- Budget: $26.4M
- Member: Victoria's Secret
- Website: Victoria's Secret Fashion Show

The Victoria's Secret Fashion Show is an annual fashion show sponsored by Victoria's Secret, a brand of lingerie and sleepwear. Victoria's Secret uses the show to promote and market its goods in high-profile settings. The show features some of the world's leading fashion models, such as current Victoria's Secret Angels Adriana Lima, Alessandra Ambrosio, Candice Swanepoel, Lily Aldridge, Lais Ribeiro, Elsa Hosk, Jasmine Tookes, Martha Hunt, Sara Sampaio, Stella Maxwell, Taylor Hill, Romee Strijd, and Josephine Skriver. Behati Prinsloo missed this year's show, once again, due to the birth of her second child. The show also featured PINK spokesmodels Grace Elizabeth and Zuri Tibby.

This was the last Victoria's Secret Fashion Show to be aired on CBS.

The Victoria's Secret Fashion Show 2017 was recorded in Shanghai, China at the Mercedes-Benz Arena, it was the first Victoria's Secret Fashion Show held in Asia. The show featured musical performances by Harry Styles, Miguel, Leslie Odom Jr., and Jane Zhang. Angel Lais Ribeiro was wearing the Victoria's Secret Fantasy Bra: The Champagne Nights Fantasy Bra worth $2,000,000.

Ambrosio announced her departure with the brand as an Angel right before the show, which is why the order of the first and last segments were swapped last minute to let her close the entire show. However, the TV version featured the fifth segment, Goddesses, as the last segment which made it look like as if Vanessa Moody seemingly closed the show.

Dates	Locations	Broadcaster	Viewers (millions)	Performers
November 20, 2017 (recorded); November 28, 2017	Shanghai, China	CBS	4.98	Harry Styles, Miguel, Leslie Odom Jr., Li Yundi, and Jane Zhang

== Fashion show segments ==
=== Segment 1: Punk Angels ===
Performer	Song	Status
(United Kingdom) Harry Styles	"Kiwi"	Live Performance

Nationality	Model	Wings	Runway Shows	Status
(South Africa) South African	Candice Swanepoel	꒰১ ໒꒱	2007–2015 • 2017–2018 • 2024–present	VS 4 Angel (2010–2021)
(Denmark) Danish	Josephine Skriver	꒰১ ໒꒱	2013–2018 • 2024	VS 5 Angel (2016–2021)
(Belgium) Belgian (United States) American	Stella Maxwell; Martha Hunt		2014–2018 • 2025; 2013–2018	VS 5 Angels (2015–2021)
(United Kingdom) British (Brazil) Brazilian	Aiden Curtiss; Daniela Braga		2017–2018; 2014–2017	
(Brazil) Brazilian (United States) American	Alessandra Ambrosio; Lily Aldridge		2000–2003 • 2005–2017 • 2024–present 2009–2017 • 2025	VS 2 Angel (2004–2017); VS 4 Angel (2010–2018)
(United States) American (France) French	Karlie Kloss; Cindy Bruna		2011–2014 • 2017; 2013–2018 • 2026	Former VS 4 Angel (2013–2015)
(Angola) Angolan (United Kingdom) British	Maria Borges; Alexina Graham		2013–2017; 2017–2018	
(Brazil) Brazilian	Adriana Lima	꒰১ ໒꒱	1999–2003 • 2005-2008 • 2010–2018 • 2024–present	VS 2 Angel (2000–2018)
(United Kingdom) British (China) Chinese	Leomie Anderson; Liu Wen		2015–2018; 2009–2012 • 2016–2018 • 2024–present	
(United States) American	Devon Windsor	꒰১ ໒꒱	2013–2018	
(United States) American (China) Chinese	Grace Elizabeth; Ming Xi		2016–2018 • 2024–present 2013–2018 • 2026	PINK Angel (2016–2019)
(Sweden) Swedish (Portugal) Portuguese	Elsa Hosk; Sara Sampaio		2011–2018 • 2026; 2013–2018	VS 5 Angels (2015–2021)
(Tanzania) Tanzanian (South Sudan) South Sudanese	Herieth Paul; Grace Bol		2016–2018; 2017–2018	
(United States) American	Jasmine Tookes	꒰১ ໒꒱	2012–2018 • 2024–present	VS 5 Angel (2015–2021)

=== Segment 2: Porcelain Angel ===
Performer(s)	Song	Status
(United States) Miguel	"Pineapple Skies "	Live Performance
(China) Li Yundi	"Pineapple Skies "	Live Performance

Nationality	Model	Wings	Runway Shows	Status
(Denmark) Danish	Josephine Skriver	꒰১ ໒꒱	2013–2018 • 2024	VS 5 Angel (2016–2021)
(Spain) Spanish	Blanca Padilla		2014 • 2017	
(Brazil) Brazilian	Barbara Fialho		2012–2018	
(United States) American	Bella Hadid	꒰১ ໒꒱	2016–2018 • 2024–present	
(Netherlands) Dutch	Roosmarijn de Kok		2017	
(New Zealand) New Zealander	Georgia Fowler	꒰১ ໒꒱	2016–2018	
(Sweden) Swedish	Kelly Gale	꒰১ ໒꒱	2013–2014 • 2016–2018	
(Norway) Norwegian	Frida Aasen		2017–2018	
(Belgium) Belgian	Stella Maxwell	꒰১ ໒꒱	2014–2018 • 2025	VS 5 Angel (2015–2021)
(Brazil) Brazilian	Daniela Braga		2014–2017	
(United Kingdom) British	Aiden Curtiss		2017–2018	
(United States) American	Lily Aldridge	꒰১ ໒꒱	2009–2017 • 2025	VS 4 Angel (2010–2018)

=== Segment 3: A Winter's Tale ===
Performer	Song	Status
(United States) Leslie Odom Jr.	"Winter Song"	Live Performance
(China) Li Yundi	"Winter Song"	Live Performance

Nationality	Model	Wings	Runway Show	Status
(Portugal) Portuguese	Sara Sampaio	꒰১ ໒꒱	2013–2018	VS 5 Angel (2015–2021)
(Austria) Austrian	Nadine Leopold		2017–2018	
(Brazil) Brazilian	Bruna Lirio		2015 • 2017	
(France) French	Estelle Chen		2017–2018	
(China) Chinese	Liu Wen	꒰১ ໒꒱	2009–2012 • 2016–2018 • 2024–present	
(United Kingdom) British	Alexina Graham		2017–2018	
(United States) American	Vanessa Moody		2017	
(China) Chinese	Ming Xi	꒰১ ໒꒱	2013–2018 • 2026	
(Brazil) Brazilian	Gizele Oliveira		2017–2018 • 2026	
(United States) American	Karlie Kloss	꒰১ ໒꒱	2011–2014 • 2017	Former VS 4 Angel (2013–2015)
(United States) American	Devon Windsor		2013–2018	
(United States) American	Martha Hunt	꒰১ ໒꒱	2013–2018	VS 5 Angel (2015–2019)

=== Segment 4: Millennial Nation (PINK) ===
Performer	Song	Status
(China) Jane Zhang	"Work For It"	Live Performance • Medley
(China) Jane Zhang	"808"	Live Performance • Medley
(China) Jane Zhang	"Dust My Shoulders Off"	Live Performance • Medley

Nationality	Model	Wings	Runway Show	Status
(United States) American	Grace Elizabeth	꒰১ ໒꒱	2016–2018 • 2024–present	PINK Angel (2016–2019)
(United States) American	Maggie Laine		2016–2018	
(United States) American	Dilone		2016–2017	
(China) Chinese	One Wang		2017	
(Brazil) Brazilian	Samile Bermannelli		2017	
(Belgium) Belgian	Leila Nda		2015 • 2017	
(United States) American	Lameka Fox		2016–2018	
(China) Chinese	Xiao Wen Ju		2016–2017 • 2025	
(Angola) Angolan	Amilna Estêvão		2017	
(United States) American	Alanna Arrington		2016–2018	
(China) Chinese	Xin Xie		2017	
(Australia) Australian	Victoria Lee		2017	
(Cape Verde) Cape Verdean	Alecia Morais		2017	
(Austria) Austrian	Nadine Leopold		2017–2018	
(United States) American	Zuri Tibby	꒰১ ໒꒱	2016–2018	PINK Angel (2016–2019)

=== Segment 5: Goddesses ===
This segment was swapped in order of appearance with the sixth segment, Nomadic Adventures, for the TV version.

Performer	Song	Status
(United Kingdom) Harry Styles	"Only Angel"	Live Performance

Nationality	Model	Wings	Runway Show	Status	Fantasy Bra	Value
(Netherlands) Dutch	Romee Strijd	꒰১ ໒꒱	2014–2018	VS 5 Angels (2015–2021)		
(Brazil) Brazilian	Lais Ribeiro	꒰১ ໒꒱	2010–2011 • 2013–2018	VS 5 Angels (2015–2021)	Champagne Nights Fantasy Bra by Mouawad	$2,000,000
(United States) American	Taylor Hill		2014–2018 • 2024	VS 5 Angels (2015–2021)		
(China) Chinese	Sui He	꒰১ ໒꒱	2011–2018			
(Brazil) Brazilian	Barbara Fialho	꒰১ ໒꒱	2012–2018			
(United Kingdom) British	Megan Williams	꒰১ ໒꒱	2016–2018			
(United States) American	Bella Hadid		2016–2018 • 2024–present			
(Netherlands) Dutch	Sanne Vloet	꒰১ ໒꒱	2015–2017			
(Spain) Spanish	Blanca Padilla	꒰১ ໒꒱	2014 • 2017			
(United States) American	Jourdana Phillips	꒰১ ໒꒱	2016–2018			
(United States) American	Dilone		2016–2017			
(United States) American	Vanessa Moody	꒰১ ໒꒱	2017			

=== Segment 6: Nomadic Adventures ===
This segment was swapped in order of appearance with the fifth segment, Goddesses, for the TV version.

Performer	Song	Status
(United States) Miguel	"Told You So"	Live Performance

Nationality	Model	Wings	Runway Show	Status	Swarovski Outfit	Price
(Brazil) Brazilian	Adriana Lima	꒰১ ໒꒱	1999–2003 • 2005–2008 • 2010–18 • 2024–present	VS 2 Angel (2000–2018)		
(United States) American	Jasmine Tookes	꒰১ ໒꒱	2012–2018 • 2024–present	VS 5 Angel (2015–2021)		
(South Sudan) South Sudanese	Grace Bol	꒰১ ໒꒱	2017–2018			
(Angola) Angolan	Amilna Estevão		2017			
(South Africa) South African	Candice Swanepoel	꒰১ ໒꒱	2007–2015 • 2017–2018 • 2024–present	VS 4 Angel (2010–2021)		
(United Kingdom) British	Leomie Anderson	꒰১ ໒꒱	2015–2018			
(Sweden) Swedish	Elsa Hosk	˚₊‧꒰ა ໒꒱ ‧₊˚	2011–2018 • 2026	VS 5 Angel (2015–2020)	Million Dollar Swarovski Outfit	$1,000,000
(France) French	Cindy Bruna	꒰১ ໒꒱	2013–2018 • 2026			
(Angola) Angolan	Maria Borges	꒰১ ໒꒱	2013–2017			
(Netherlands) Dutch	Romee Strijd	꒰১ ໒꒱	2014–2018	VS 5 Angels (2015–2021)		
(Brazil) Brazilian	Lais Ribeiro		2010–2011 • 2013–2018	VS 5 Angels (2015–2021)		
(United States) American	Taylor Hill	꒰১ ໒꒱	2014–2018 • 2024	VS 5 Angels (2015–2021)		
(China) Chinese	Sui He	꒰১ ໒꒱	2011–2018			
(Brazil) Brazilian	Alessandra Ambrosio	˚₊‧꒰ა ໒꒱ ‧₊˚	2000–2003 • 2005–2017 • 2024–present	VS 2 Angel (2004–2017)		

== Finale ==
Performer	Song	Status
(Australia) Catcall	"The World Is Ours"	Recording

Model	Runway shows	Status	Model	Runway shows	Status
(Brazil) Alessandra Ambrosio	2000–2003 • 2005–2017 • 2024–present	VS 2 Angel (2004–2017)	(Brazil) Adriana Lima	1999–2003 • 2005–2008 • 2010–2018 • 2024–present	VS 2 Angel (2000–2018)
(United States) Lily Aldridge	2009–2017 • 2025	VS 4 Angel (2010–2018)	(South Africa) Candice Swanepoel	2007–2015 • 2017–2018 • 2024–present	VS 4 Angel (2010–2021)
(Sweden) Elsa Hosk	2011–2018 • 2026	VS 5 Angel (2015–2020)	(Netherlands) Romee Strijd	2014–2018	VS 5 Angels (2015–2021)
(Denmark) Josephine Skriver	2013–2018 • 2024	VS 5 Angel (2016–2021)	(United States) Jasmine Tookes	2012–2018 • 2024–present	VS 5 Angels (2015–2021)
(Belgium) Stella Maxwell	2014–2018 • 2025	VS 5 Angels (2015–2021)	(United States) Taylor Hill	2014–2018 • 2024	VS 5 Angels (2015–2021)
(United States) Martha Hunt	2013–2018	VS 5 Angels (2015–2021)	(Brazil) Lais Ribeiro	2010–2011 • 2013–2018	VS 5 Angels (2015–2021)
(Portugal) Sara Sampaio	2013–2018	VS 5 Angels (2015–2021)	(United States) Bella Hadid	2016–2018 • 2024–present	
(United States) Grace Elizabeth	2016–2018 • 2024–present	PINK Angel (2016–2019)	(United States) Zuri Tibby	2016–2018	PINK Angel (2016–2019)
(China) Liu Wen	2009–2012 • 2016–2018 • 2024–present		(China) Sui He	2011–2018	
(United States) Karlie Kloss	2011–2014 • 2017	Former VS 4 Angel (2013–2015)	(France) Cindy Bruna	2013–2018 • 2026	
(China) Ming Xi	2013–2018 • 2026		(United States) Devon Windsor	2013–2018	
(Netherlands) Sanne Vloet	2015–2017		(Spain) Blanca Padilla	2014 • 2017	
(New Zealand) Georgia Fowler	2016–18		(Sweden) Kelly Gale	2013–2014 • 2016–2018	
(Angola) Maria Borges	2013–2017		(United States) Vanessa Moody	2017	
(United States) Dilone	2016–2018		(United States) Maggie Laine	2016–2018	
(South Sudan) Grace Bol	2017–2018		(United States) Jourdana Phillips	2016–2018	
(United Kingdom) Aiden Curtiss	2017–2018		(United Kingdom) Alexina Graham	2017–2018	
(Brazil) Daniela Braga	2014–2017		(Austria) Nadine Leopold	2017–2018	
(United Kingdom) Leomie Anderson	2015–2018		(Brazil) Barbara Fialho	2012–2018	
(United Kingdom) Megan Williams	2016–2018		(Brazil) Gizele Oliveira	2017–2018 • 2026	
(Tanzania) Herieth Paul	2016–2018		(United States) Alanna Arrington	2016–2018	
(Netherlands) Roosmarijn de Kok	2017		(Brazil) Bruna Lirio	2015 • 2017	
(United States) Lameka Fox	2016–2018		(Brazil) Samile Bermannelli	2017	
(Angola) Amilna Estevão	2017	✿	(China) Xiao Wen Ju	2016–2017 • 2025	
(Belgium) Leila Nda	2015 • 2017	ʚĭɞ	(Australia) Victoria Lee	2017	
			(France) Estelle Chen	2017–2018	
			(China) Xin Xie	2017	
			(China) One Wang	2017	

== Index ==
Symbol	Meaning
VS 2	2nd Generation Angels
VS 4	4th Generation Angels
VS 5	5th Generation Angels
VS C	Chinese Angels
PINK	PINK Angels
꒰১ ໒꒱	Wings
˚₊‧꒰ა ໒꒱ ‧₊˚	Swarovski Wing
