= Victoria's Secret Fashion Show 2018 =

Annual fashion show of a US lingerie brand

- Status: Active
- Genre: Fashion show
- Date: November 8, 2018
- Frequency: Annually
- Venue: Pier 94
- Location: New York City
- Years active: 1995–2003, 2005–2018, 2024–present
- Inaugurated: August 1, 1995
- Most recent: 2026
- Previous event: 2017
- Next event: 2024
- Member: Victoria's Secret
- Website: Victoria's Secret Fashion Show

The Victoria's Secret Fashion Show is an annual fashion show sponsored by Victoria's Secret, an American brand of lingerie and sleepwear. Victoria's Secret uses the show to promote and market its goods in high-profile settings. The show featured some of the world's leading fashion models, such as Victoria's Secret Angels, Lais Ribeiro, Elsa Hosk, Jasmine Tookes, Martha Hunt, Sara Sampaio, Stella Maxwell, Taylor Hill, Romee Strijd, Josephine Skriver, also with head angels Adriana Lima, Candice Swanepoel and Behati Prinsloo making her comeback in two years. The show also featured PINK angels, Grace Elizabeth and Zuri Tibby, also with Chinese angels, Sui He and Ming Xi. Lily Aldridge was also absent due to her pregnancy.

The 2018 Victoria's Secret Fashion Show was recorded in New York City at the Pier 94, on November 8. The show featured musical performances by Shawn Mendes, Rita Ora, The Chainsmokers, Bebe Rexha, Halsey, Leela James, Kelsea Ballerini, and The Struts. The show featured seven main segments, along with a segment paying tribute to Adriana Lima, marking her retirement from modeling for Victoria's Secret.

This was the last annual Victoria's Secret Fashion Show, until its relaunch in 2024, with different images and presentation.

ABC aired the show's television special, The Victoria’s Secret Fashion Show Holiday Special, on December 2, 2018.

Dates	Locations	Broadcaster	Viewers (millions)	Performers
November 8, 2018 (recorded); December 2, 2018 (aired)	New York City	ABC	3.27	Shawn Mendes, Rita Ora, The Chainsmokers, Bebe Rexha, Halsey, Leela James, Kelsea Ballerini, and The Struts

== Fashion show segments ==
=== Segment 1: Glam Royale ===
Performer	Song	Status
(United States) Leela James	"This is Me"	Cover Live Performance

Nationality	Model	Wings	Runway Shows	Status
(United States) American	Taylor Hill	꒰১ ໒꒱	2014–2018 • 2024	VS 5 Angel (2015–2020)
(United Kingdom) British	Alexina Graham		2017–2018	
(Denmark) Danish	Josephine Skriver	꒰১ ໒꒱	2013–2018 • 2024	VS 5 Angel (2016–2021)
(United States) American	Gigi Hadid		2015–2016 • 2018 • 2024–present	
(Portugal) Portuguese	Sara Sampaio	꒰১ ໒꒱	2013–2018	VS 5 Angel (2015–2021)
(United Kingdom) British	Aiden Curtiss		2017–2018	
(Brazil) Brazilian	Lais Ribeiro	꒰১ ໒꒱	2010–2011 • 2013–2018	VS 5 Angel (2015–2021)
(China) Chinese	Liu Wen	꒰১ ໒꒱	2009–2012 • 2016–2018 • 2024–present	
(United States) American	Lameka Fox		2016–2018	
(United States) American	Kendall Jenner		2015–2016 • 2018	
(France) French	Cindy Bruna	꒰১ ໒꒱	2013–2018 • 2026	
(Netherlands) Dutch	Yasmin Wijnaldum		2018 • 2025–present	
(Namibia) Namibian	Behati Prinsloo	꒰১ ໒꒱	2007–2015 • 2018 • 2024–present	VS 3 Angel (2009–2019)

=== Segment 2: Golden Angels ===
Performer(s)	Song	Status
(United States) The Chainsmokers	"This Feeling"	Live Performance
(United States) Kelsea Ballerini	"This Feeling"	Live Performance

Nationality	Model	Wings	Runway Shows	Status
(South Africa) South African	Candice Swanepoel	꒰১ ໒꒱	2007–2015 • 2017–2018 • 2024–present	VS 4 Angel (2010–2021)
(Australia) Australian	Shanina Shaik		2011–2012 • 2014–2015 • 2018	
(United States) American	Jasmine Tookes	꒰১ ໒꒱	2012–2018 • 2024–present	VS 5 Angel (2015–2021)
(United States) American	Jourdana Phillips		2016–2018	
(United States) American	Grace Elizabeth		2016–2018 • 2024–present	PINK Angel (2016–2019)
(Brazil) Brazilian	Barbara Fialho		2012–2018	
(United States) American	Sofie Rovenstine		2018	
(Belgium) Belgian	Stella Maxwell	꒰১ ໒꒱	2014–2018 • 2025	VS 5 Angel (2015–2021)
(Hungary) Hungarian	Barbara Palvin		2012 • 2018 • 2024–present	
(China) Chinese	Ming Xi	꒰১ ໒꒱	2013–2018 • 2026	VS C Angel (2018–2019)
(Germany) German	Lorena Rae		2018	✿
(Tanzania) Tanzanian	Herieth Paul		2016–2018	
(Netherlands) Dutch	Romee Strijd	꒰১ ໒꒱	2014–2018	VS 5 Angel (2015–2021)

=== Special Segment: Thank You Adriana ===
Performer	Song	Status
(United Kingdom) Hannah Grace	"Praise You"	Recording

Nationality	Model	Wings	Runway Show	Status
(Brazil) Brazilian	Adriana Lima	꒰১ ໒꒱	1999–2003 • 2005–2008 • 2010–2018 • 2024–present	VS 2 Angel (2000–2018)

=== Segment 3: Flights of Fancy ===
Performer	Song	Status
(United States) Halsey	"Without Me"	Live Performance

Nationality	Model	Wings	Runway Show	Status	Fantasy Bra	Price
(United States) American	Martha Hunt	꒰১ ໒꒱	2013–2018	VS 5 Angel (2015–2019)		
(Norway) Norwegian	Frida Aasen		2017–2018			
(Sweden) Swedish	Kelly Gale	꒰১ ໒꒱	2013–2014 • 2016–2018			
(Canada) Canadian	Winnie Harlow		2018			
(Germany) German	Toni Garrn	꒰১ ໒꒱	2011–2013 • 2018			
(United Kingdom) British	Megan Williams		2016–2018			
(United States) American	Alanna Arrington	꒰১ ໒꒱	2016–2018			
(United States) American	Devon Windsor	꒰১ ໒꒱	2013–2018			
(United States) American	Bella Hadid	꒰১ ໒꒱	2016–2018 • 2024–present			
(Brazil) Brazilian	Gizele Oliveira	꒰১ ໒꒱	2017–2018 • 2026			
(Sweden) Swedish	Elsa Hosk	꒰১ ໒꒱	2011–2018 • 2026	VS 5 Angel (2015–2020)	Dream Angels Fantasy Bra by Atelier Swarovski	$1,000,000

=== Segment 4: PINK ===
Performer	Song	Status
(United States) Bebe Rexha	"I'm a Mess"	Live Performance

Nationality	Model	Runway Show	Status
(United States) American	Grace Elizabeth	2016–2018 • 2024–present	PINK Angel (2016–2019)
(United States) American	Josie Canseco	2018	
(New Zealand) New Zealander	Maia Cotton	2018	
(Philippines) Filipino	Kelsey Merritt	2018	
(United States) American	Iesha Hodges	2018	
(Ivory Coast) Ivorian	Melie Tiacoh	2018	
(Portugal) Portuguese	Isilda Moreira	2018	
(Australia) Australian	Alannah Walton	2018	
(France) French	Estelle Chen	2017–2018	
(United States) American	Zuri Tibby	2016–2018	PINK Angel (2016–2019)
(United States) American	Willow Hand	2018	
(Netherlands) Dutch	Myrthe Bolt	2018	
(United States) American	Maggie Laine	2016–2018	

=== Segment 5: Floral Fantasy ===
Performer	Song	Status
(Canada) Shawn Mendes	"Lost in Japan"	Live Performance

Nationality	Model	Wings	Runway Shows	Status
(United States) American	Jasmine Tookes	꒰১ ໒꒱	2012–2018 • 2024–present	VS 5 Angel (2015–2021)
(United States) American	Devon Windsor		2013–2018	
(Netherlands) Dutch	Yasmin Wijnaldum		2018 • 2025–present	
(United States) American	Gigi Hadid	꒰১ ໒꒱	2015–2016 • 2018 • 2024–present	
(Austria) Austrian	Nadine Leopold		2017–2018	
(United States) American	Sofie Rovenstine		2018	
(Canada) Canadian	Winnie Harlow		2018	
(United Kingdom) British	Aiden Curtiss		2017–2018	
(Nigeria) Nigerian	Mayowa Nicholas		2018 • 2024	
(United Kingdom) British	Alexina Graham	꒰১ ໒꒱	2017–2018	
(China) Chinese	Liu Wen		2009–2012 • 2016–2018 • 2024–present	
(Australia) Australian	Duckie Thot		2018	
(China) Chinese	Sui He		2011–2018	VS C Angel (2018–2019)
(United Kingdom) British	Leomie Anderson		2015–2018	
(Denmark) Danish	Josephine Skriver	꒰১ ໒꒱	2013–2018 • 2024	VS 5 Angel (2016–2021)

=== Segment 6: Downtown Angel ===
Performer	Song	Status
(Kosovo) Rita Ora	"Let You Love Me"	Live Performance

Nationality	Model	Wings	Runway Shows	Status
(Belgium) Belgian	Stella Maxwell		2014–2018 • 2025	VS 5 Angel (2015–2021)
(Namibia) Namibian	Behati Prinsloo		2007–2015 • 2018 • 2024–present	VS 3 Angel (2009–2019)
(New Zealand) New Zealander	Georgia Fowler		2016–2018	
(United States) American	Lameka Fox		2016–2018	
(South Sudan) South Sudanese	Subah Koj		2018	
(United Kingdom) British	Cheyenne Carty		2018	
(China) Chinese	Ming Xi		2013–2018 • 2026	VS C Angel (2018–2019)
(United States) American	Bella Hadid		2016–2018 • 2024–present	
(Sweden) Swedish	Kelly Gale		2013–2014 • 2016–2018	
(Hungary) Hungarian	Barbara Palvin		2012 • 2018 • 2024–present	
(United Kingdom) British	Sadie Newman		2018	
(United States) American	Martha Hunt	꒰১ ໒꒱	2013–2018	VS 5 Angel (2015–2019)

=== Segment 7: Celestial Angel ===
Performer	Song	Status
(United Kingdom) The Struts	"Body Talks"	Live Performance

Nationality	Model	Wings	Runway Shows	Status	Swarovski Outfit	Price
(Brazil) Brazilian	Lais Ribeiro	꒰১ ໒꒱	2010–2011 • 2013–2018	VS 5 Angel (2015–2021)		
(South Africa) South African	Candice Swanepoel	꒰১ ໒꒱	2007–2015 • 2017–2018 • 2024–present	VS 4 Angel (2010–2021)		
(United States) American	Taylor Hill		2014–2018 • 2024	VS 5 Angel (2015–2020)		
(Netherlands) Dutch	Romee Strijd	˚₊‧꒰ა ໒꒱ ‧₊˚	2014–2018	VS 5 Angel (2015–2020)	Shooting Star; Swarovski Outfit	–
(Sweden) Swedish	Elsa Hosk	꒰১ ໒꒱	2011–2018 • 2026	VS 5 Angel (2015–2020)		
(Brazil) Brazilian	Barbara Fialho	꒰১ ໒꒱	2012–2018			
(United States) American	Jourdana Phillips		2016–2018			
(United States) American	Kendall Jenner	꒰১ ໒꒱	2015–2016 • 2018			
(South Sudan) South Sudanese	Grace Bol	꒰১ ໒꒱	2017–2018			
(Portugal) Portuguese	Sara Sampaio	꒰১ ໒꒱	2013–2018	VS 5 Angel (2015–2021)		
(France) French	Cindy Bruna	꒰১ ໒꒱	2013–2018 • 2026			
(China) Chinese	Sui He	꒰১ ໒꒱	2011–2018	VS C Angel (2018–2019)		
(Brazil) Brazilian	Adriana Lima	˚₊‧꒰ა ໒꒱ ‧₊˚	1999–2003 • 2005–2008 • 2010–2018 2024–present	VS 2 Angel (2000–2018)		

== Finale ==
Performer	Song	Status
(United Kingdom) The Struts	"In Love with a Camera"	Live Performance

Model	(Philippines) Kelsey Merritt	(New Zealand) Maia Cotton	(United States) Willow Hand	(United States) Iesha Hodges	(Netherlands) Myrthe Bolt	(Ivory Coast) Melie Tiacoh
Runway Shows	2018					
Status	✿					

Model	(United States) Maggie Laine	(United States) Zuri Tibby	(United States) Josie Canseco	(Australia) Alannah Walton	(France) Estelle Chen	(Portugal) Isilda Moreira
Runway Shows	2016–2018		2018		2017–2018	2018
Status		PINK Angel (2016–2019)				

Model	(United Kingdom) Cheyenne Carty	(United States) Sofie Rovenstine	(United Kingdom) Sadie Newman	(South Sudan) Subah Koj	(New Zealand) Georgia Fowler	(Nigeria) Mayowa Nicholas
Runway Shows	2018				2016–2018	2018 • 2024
Status						

Model	(Germany) Lorena Rae	(Australia) Duckie Thot	(Norway) Frida Aasen	(United Kingdom) Leomie Anderson	(United States) Alanna Arrington	(Sweden) Kelly Gale
Runway Shows	2018		2017–2018	2015–2018	2016–2018	2013–2014 • 2016–2018
Status						

Model	(Austria) Nadine Leopold	(Australia) Shanina Shaik	(Tanzania) Herieth Paul	(Brazil) Barbara Fialho	(Germany) Toni Garrn	(United Kingdom) Aiden Curtiss
Runway Shows	2017–2018	2011–2012 • 2014–2015 • 2018	2016–2018	2012–2018	2011–2013 • 2018	2017–2018
Status						

Model	(United States) Jourdana Phillips	(United Kingdom) Megan Williams	(South Sudan) Grace Bol	(United States) Devon Windsor	(China) Liu Wen	(Brazil) Gizele Oliveira
Runway Shows	2016–2018		2017–2018	2013–2018	2009–2012 • 2016–2018 • 2024–present	2017–2018
Status						

Model	(Netherlands) Yasmin Wijnaldum	(Hungary) Barbara Palvin	(Canada) Winnie Harlow	(China) Sui He	(United States) Bella Hadid	(United States) Lameka Fox
Runway Shows	2018 • 2025–present	2012 • 2018 • 2024–present	2018	2011–2018	2016–2018 • 2024–present	2016–2018
Status				VS C Angel (2018–2021)		

Model	(China) Ming Xi	(United States) Grace Elizabeth	(France) Cindy Bruna	(United States) Gigi Hadid	(United States) Kendall Jenner	(United Kingdom) Alexina Graham
Runway Shows	2013–2018 • 2026	2016–2018 • 2024–present	2013–2018 • 2026	2015–2016 • 2018 • 2024–present	2015–2016 • 2018	2017–2018
Status	VS C Angel (2018–2021)	PINK Angel (2016–2019)				

Model	(United States) Martha Hunt	(Brazil) Lais Ribeiro	(Denmark) Josephine Skriver	(Portugal) Sara Sampaio	(Belgium) Stella Maxwell	(Netherlands) Romee Strijd
Runway Shows	2013–2018	2010–2011 • 2013–2018	2013–2018 • 2024	2013–2018	2014-2018 • 2025	2014–2018
Status	VS 5 Angels (2015–21)		VS 5 Angel (2016–21)	VS 5 Angels (2015–2021)		

Model	(United States) Taylor Hill	(United States) Jasmine Tookes	(Sweden) Elsa Hosk	(Brazil) Adriana Lima	(Namibia) Behati Prinsloo	(South Africa) Candice Swanepoel
Runway Shows	2014–2018 • 2024	2012–2018 • 2024–present	2011–2018 • 2026	1999–2003 • 2005–2008 • 2010–2018 • 2024–present	2007–2015 • 2018 • 2024–present	2007–2015 • 2017–2018 • 2024–present
Status	VS 5 Angels (2015–2021)			VS 2 Angel (2000–2018)	VS 3 Angel (2009–2021)	VS 4 Angel (2010–2021)

== Index ==
Symbol	Meaning
VS 2	2nd Generation Angels
VS 3	3rd Generation Angels
VS 4	4th Generation Angels
VS 5	5th Generation Angels
VS C	Chinese Angels
PINK	PINK Angels
꒰১ ໒꒱	Wings
˚₊‧꒰ა ໒꒱ ‧₊˚	Swarovski Wing
