= Victoria's Secret Fashion Show 2014 =

US lingerie brand fashion show

- Status: Active
- Genre: Fashion show
- Date: December 2, 2014
- Frequency: Annually
- Venue: Earls Court
- Locations: London, England, United Kingdom
- Years active: 1995–2003, 2005–2018, 2024–present
- Inaugurated: August 1, 1995
- Most recent: 2026
- Previous event: 2013
- Next event: 2015
- Member: Victoria's Secret
- Website: Victoria's Secret Fashion Show

Victoria's Secret Angels 2014
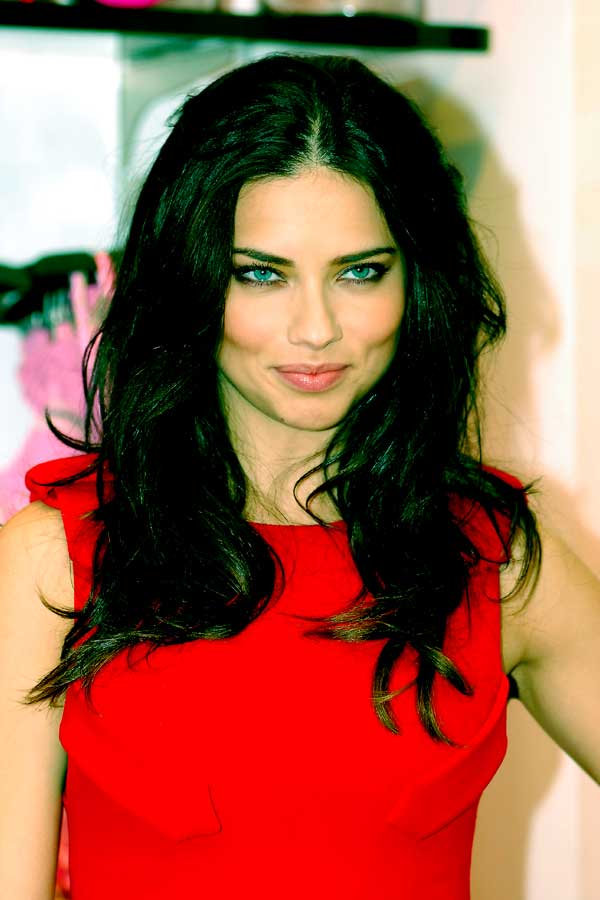
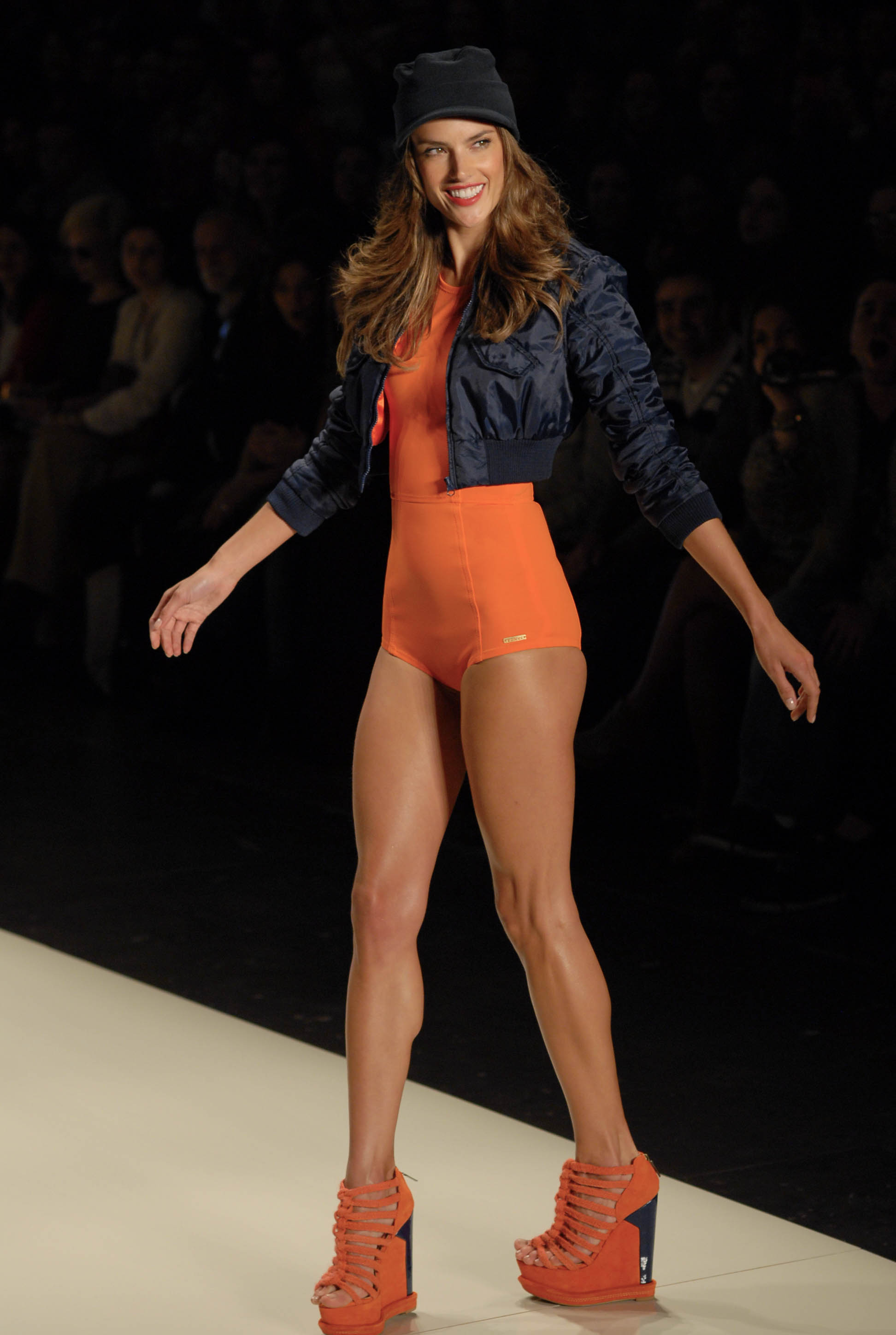
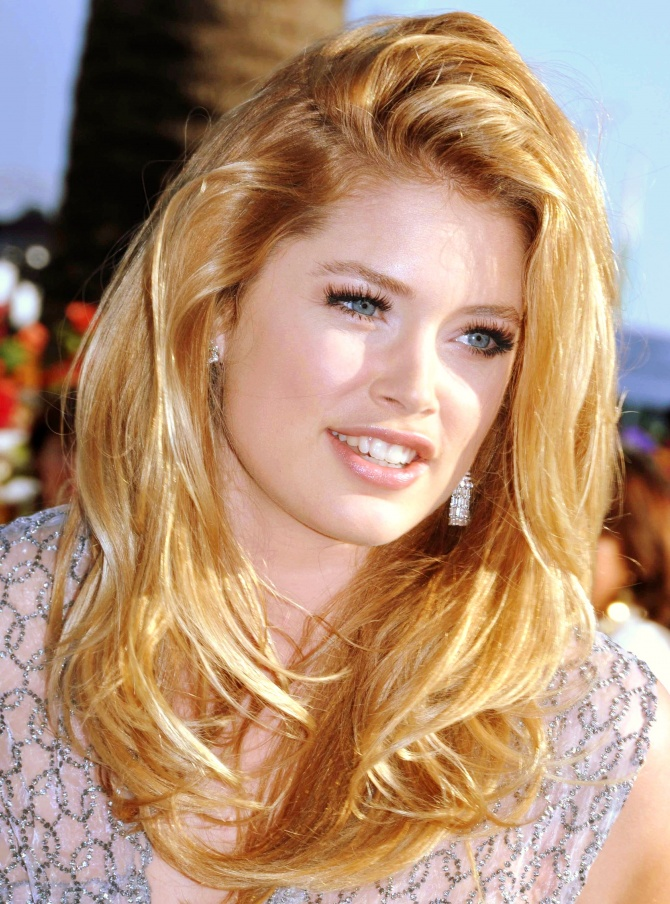
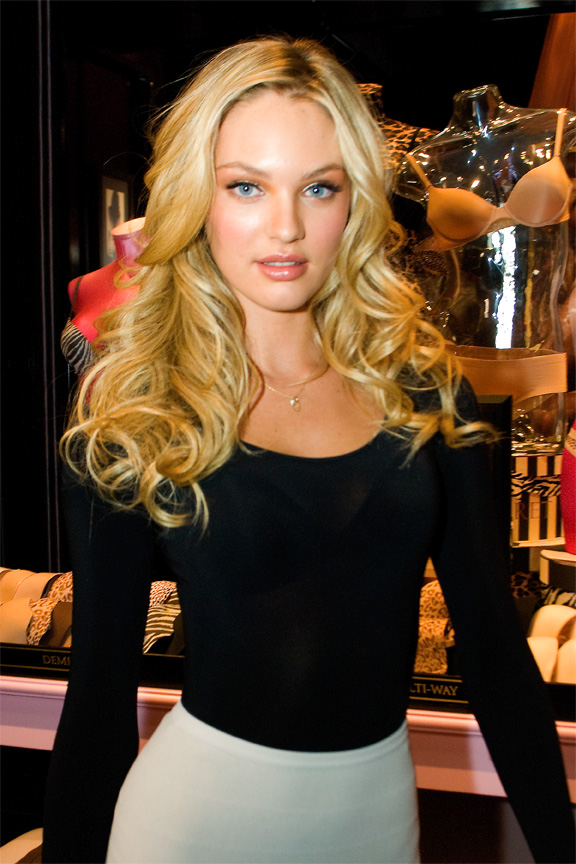
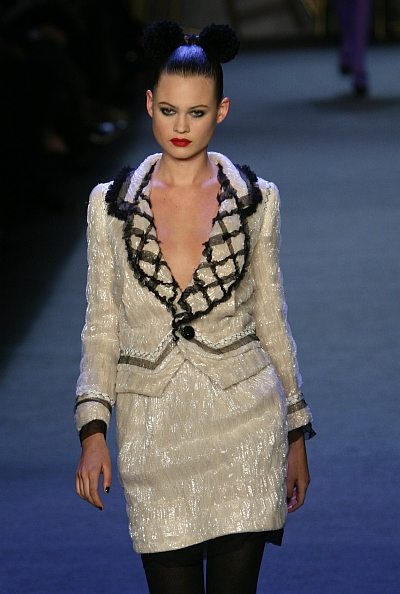
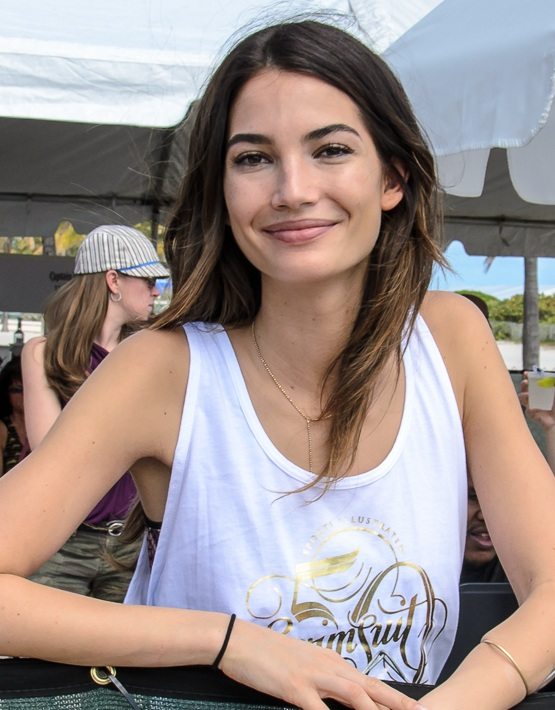
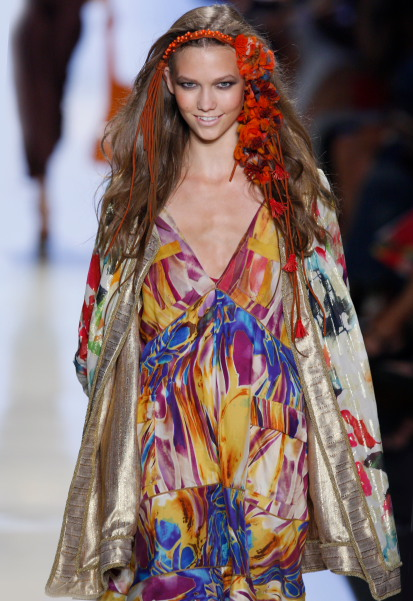

The Victoria's Secret Fashion Show is an annual fashion show sponsored by Victoria's Secret, a brand of lingerie and sleepwear. Victoria's Secret uses the show to promote and market its goods in high-profile settings. The show features some of the world's leading fashion models, such as current Victoria's Secret Angels Adriana Lima, Alessandra Ambrosio, Behati Prinsloo, Candice Swanepoel, Doutzen Kroes, Lily Aldridge and Karlie Kloss. Lindsay Ellingson, Lais Ribeiro, Elsa Hosk, Jasmine Tookes, Martha Hunt, and Stella Maxwell all received billing.

The show featured musical performances by Taylor Swift, Ed Sheeran, Ariana Grande, and Hozier.

For the first time, there were not one but two fantasy bras, the Dream Angels Fantasy Bras. They were worn by Alessandra Ambrosio (her second) and Adriana Lima (her third) and worth US$2,000,000 each.

Dates	Locations	Broadcaster	Viewers (millions)	Performers
December 2, 2014 (recorded); December 9, 2014	London	CBS	9.29; 1.24	Ed Sheeran, Ariana Grande, Hozier, and Taylor Swift

== Fashion show segments ==
=== Segment 1: Gilded Angels ===
Performer	Song	Status
(United States) Afrika Bambaataa	"Just Get Up and Dance (Acapella)"	Remixed Recording
(United States) Bob Seger	"Hollywood Nights"	Remixed Recording
(United Kingdom) T. Rex	"Get It On"	Remixed Recording
(United Kingdom) Transvision Vamp	"I Want Your Love"	Remixed Recording

Nationality	Model	Wings	Runway shows	Status
(Namibia) Namibian	Behati Prinsloo	꒰১ ໒꒱	2007–2015 • 2018 • 2024–present	VS 3 Angel (2009–2019)
(United States) American	Karlie Kloss	꒰১ ໒꒱	2011–2014 • 2017	VS 4 Angel (2013–2015)
(South Africa) South African	Candice Swanepoel	꒰১ ໒꒱	2007–15 • 2017–2018 • 2024–present	VS 4 Angel (2010–2021)
(United States) American	Lily Aldridge		2009–2017 • 2025	VS 4 Angel (2010–2021)
(United Kingdom) British	Lily Donaldson	꒰১ ໒꒱	2010–2016	
(France) French	Cindy Bruna	꒰১ ໒꒱	2013–2018 • 2026	
(China) Chinese	Sui He		2011–2018	
(Netherlands) Dutch	Doutzen Kroes	꒰১ ໒꒱	2005–2006 • 2008–2009 • 2011–2014 • 2024–present	VS 3 Angel (2008–2014)
(France) French	Constance Jablonski	꒰১ ໒꒱	2010–2015	
(United States) American	Devon Windsor	꒰১ ໒꒱	2013–2018	
(United States) American	Lindsay Ellingson	꒰১ ໒꒱	2007–2014	★ Former VS 4 Angel (2011–2014)

=== Segment 2: Exotic Traveler ===
This segment was swapped in order of appearance with the third segment, Dream girls, for the TV version.

Performer	Song	Status
(United Kingdom) Ed Sheeran	"Thinking Out Loud"	Live Performance

Nationality	Model	Wings	Runway shows	Status	Fantasy Bra	Value
(Brazil) Brazilian	Adriana Lima; Alessandra Ambrosio		1999–2003 • 2005–2008 • 2010–2018 • 2024–present 2000–2003 • 2005–2017 • 2024–present	VS 2 Angel (2000–2018); VS 2 Angel (2004–2017)	Dream Angels Fantasy Bra by Mouawad	$2,000,000 ea
(Russia) Russian	Kate Grigorieva		2014–2016			
(Brazil) Brazilian	Isabeli Fontana		2003 • 2005 • 2007–2010 • 2012 • 2014 • 2024			
(Brazil) Brazilian	Izabel Goulart		2005–2016	Former VS 3 Angel (2005–2008)		
(United Kingdom) British	Jourdan Dunn		2012–2014			
(Hungary) Hungarian	Enikő Mihalik		2009 • 2014			
(Sweden) Swedish	Kelly Gale		2013–2014 • 2016–2018			
(Puerto Rico) Puerto Rican	Joan Smalls	꒰১ ໒꒱	2011–2016 • 2024–present			
(Brazil) Brazilian	Barbara Fialho		2012–2018			
(Australia) Australian	Shanina Shaik		2011–2012 • 2014–2015 • 2018			
(United States) American	Jasmine Tookes		2012–2018 • 2024–present	★		
(Brazil) Brazilians	Daniela Braga		2014–2017			
(Brazil) Brazilians	Lais Ribeiro		2010–2011 • 2013–2018	★		

=== Segment 3: Dream Girls ===
This segment was swapped in order of appearance with the second segment, Exotic Traveler, for the TV version.

Performer	Song	Status
(United States) Taylor Swift	"Blank Space"	Live Performance

Nationality	Model	Wings	Runway shows	Status
(United States) American	Lily Aldridge	꒰১ ໒꒱	2009–2017 • 2025	VS 4 Angel (2010–2018)
(Portugal) Portuguese	Sara Sampaio	꒰১ ໒꒱	2013–2018	
(Angola) Angolan	Maria Borges		2013–2017	
(Netherlands) Dutch	Romee Strijd		2014–2018	
(Belgium) Belgian	Stella Maxwell	꒰১ ໒꒱	2014–2018 • 2025	★
(Poland) Polish	Magdalena Frackowiak		2010 • 2012–2015	
(United States) American	Martha Hunt	꒰১ ໒꒱	2013–2018	★
(Russia) Russian	Irina Sharipova		2014	
(Poland) Polish	Kasia Struss		2013–2014	
(France) French	Sigrid Agren		2013–2014	
(Spain) Spanish	Blanca Padilla		2014 • 2017	
(Netherlands) Dutch	Doutzen Kroes		2005–2006 • 2008–2009 • 2011–2014 • 2024–present	VS 3 Angel (2008–2014)
(United States) American	Karlie Kloss	꒰১ ໒꒱	2011–2014 • 2017	VS 4 Angel (2013–2015)

=== Segment 4: University of PINK ===
Performer	Song	Status
(United States) Ariana Grande	"Love Me Harder" • "Bang Bang" • "Break Free" • "Problem"	Live Performance • Medley

Nationality	Model	Wings	Runway shows	Status
(Sweden) Swedish	Elsa Hosk	꒰১ ໒꒱	2011–2018 • 2026	★ PINK Angel (2011–2014)
(United States) American	Jacquelyn Jablonski		2010–2015	
(Canada) Canadian	Grace Mahary		2014	
(Latvia) Latvian	Ieva Laguna		2011–2014	
(Denmark) Danish	Josephine Skriver		2013–2018 • 2024	
(Belgium) Belgian	Yumi Lambert		2014–2015	
(Netherlands) Dutch	Bregje Heinen		2011–2012 • 2014	
(United States) American	Taylor Hill		2014–2018 • 2024	
(Netherlands) Dutch	Imaan Hammam		2014 • 2024–present	
(Portugal) Portuguese	Sara Sampaio		2013–2018	
(China) Chinese	Ming Xi		2013–2018 • 2026	
(Netherlands) Dutch	Maud Welzen		2012 • 2014–2015	
(Poland) Polish	Jac Jagaciak		2013–2015	

=== Segment 5: Fairy Tale ===
Performer	Song	Status
(Republic of Ireland) Hozier	"Take Me to Church"	Live Performance

Nationality	Model	Wings	Runway shows	Status	Swarovski Outfit	Price
(South Africa) South African	Candice Swanepoel	꒰১ ໒꒱	2007–2015 • 2017–2018 • 2024–present	VS 4 Angel (2010–2021)		
(Namibia) Namibian	Behati Prinsloo		2007–15 • 2018 • 2024–present	VS 3 Angel (2009–2019)		
(United States) American	Jasmine Tookes	꒰১ ໒꒱	2012–2018 • 2024–present	★		
(Hungary) Hungarian	Enikő Mihalik	꒰১ ໒꒱	2009 • 2014			
(United States) American	Lindsay Ellingson	꒰১ ໒꒱	2007–2014	★ Former VS 4 Angel (2011–2014)		
(China) Chinese	Sui He		2011–2018			
(Belgium) Belgian	Stella Maxwell	꒰১ ໒꒱	2014–2018 • 2025	★		
(United Kingdom) British	Lily Donaldson	˚₊‧꒰ა ໒꒱ ‧₊˚	2010–2016		The Swarovski Look Outfit	–
(Brazil) Brazilian	Barbara Fialho	꒰১ ໒꒱	2012–2018			
(United States) American	Devon Windsor	꒰১ ໒꒱	2013–2018			
(United Kingdom) British	Jourdan Dunn	꒰১ ໒꒱	2012–2014			
(Sweden) Swedish	Elsa Hosk	꒰১ ໒꒱	2011–2018 • 2026	★ PINK Angel (2011–2014)		
(Brazil) Brazilian	Izabel Goulart	꒰১ ໒꒱	2005–2016	Former VS 3 Angel (2005–2008)		

=== Segment 6: Angel Ball ===
Performer	Song	Status
(United States) Taylor Swift	"Style"	Live Performance

Nationality	Model	Wings	Runway shows	Status
(United States) American	Karlie Kloss		2011–2014 • 2017	VS 4 Angel (2013–2015)
(Puerto Rico) Puerto Rican	Joan Smalls	꒰১ ໒꒱	2011–2016 • 2024–present	
(Russia) Russian	Kate Grigorieva	꒰১ ໒꒱	2014–2016	
(Brazil) Brazilian	Lais Ribeiro	꒰১ ໒꒱	2010–2011 • 2013–2018	★
(Brazil) Brazilian	Isabeli Fontana	꒰১ ໒꒱	2003 • 2005 • 2007–2010 • 2012 • 2014 • 2024	
(Angola) Angolan	Maria Borges	꒰১ ໒꒱	2013–2017	
(France) French	Cindy Bruna		2013–2018 • 2026	
(Brazil) Brazilian	Adriana Lima	꒰১ ໒꒱	1999–2003 • 2005–2008 • 2010–2018 • 2024–present	VS 2 Angel (2000–2018)
(Poland) Polish	Magdalena Frackowiak	꒰১ ໒꒱	2010 • 2012–2015	
(France) French	Sigrid Agren		2013–2014	
(United States) American	Lily Aldridge	꒰১ ໒꒱	2009–2017 • 2024	VS 4 Angel (2010–2018)
(Netherlands) Dutch	Doutzen Kroes	꒰১ ໒꒱	2005–2006 • 2008–2009 • 2011–2014 • 2024–present	VS 3 Angel (2008–2014)
(France) French	Constance Jablonski		2010–2015	
(United States) American	Martha Hunt	꒰১ ໒꒱	2013–2018	★
(Namibia) Namibian	Behati Prinsloo	꒰১ ໒꒱	2007–2015 • 2018 • 2024–present	VS 3 Angel (2009–2019)
(Brazil) Brazilian	Alessandra Ambrosio	꒰১ ໒꒱	2000–2003 • 2005–2017 • 2024–present	VS 2 Angel (2004–2017)
(South Africa) South African	Candice Swanepoel	꒰১ ໒꒱	2007–2015 • 2017–2018 • 2024–present	VS 4 Angel (2010–2021)

== Finale ==
Song List	Performance	Status
(United Kingdom) Foxes	"Let Go For Tonight"	Recording

Name	Runway shows	Notes	Name	Runway shows	Notes
(Brazil) Alessandra Ambrosio	2000–03 • 2005–17 • 2024–present	VS 2 Angel (2004–17)	(Brazil) Adriana Lima	1999–2003 • 2005–2008 • 2010–2018 • 2024–present	VS 2 Angel (2000–2018)
(South Africa) Candice Swanepoel	2007–2015 • 2017–2018 • 2024–present	VS 4 Angel (2010–2021)	(United States) Karlie Kloss	2011–2014 • 2017	VS 4 Angel (2013–2015)
(United States) Lily Aldridge	2009–2017 • 2024	VS 4 Angel (2010–2021)	(Namibia) Behati Prinsloo	2007–2015 • 2018 • 2024–present	VS 3 Angel (2010–2018)
(Netherlands) Doutzen Kroes	2005–2006 • 2008–2009 • 2011–2014 • 2024–present	VS 3 Angel (2008–2014)	(Brazil) Lais Ribeiro	2010–2011 • 2013–2018	★
(United States) Martha Hunt	2013–2018	★	(France) Constance Jablonski	2010–2015	
(Puerto Rico) Joan Smalls	2011–2016 • 2024–present		(Brazil) Isabeli Fontana	2003 • 2005 • 2007–2010 • 2012 • 2014 • 2024	
(France) Sigrid Agren	2013–2014		(Brazil) Izabel Goulart	2005–2016	Former VS 3 Angel (2005–2008)
(Angola) Maria Borges	2013–2017		(France) Cindy Bruna	2013–2018 • 2026	
(Russia) Kate Grigorieva	2014–2016		(Sweden) Elsa Hosk	2011–2018 • 2026	★ PINK Angel (2011–2014)
(United Kingdom) Jourdan Dunn	2012–2014		(Brazil) Barbara Fialho	2012–2018	
(United States) Devon Windsor	2013–2018		(Belgium) Stella Maxwell	2014–2018 • 2025	★
(United Kingdom) Lily Donaldson	2010–2016		(Poland) Magdalena Frackowiak	2010 • 2012–2015	
(United States) Lindsay Ellingson	2007–2014	★ Former VS 4 Angel (2011–2014)	(China) Sui He	2011–2018	
(United States) Jasmine Tookes	2012–2018 • 2024–present	★	(Hungary) Enikő Mihalik	2009 • 2014	
(Poland) Kasia Struss	2013–2014		(Spain) Blanca Padilla	2014 • 2017	
(Russia) Irina Sharipova	2014		(Netherlands) Romee Strijd	2014–2018	
(Portugal) Sara Sampaio	2013–2018		(Australia) Shanina Shaik	2011–2012 • 2014–2015 • 2018	
(Brazil) Daniela Braga	2014–2017		(Poland) Jac Jagaciak	2013–2015	
(Sweden) Kelly Gale	2013–2014 • 2016–2018		(China) Ming Xi	2013–2018 • 2026	
(Netherlands) Maud Welzen	2012 • 2014–2015		(Netherlands) Imaan Hammam	2014 • 2024–present	
(Denmark) Josephine Skriver	2013–2018 • 2024		(United States) Taylor Hill	2014–2018 • 2024	
(Netherlands) Bregje Heinen	2011–2012 • 2014		(Belgium) Yumi Lambert	2014–2015	
(Canada) Grace Mahary	2014		(Latvia) Ieva Laguna	2011–2014	
(United States) Jacquelyn Jablonski	2010–2015				

== Index ==
Symbol	Meaning
VS 2	2nd Generation Angels
VS 3	3rd Generation Angels
VS 4	4th Generation Angels
PINK	PINK Angels
★	Star Billing
꒰১ ໒꒱	Wings
˚₊‧꒰ა ໒꒱ ‧₊˚	Swarovski Wing
