= Victoria's Secret Fashion Show 2016 =

Fashion event for lingerie

- Status: Active
- Genre: Fashion show
- Date: November 30, 2016
- Frequency: Annually
- Venue: Grand Palais
- Locations: Paris, France
- Years active: 1995–2003, 2005–2018, 2024–present
- Inaugurated: August 1, 1995
- Most recent: 2026
- Previous event: 2015
- Next event: 2017
- Budget: $20 million
- Member: Victoria's Secret
- Website: Victoria's Secret Fashion Show

The Victoria's Secret Fashion Show is an annual fashion show sponsored by Victoria's Secret. Victoria's Secret uses the show to promote and market its goods in high-profile settings. The show features some of the world's leading fashion models, such as current Victoria's Secret Angels Adriana Lima, Alessandra Ambrosio, Lily Aldridge, Lais Ribeiro, Elsa Hosk, Jasmine Tookes, Martha Hunt, Sara Sampaio, Stella Maxwell, Taylor Hill, Romee Strijd, and Josephine Skriver. Behati Prinsloo and Candice Swanepoel both missed this year's show due to their pregnancies. The show also featured PINK spokesmodels Grace Elizabeth, Zuri Tibby and Rachel Hilbert.

The Victoria's Secret Fashion Show 2016 was recorded in Paris, France at the Grand Palais. The show featured musical performances by Lady Gaga, The Weeknd, and Bruno Mars. Angel Jasmine Tookes was wearing the Victoria's Secret Fantasy Bra: The Bright Night Fantasy Bra worth $3,000,000.

The event faced criticism or cultural appropriation and Orientalism during its multi-cultural "The Road Ahead" segment. Critics condemned the lingerie giant for pairing indigenous and Eastern motifs—such as massive feathered dragon costumes and Mexican-inspired boots—with non-minority models.

Dates	Locations	Broadcaster	Director	Viewers (millions)	Performers
November 30, 2016 (recorded); December 5, 2016	Paris, France	CBS	Hamish Hamilton	6.67	Lady Gaga, The Weeknd, and Bruno Mars.

== Fashion show segments ==
=== Segment 1: The Road Ahead ===
Performer	Song(s)	Status
(Republic of Ireland) U2	"Vertigo"	Remixed Recording
(United States) Stevie Wonder	"Uptight (Everything's Alright)"	Remixed Recording
(United States) Kesha	"Animal"	Remixed Recording

Nationality	Model	Wings	Runway shows	Status
(Sweden) Swedish	Elsa Hosk	꒰১ ໒꒱	2011–2018 • 2026	VS 5 Angels (2015–2020)
(United States) American	Taylor Hill		2014–2018 • 2024	VS 5 Angels (2015–2020)
(Angola) Angolan	Maria Borges	꒰১ ໒꒱	2013–2017	
(Brazil) Brazilian	Lais Ribeiro		2010–2011 • 2013–2018	VS 5 Angel (2015–2021)
(Brazil) Brazilian	Adriana Lima	꒰১ ໒꒱	1999–2003 • 2005–2008 • 2010–2018 • 2024–present	VS 2 Angel (2000–2018)
(China) Chinese	Liu Wen		2009–2012 • 2016–2018 • 2024–present	
(United States) American	Kendall Jenner	꒰১ ໒꒱	2015–2016 • 2018	
(China) Chinese	Ming Xi		2013–2018 • 2026	
(United States) American	Devon Windsor	꒰১ ໒꒱	2013–2018	
(France) French	Cindy Bruna		2013–2018 • 2026	
(Puerto Rico) Puerto Rican	Joan Smalls		2011–2016 • 2024–present	
(United States) American	Jasmine Tookes	꒰১ ໒꒱	2012–2018 • 2024–present	VS 5 Angel (2015–2021)
(United States) American	Gigi Hadid		2015–2016 • 2018 • 2024–present	
(Brazil) Brazilian	Daniela Braga		2014–2017	
(United States) American	Martha Hunt		2013–2018	VS 5 Angel (2015–2019)
(Brazil) Brazilian	Barbara Fialho		2012–2018	
(Brazil) Brazilian	Alessandra Ambrosio	꒰১ ໒꒱	2000–2003 • 2005–2017 • 2024–present	VS 2 Angel (2004–2017)

=== Segment 2: Mountain Romance ===
Performer	Song	Status
(United States) Lady Gaga	"Million Reasons"	Live Performance

Nationality	Model	Wings	Runway Shows	Status
(Denmark) Danish	Josephine Skriver	꒰১ ໒꒱	2013–2018 • 2024	New VS 5 Angel (2016–2021)
(Netherlands) Dutch	Sanne Vloet	꒰১ ໒꒱	2015–2017	
(United States) American	Lily Aldridge	꒰১ ໒꒱	2009–2017 • 2025	VS 4 Angel (2010–2018)
(United Kingdom) British	Megan Williams		2016–2018	
(China) Chinese	Sui He	꒰১ ໒꒱	2011–2018	
(United Kingdom) British	Leomie Anderson	꒰১ ໒꒱	2015–2018	
(Sweden) Swedish	Kelly Gale	꒰১ ໒꒱	2013–2014 • 2016–2018	
(United Kingdom) British	Lily Donaldson	˚₊‧꒰ა ໒꒱ ‧₊˚	2010–2016	
(Brazil) Brazilian	Izabel Goulart	꒰১ ໒꒱	2005–2016	Former VS 3 Angel (2005–2008)
(Belgium) Belgian	Stella Maxwell	꒰১ ໒꒱	2014–2018 • 2025	VS 5 Angels (2015–2021)
(Portugal) Portuguese	Sara Sampaio	꒰১ ໒꒱	2013–2018	VS 5 Angels (2015–2021)
(United States) American	Keke Lindgard	꒰১ ໒꒱	2016	
(Brazil) Brazilian	Flavia Lucini		2015–2016	
(Netherlands) Dutch	Romee Strijd	꒰১ ໒꒱	2014–2018	VS 5 Angel (2015–2021)

=== Segment 3: Pink Nation ===
Performer	Song	Status
(United States) Bruno Mars	"Chunky"	Live Performance

Nationality	Model(s)	Wings	Runway shows	Status
(United States) American	Grace Elizabeth	꒰১ ໒꒱	2016–2018 • 2024–present	PINK Angel (2016–2019)
(Tanzania) Tanzanian	Herieth Paul		2016-2018	
(Australia) Australian	Bridget Malcolm		2015–2016	
(China) Chinese	Xiao Wen Ju		2016–2017 • 2025	
(United States) American	Rachel Hilbert		2015–2016	PINK Angel (2015–2017)
(United States) American	Alanna Arrington		2016–2018	
(Brazil) Brazilian	Lais Oliveira		2016	
(United States) American	Maggie Laine	꒰১ ໒꒱	2016–2018	
(France) French	Camille Rowe		2016	
(United States) American	Brooke Perry		2016	
(United States) American	Zuri Tibby		2016–2018	PINK Angel (2016–2019)
(United States) American	Lameka Fox		2016–2018	
(Brazil) Brazilian	Luma Grothe		2016	
(United States) American	Dilone		2016–2017	

=== Segment 4: Secret Angel ===
Performer	Song	Status
(Canada) The Weeknd	"Starboy"	Live Performance

Nationality	Model	Wings	Runway shows	Status
(Brazil) Brazilian	Adriana Lima	꒰১ ໒꒱	1999–2003 • 2005–2008 • 2010–2018 • 2024–present	VS 2 Angel (2000–2018)
(Russia) Russian	Valery Kaufman		2015–2016	
(United States) American	Bella Hadid		2016–2018 • 2024–present	
(United States) American	Jourdana Phillips		2016–2018	
(France) French	Cindy Bruna	꒰১ ໒꒱	2013–2018 • 2026	
(China) Chinese	Ming Xi		2013–2018 • 2026	
(Netherlands) Dutch	Sanne Vloet		2015–2017	
(Sweden) Swedish	Elsa Hosk	꒰১ ໒꒱	2011–2018 • 2026	VS 5 Angel (2015–2020)
(Russia) Russian	Irina Shayk		2016 • 2024–present	
(United Kingdom) British	Leomie Anderson		2015–2018	
(China) Chinese	Liu Wen		2009–2012 • 2016–2018 • 2024–present	
(New Zealand) New Zealander	Georgia Fowler		2016–2018	
(Portugal) Portuguese	Sara Sampaio	꒰১ ໒꒱	2013–2018	VS 5 Angel (2015–2021)

=== Segment 5: Dark Angel ===
Performer	Song	Status
(United States) Lady Gaga	"A-Yo"	Live Performance
(United States) Lady Gaga	"John Wayne"	Live Performance

Nationality	Model	Wings	Runway shows	Status
(United States) American	Taylor Hill	꒰১ ໒꒱	2014–2018 • 2024	VS 5 Angel (2015–2020)
(United States) American	Gigi Hadid	꒰১ ໒꒱	2015–2016 • 2018 • 2024–present	
(China) Chinese	Sui He	꒰১ ໒꒱	2011–2018	
(United States) American	Kendall Jenner	꒰১ ໒꒱	2015–2016 • 2018	
(United States) American	Devon Windsor	꒰১ ໒꒱	2013–2018	
(Brazil) Brazilian	Lais Ribeiro	꒰১ ໒꒱	2010–2011 • 2013–2018	VS 5 Angel (2015–2021)
(Russia) Russian	Kate Grigorieva		2014–2016	Former VS 5 Angel (2015–2016)
(United States) American	Martha Hunt	꒰১ ໒꒱	2013–2018	VS 5 Angel (2015–2019)
(Brazil) Brazilian	Alessandra Ambrosio	꒰১ ໒꒱	2000–2003 • 2005–2017 • 2024–present	VS 2 Angel (2004–2017)
(Brazil) Brazilian	Barbara Fialho	꒰১ ໒꒱	2012–2018	
(Brazil) Brazilian	Izabel Goulart	꒰১ ໒꒱	2005–2016	Former VS 3 Angel (2005–2008)
(Puerto Rico) Puerto Rican	Joan Smalls	꒰১ ໒꒱	2011–2016 • 2024–present	

=== Segment 6: Bright Night Angel ===
Performer	Song	Status
(United States) Bruno Mars	"24K Magic"	Live Performance

Nationality	Model	Wings	Runway shows	Notes	Fantasy Bra + Swarovski Outfit	Value
(Belgium) Belgian	Stella Maxwell	꒰১ ໒꒱	2014–2018 • 2025	VS 5 Angel (2015–2021)		
(Belgium) Belgian	Georgia Fowler		2016–2018			
(United States) American	Jasmine Tookes		2012–2018 • 2024–present	VS 5 Angel (2015–2021)	Bright Night Fantasy Bra by Eddie Borgo & AWMouzannar	$3,000,000
(United States) American	Bella Hadid	꒰১ ໒꒱	2016–2018 • 2024–present			
(Angola) Angolan	Maria Borges	꒰১ ໒꒱	2013–2017			
(United Kingdom) British	Lily Donaldson	꒰১ ໒꒱	2010–2016			
(Russia) Russian	Irina Shayk		2016 • 2024–present			
(Netherlands) Dutch	Romee Strijd	꒰১ ໒꒱	2014–2018	VS 5 Angel (2015–2021)		
(Denmark) Danish	Josephine Skriver		2013–2018 • 2024	New VS 5 Angel (2016–2021)	Silver Fringe Swarovski Outfit	–
(Sweden) Swedish	Kelly Gale	꒰১ ໒꒱	2013–2014 • 2016–2018			
(United States) American	Jourdana Phillips		2016–2018			
(United States) American	Lily Aldridge	꒰১ ໒꒱	2009–2017 • 2025	VS 4 Angel (2010–2018)		

== Finale ==
Performer	Song	Status
(United States) Bronze Radio Return	"Light Me Up"	Recording

Model	Runway shows	Status	Model	Runway shows	Status
(Brazil) Adriana Lima	1999–2003 • 2005–2008 • 2010–2018 • 2024–present	VS 2 Angel (2000–2018)	(Sweden) Elsa Hosk	2011–2018 • 2026	VS 5 Angel (2015–2020)
(United States) Jasmine Tookes	2012-2018 • 2024–present	VS 5 Angel (2015–2021)	(Brazil) Alessandra Ambrosio	2000–2003 • 2005–2017 • 2024–present	VS 2 Angel (2004–2017)
(Denmark) Josephine Skriver	2013–2018 • 2024	New VS 5 Angel (2016–2021)	(United States) Taylor Hill	2014–2018 • 2024	VS 5 Angels (2015–2020)
(Belgium) Stella Maxwell	2014–2018 • 2025	VS 5 Angel (2015–2021)	(United States) Martha Hunt	2013–2018	VS 5 Angels (2015–2020)
(United States) Lily Aldridge	2009–2017 • 2025	VS 4 Angel (2010–2018)	(Portugal) Sara Sampaio	2013–2018	VS 5 Angels (2015–2020)
(Netherlands) Romee Strijd	2014–2018	VS 5 Angel (2015–2021)	(Brazil) Lais Ribeiro	2010–2011 • 2013–2018	VS 5 Angels (2015–2020)
(United Kingdom) Lily Donaldson	2010–2016		(United States) Gigi Hadid	2015–2016 • 2018 • 2024–present	
(Puerto Rico) Joan Smalls	2011–2016 • 2024–present		(United States) Kendall Jenner	2015-2016 • 2018	
(Russia) Irina Shayk	2016 • 2024–present		(China) Liu Wen	2009–2012 • 2016–2018 • 2024–present	
(United States) Bella Hadid	2016–2018 • 2024–present		(China) Sui He	2011–2018	
(France) Cindy Bruna	2013–2018 • 2026		(Brazil) Izabel Goulart	2005–2016	Former VS 3 Angel (2005–2008)
(New Zealand) Georgia Fowler	2016–18		(China) Ming Xi	2013–2018 • 2026	
(Sweden) Kelly Gale	2013–2014 • 2016–2018		(Brazil) Barbara Fialho	2012–2018	
(Angola) Maria Borges	2013–2017		(United States) Devon Windsor	2013–2018	
(United States) Jourdana Phillips	2016–2018		(Brazil) Daniela Braga	2014–2017	
(United Kingdom) Leomie Anderson	2015–2018		(Russia) Kate Grigorieva	2014–2016	Former VS 5 Angel (2015–2016)
(Russia) Valery Kaufman	2015–2016		(Netherlands) Sanne Vloet	2015–2017	
(United States) Keke Lindgard	2016		(United Kingdom) Megan Williams	2016–2018	
(Brazil) Flavia Lucini	2015–2016		(United States) Grace Elizabeth	2016-2018 • 2024–present	PINK Angel (2016–2019)
(United States) Alanna Arrington	2016–2018		(United States) Dilone	2016–2017	
(Brazil) Luma Grothe	2016		(Tanzania) Herieth Paul	2016–2018	
(United States) Maggie Laine	2016–2018		(United States) Lameka Fox	2016–2018	
(Australia) Bridget Malcolm	2015–2016		(Brazil) Lais Oliveira	2016	
(United States) Brooke Perry	2016		(China) Xiao Wen Ju	2016–2017 • 2025	
(United States) Rachel Hilbert	2015–2016	PINK Angel (2015–2017)	(France) Camille Rowe	2016	
			(United States) Zuri Tibby	2016–2018	PINK Angel (2016–2019)

== Index ==
Symbol	Meaning
VS 2	2nd Generation Angels
VS 4	4th Generation Angels
VS 5	5th Generation Angels
VS C	Chinese Angels
PINK	PINK Angels
꒰১ ໒꒱	Wings
˚₊‧꒰ა ໒꒱ ‧₊˚	Swarovski Wing
