= List of Victoria's Secret models =

List of fashion models

This is a list of current and former Victoria's Secret Angels and fashion models who have walked in the Victoria's Secret Fashion Show since its inception in 1995.

== Victoria's Secret Angels ==
Models who were chosen as Victoria's Secret Angels are listed in the table below. In June 2021, Victoria's Secret announced that it was ending its Angels brand.

Name	Age	Nationality	Listed height (m)	Contract	Shows	Show years	Fantasy Bras
Lily Aldridge	41	(United States) American	1.75	2010–2018	10	2009–2017; 2025	2015
Alessandra Ambrosio	45	(Brazil) Brazilian	1.77	2004–2017	20	2000–2003; 2005–2017; 2024–2026	2012; 2014 (Note: Shared with Adriana Lima)
Leomie Anderson	33	(United Kingdom) British	1.79	2019–2021	4	2015–2018	None
Tyra Banks	52	(United States) American	1.78	1997–2005	10	1996–2003; 2005; 2024	1997; 2004
Gisele Bündchen	46	(Brazil) Brazilian	1.80	2000–2007	7	1999–2006	2000; 2005
Laetitia Casta	48	(France) French	1.70	1998–2000	4	1997–2000	None
Helena Christensen	57	(Denmark) Danish	1.78	1997–1998	2	1996–1997	None
Selita Ebanks	43	(Cayman Islands) Caymanian	1.77	2005–2009	6	2005–2010	2007
Grace Elizabeth	29	(United States) American	1.78	2019–2021	6	2016–2018; 2024–2026	None
Lindsay Ellingson	42	(United States) American	1.80	2011–2014	8	2007–2014	None
Izabel Goulart	42	(Brazil) Brazilian	1.79	2005–2008	12	2005–2016	None
Alexina Graham	36	(United Kingdom) British	1.82	2019–2021	2	2017–2018	None
Kate Grigorieva	38	(Russia) Russian	1.80	2015–2016	3	2014–2016	None
Erin Heatherton	37	(United States) American	1.80	2010–2013	6	2008–2013	None
Taylor Hill	30	(United States) American	1.79	2015–2020	6	2014–2018; 2024	None
Elsa Hosk	38	(Sweden) Swedish	1.76	2015–2020	9	2011–2018; 2026	2018
Martha Hunt	37	(United States) American	1.79	2015–2019	6	2013–2018	None
Rosie Huntington-Whiteley	39	(United Kingdom) British	1.75	2010–2011	6	2006–2010; 2026	None
Chanel Iman	35	(United States) American	1.78	2010–2012	3	2009–2011	None
Jac Jagaciak	32	(Poland) Polish	1.79	2015–2016	3	2013–2015	None
Miranda Kerr	43	(Australia) Australian	1.75	2007–2013	6	2006–2009; 2011–2012	2011
Karlie Kloss	34	(United States) American	1.82	2013–2015	5	2011–2014; 2017	None
Heidi Klum	53	(Germany) German	1.76	1999–2010	11	1997–2003; 2005; 2007–2009	1999; 2001; 2003
Doutzen Kroes	41	(Netherlands) Dutch	1.79	2008–2014	11	2005–2006; 2008–2009; 2011–2014; 2024–2026	None
Karolína Kurková	42	(Czech Republic) Czech	1.80	2005–2009	9	2000–2003; 2005–2008; 2010	2002; 2006
Adriana Lima	45	(Brazil) Brazilian	1.78	2000–2018	21	1999–2003; 2005–2008; 2010–2018; 2024–2026	2008; 2010; 2014 (Note: Shared with Alessandra Ambrosio)
Stella Maxwell	36	(United Kingdom) British	1.79	2015–2021	6	2014–2018; 2025	None
Marisa Miller	48	(United States) American	1.73	2007–2009	3	2007–2009	2009
Karen Mulder	56	(Netherlands) Dutch	1.78	1996–2000	5	1996–2000	None
Chandra North	56	(United States) American	1.75	1998	2	1997–1998	None
Barbara Palvin	33	(Hungary) Hungarian	1.75	2019–2021	5	2012; 2018; 2024–2026	None
Daniela Peštová	56	(Czech Republic) Czech	1.80	1997–2001	4	1998–2001	1998
Behati Prinsloo	38	(Namibia) Namibian	1.80	2009–2019	13	2007–2015; 2018; 2024–2026	None
Lais Ribeiro	36	(Brazil) Brazilian	1.82	2015–2021	8	2010–2011; 2013–2018	2017
Inés Rivero	51	(Argentina) Argentinian	1.80	1998–1999	4	1998–2001	None
Sara Sampaio	35	(Portugal) Portuguese	1.72	2015–2021	6	2013–2018	None
Stephanie Seymour	58	(United States) American	1.78	1997–2000	6	1995–2000	None
Josephine Skriver	33	(Denmark) Danish	1.80	2016–2021	7	2013–2018; 2024	None
Romee Strijd	31	(Netherlands) Dutch	1.82	2015–2021	5	2014–2018	None
Candice Swanepoel	38	(South Africa) South African	1.78	2010–2021	14	2007–2015; 2017–2018; 2024–2026	2013
Jasmine Tookes	35	(United States) American	1.75	2015–2021	10	2012–2018; 2024–2026	2016

== PINK spokesmodels ==
The following is the list of models who have been contracted as spokesmodels for Victoria's Secret's PINK brand.

Name	Nationality	Contract
Alessandra Ambrosio	(Brazil) Brazilian	2004–2006
Jessica Stam	(Canada) Canadian	2006–2007
Miranda Kerr	(Australia) Australian	2006–2009
Behati Prinsloo	(Namibia) Namibian	2008–2011
Jessica Hart	(Australia) Australian	2011–2013
Elsa Hosk	(Sweden) Swedish	2011–2014
Rachel Hilbert	(United States) American	2015–2017
Zuri Tibby	(United States) American	2016–2019
Grace Elizabeth	(United States) American	2016–2019
Maggie Laine	(United States) American	2018–2019
