= Nadine Leopold =

Austrian model (born 1994)

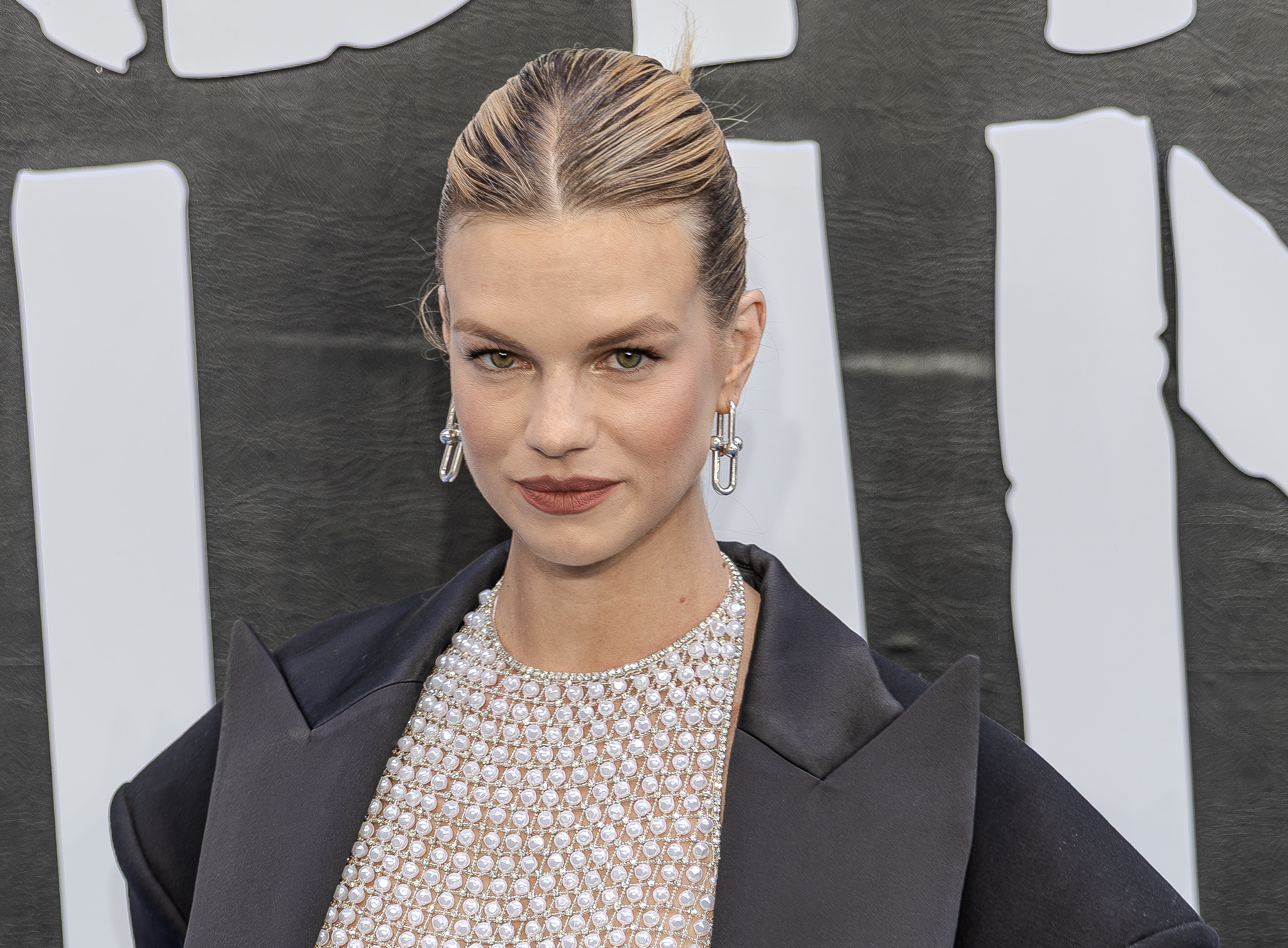
- Nadine Leopold in 2025.
- Born: January 7, 1994 (age 32); Wolfsberg, Carinthia, Austria
- Occupation: Model
- Partner: Andrew Barclay (m. 2022)
- Modeling information
- Height: 1.77 m (5 ft 10 in)
- Hair color: Blonde
- Eye color: Green
- Agency: IMG Models (New York, Paris, Milan, London, Los Angeles, Sydney); Uno Models (Barcelona)

Nadine Leopold (born 7 January 1994) is an Austrian model best known for walking in the Victoria's Secret Fashion Show in 2017 and 2018.

== Early life ==
Nadine Leopold grew up in Wolfsberg, Carinthia, Austria where she was scouted at age 16.

== Career ==
In 2014, she covered Glamour (France) and Grey and posed for Cosmopolitan.

In 2015, she covered Glamour (Germany) and Fashion Week Daily and was in editorials of Vogue.com, A and Marie Claire (UK). She was featured in the Botkier New York fall campaign as well as several Victoria's Secret shoots

She walked for Victoria's Secret Fashion Show 2017 and Victoria's Secret Fashion Show 2018.

== Personal life ==
Since the end of 2018 she has had a relationship with the English businessman Andrew Barclay. In 2022 the Austrian model announced their engagement on Instagram. They married on 2 July 2022.
