= Grace Bol =

South Sudanese fashion model (born 1990)

- Born: 1 January 1990 (age 35); South Sudan
- Occupation: Model
- Years active: 2011–present
- Modeling information
- Height: 1.80 m (5 ft 11 in)
- Hair color: Black
- Eye color: Brown
- Agency: Oui Management (Paris); Why Not Model Management (Milan); The Hive Management (London); Core Artist Management (Hamburg); The Lions (New York) (mother agency)

Grace Bol (born 1 January 1990) is a South Sudanese fashion model best known for walking in the Victoria's Secret Fashion Show in 2017 and 2018.

== Career ==
Her modelling career started at the age of 19, when she moved to New York after being scouted in her local mall in Kansas City, Missouri. Grace had her first breakthrough when she signed with Major Model agency and walked the fall 2011 Givenchy, Maison Martin Marigela and Vivienne Westwood shows in Paris. She was also on hold to shoot for the fall 2011 Givenchy campaign.

In 2015, Grace had her breakthrough runway season when she appeared on the runway for Rick Owens, Proenza Schouler, Balenciaga and opened Hermès show. She appeared in editorials for Flaunt, Vogue Germany, Marie Claire USA, Harper's Bazaar UK, W Magazine, and on the cover of I-D.

In 2017, she walked for Victoria's Secret fashion show in Shanghai and appeared in Balmain campaign.

In 2018, she walked again in the Victoria's Secret Fashion Show 2018.
