= Gizele Oliveira =

Brazilian model (born 1993)

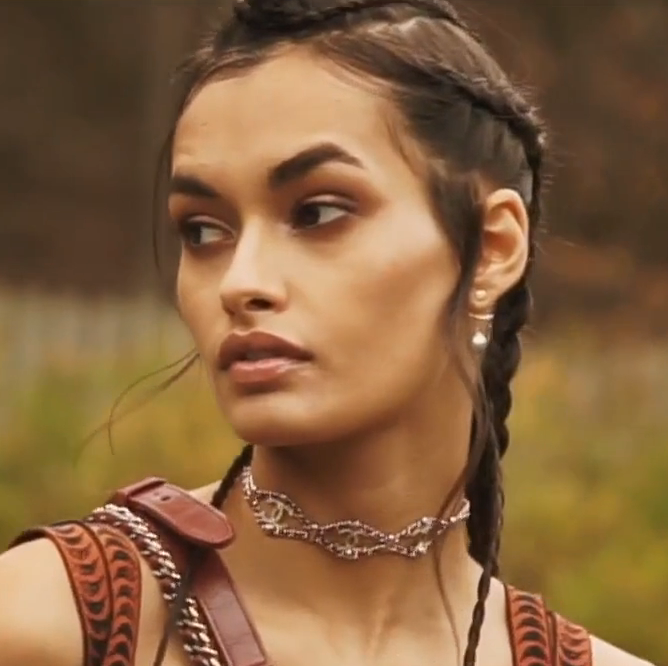
- Oliveira in the shortfilm "Into the Woods" in 2017
- Born: 7 May 1993 (age 33); Vila Velha, Espírito Santo, Brazil
- Occupation: Model
- Modeling information
- Height: 1.75 m (5 ft 9 in)
- Hair color: Brown
- Eye color: Brown
- Agency: IMG Models (worldwide); d model agency (Athens); Line-Up Model Management (Barcelona); Elite Model Management (Copenhagen); Modellink (Gothenburg); LA Model Management (Los Angeles); Munich Models (Munich); Way Model Management (Sao Paulo)

Gizele Oliveira (born 7 May 1993) is a Brazilian model best known for walking in the Victoria's Secret Fashion Show 2017, 2018 and 2026.

== Career ==
Gizele Oliveira was born on 7 May 1993 in Vila Velha, Espírito Santo, Brazil and began her modeling career in 2013, when she was recruited by Mc2 Models in Miami. She moved to Miami with little to no money, no knowledge of the English language, and no family. Her mother, who raised her and 3 other children remained in Brazil, working as a school teacher and making minimum wage. The beginning for Gizele was a struggle but her strong will to work hard, listen, and learn from her agents helped her gain a quick grip onto the Miami modeling scene. While in Miami she shot her first ever international cover, Elle Argentina. She started gaining traction in the market, and learned to speak the English language fast through her American boyfriend and daily conversations with her then agency. Gizele caught the beginning of the Instagram era, and learned how to promote herself through travels between London, Seattle, Miami, and Brazil. After establishing herself in the Miami market she moved to NYC in 2014 and signed with IMG Models and walked for Dolce & Gabbana during her fashion week debut. She walked at fashion shows for Elie Saab, Etam, Polo Ralph Lauren, Cushnie et Ochs, Rebecca Minkoff and Tory Burch. Gisele has appeared in editorials for Vogue Mexico, Vogue Brazil, Vogue India, Elle France, L'Officiel India, Harper's Bazaar Kazakhstan, was in a campaign for H&M and fronted a beauty campaign for MAC Cosmetics. In 2015, she appeared on the cover of Elle Brazil shot by Nicole Heiniger. She has, since then, appeared on the cover of L'Officiel Thailand. and more.

In 2017, she walked for Victoria's Secret fashion show in Shanghai.

In 2018, she was announced to be walking in the Victoria's Secret Fashion Show 2018.

In 2026, she returned after 8 years for Victorias Secret Fashion Show 2026 in Los Angeles.
