= Vanessa Moody =

American fashion model (born 1995)

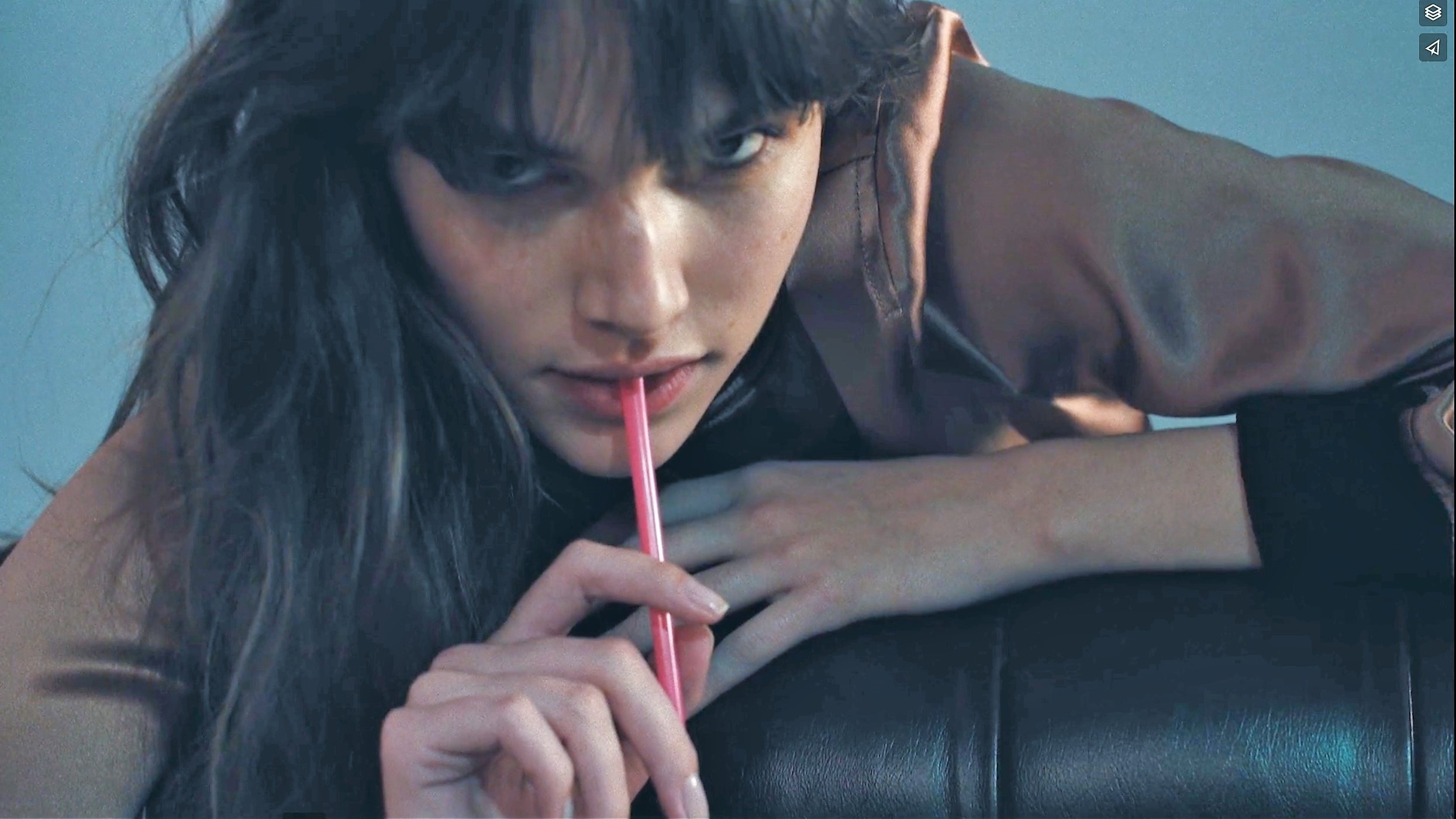
- Moody for Chaos in 2016
- Born: Vanessa Erin Moody; November 20, 1995 (age 30); Mississippi, U.S.
- Modeling information
- Height: 5 ft 11 in (180 cm)
- Hair color: Brown
- Eye color: Brown
- Agency: Elite Model Management (New York); Select Model Management (Paris); Women Model Management (Milan); Models 1 (London); Scoop Models (Copenhagen); Modellink (Stockholm); Priscilla's Model Management (Sydney); The Campbell Agency (Dallas) (mother agency)

Vanessa Erin Moody (born November 20, 1995) is an American model. Who began her career in 2014 as an exclusive for Alexander Wang.

== Career ==
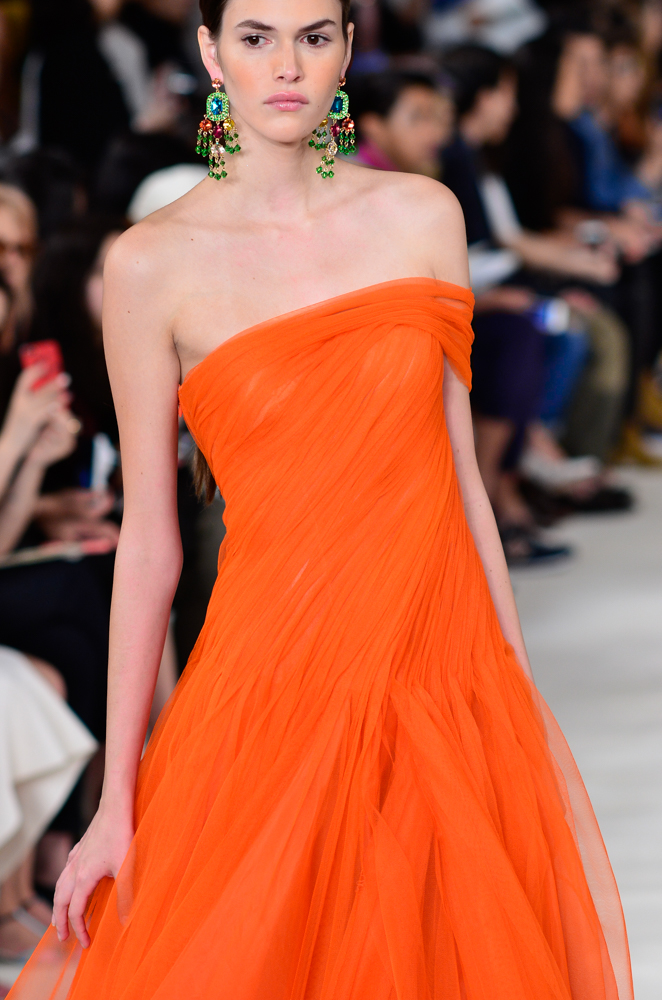
Moody walking the runway for Ralph Lauren in 2014.

Moody's father encouraged her to pursue modeling and brought her to an open call at The Campbell Agency in Dallas. She debuted as an exclusive for Alexander Wang (opening his F/W 2014 show) and Balenciaga; the next season she walked in almost 50 shows, including closing for Givenchy. A following season brought her to an almost record 72 shows. She has appeared in campaigns for Alexander Wang, Valentino, Versace Jeans, Coach New York, Michael Kors, to name a few.

In 2014, Moody was chosen as a "Top Newcomer" by models.com. She previously ranked on their "Money Girl" list.

Moody walked in the 2017 Victoria’s Secret Fashion Show.

In 2014 Moody started an editorial career with a shoot for Vogue Paris and Love Magazine.

In 2015 she appeared on her first two Vogue covers by photographer Steven Meisel. By the second cover she had earned a spot in Vogue Italia's 50th Anniversary 50 Top Models. Following that same year she had her first solo cover with Vogue Germany.
