= Roosmarijn de Kok =

Dutch fashion model

- Born: 18 December 1994 (age 31); Amerongen, Netherlands
- Modeling information
- Height: 1.78 m (5 ft 10 in)
- Hair color: Blonde
- Eye color: Green
- Agency: Women Management (New York); Oui Management (Paris); Monster Management (Milan); Elite Model Management (London, Barcelona); Unique Models (Copenhagen); Model Management (Hamburg)

Roosmarijn "Roos" de Kok (Dutch: [ˈroːsmaːrɛin ˈroːz də ˈkɔk]; born 18 December 1994) is a Dutch fashion model, best known for her work for Victoria's Secret.

== Early life ==
De Kok was born on 18 December 1994 in Amerongen, Netherlands.

== Career ==
She was discovered at a birthday party where another guest, who was a model, told her to look into modelling and sent a picture of her to Wilhelmina Models. After video-calling the agency, she was asked to come to New York City and signed with the agency in early 2013. She was formerly signed to Wilhelmina Models.

She has been in campaigns for brands such as Balmain, H&M, PacSun, Victoria’s Secret, Tom Ford, Wildfox Couture, and Giuseppe Zanotti. She has appeared in editorials for various international editions of Vogue and Elle.

De Kok has walked the runway for brands such as Philipp Plein, Oscar de la Renta, Cushnie, Balmain, Ralph Lauren, and the Victoria's Secret Fashion Show.

De Kok was described as the "model du moment" by the Daily Front Row in 2016. Vogue Australia described her as one of the new era supermodels.

In 2018, De Kok launched Roos Unlimited, a company for investments and brand collaboration.

== Personal life ==
De Kok lived in New York City. She has since moved to Miami, Florida.
