= Estelle Chen =

French model (born 1998)

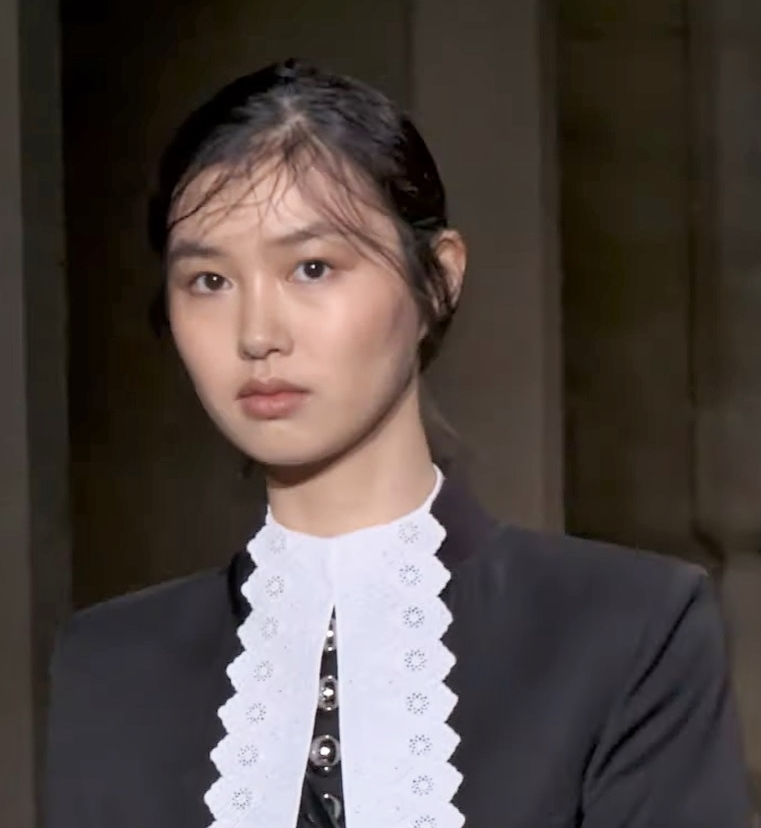
- Chen in 2020
- Born: 4 March 1998 (age 28); Paris, France
- Years active: 2013–present
- Known for: Elite Model Look
- Modeling information
- Height: 1.78 m (5 ft 10 in)
- Hair color: Black
- Eye color: Brown
- Agency: Ford Models (New York, Paris); Elite Model Management (Milan, Amsterdam, Barcelona, Copenhagen); Storm Management (London); THE.mgmt (Alexandria); Modelwerk (Hamburg)

Estelle Chen (born 4 March 1998) is a French model of Chinese descent.

== Early life ==
Estelle Chen was born in Paris to Chinese parents from Wenzhou, a city in Zhejiang province.

Estelle was scouted by an agent of Elite Model Management in 2012. In 2013, she won Elite Model Look in France. She represented her country at the international contest at Shenzhen in China and placed in the top 15. She then signed a 3-year contract with Elite Model Management.

== Career ==
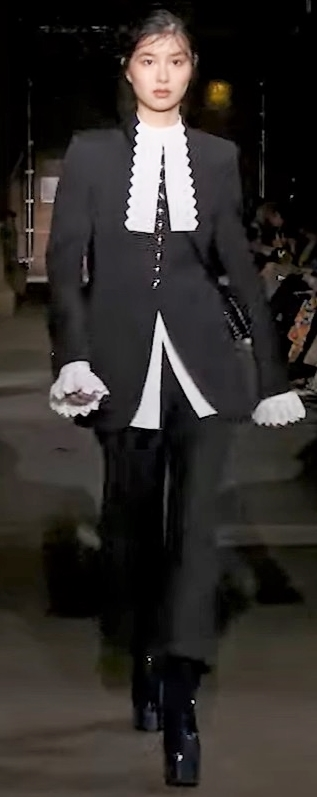
Chen walking the runway at the Paco Rabanne Fall-Winter 2020-2021 show

She started walking the runway in September 2014, for Eudon Choi. In December, she was in an editorial for SKP Magazine. In January 2015, she walked for La Parla Atelier, the brand's first ever couture collection. In February, she advertised swimsuit brand Mikoh, filmed by Tim Mckenna in Bora Bora and in March ready-to-wear brand Luxe Deluxe.

Her breakout was during the F/W 15 fashion weeks, in March 2015, when she walked the runway for Nehera, Kenzo, LOEWE, Véronique Leroy, Louis Vuitton and Miu Miu. In May, she walked the Dior Resort 2016 fashion show. She covered the June edition of Vogue Italia Beauty, photographed by Miles Aldridge. That same month, she walked the Dior fashion show in Tokyo. In July, she walked for Dolce & Gabbana, Dior, Alberta Ferretti, Elie Saab, Jean Paul Gaultier and Fendi. She was photographed by Juergen Teller for Louis Vuitton's Autumn/Winter 2015 lookbook. In September, she walked for Thakoon, Victoria Beckham, Opening Ceremony, Michael Kors, Boss, Preen by Thornton Bregazzi, David Koma, Issa, Antonio Berardi, Fay, Emilio Pucci, Dolce & Gabbana, Aquilano.Rimondi, Each x Other, Chloé, Paco Rabanne, Dior, Kenzo, Shiatzy Chen, Louis Vuitton et Miu Miu.

She walked in the 2017 and 2018 Victoria's Secret Fashion Shows.
