= Alexina Graham =

English fashion model

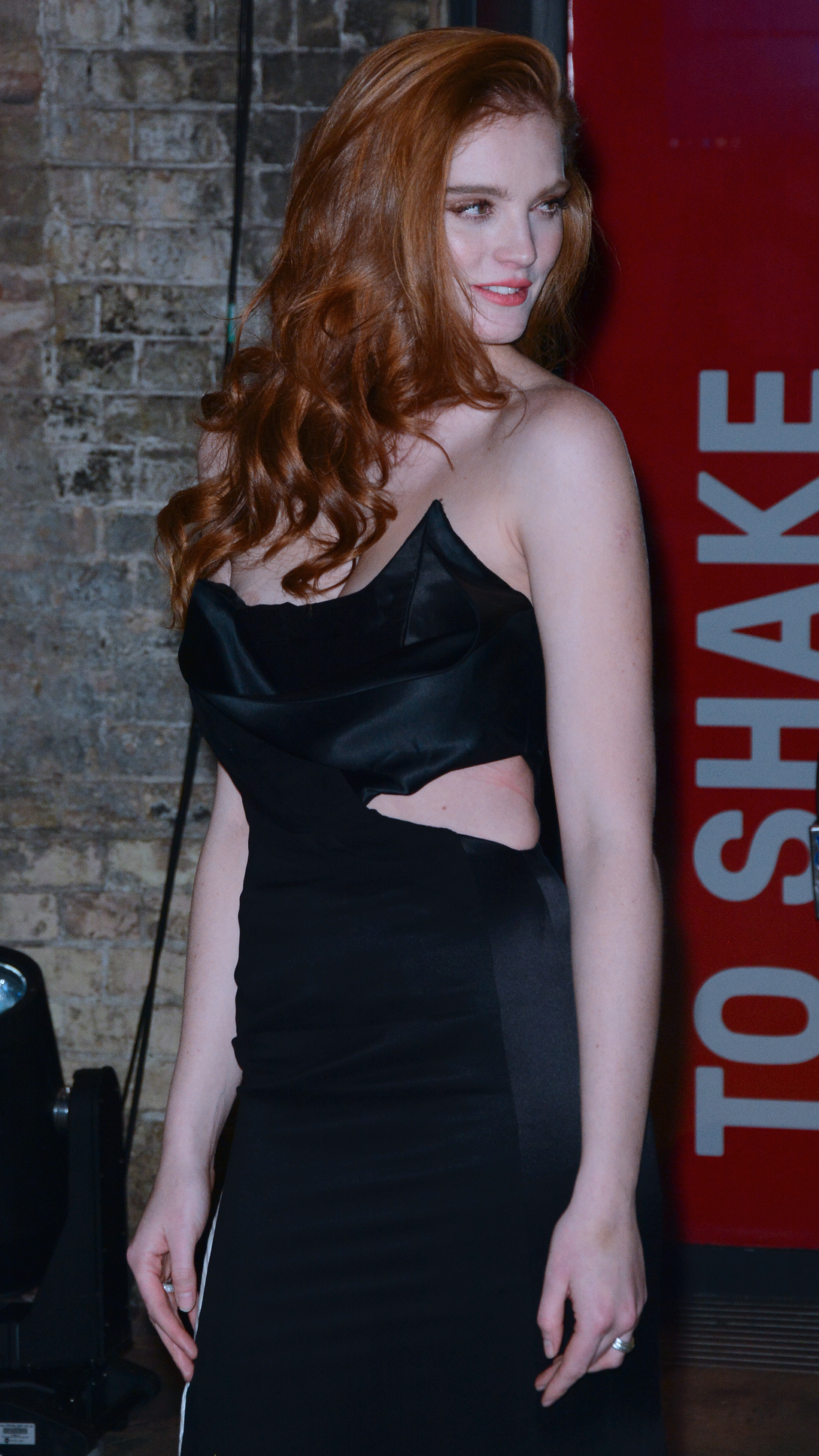
- Graham in 2019
- Born: Alexina Lorna Graham; 3 March 1990 (age 36); Worksop, Nottinghamshire, England
- Occupation: Fashion model
- Modelling information
- Height: 5 ft 11 1/2 in (1.82 m)
- Hair colour: Red
- Eye colour: Green
- Agency: Elite Model Management (New York, Paris, Amsterdam, Copenhagen); Women Management (Milan); Models 1 (London); Munich Models (Munich); MIKAs (Stockholm)

Alexina Lorna Graham (born 3 March 1990) is an English fashion model. Graham began working with Victoria's Secret after walking in the Victoria's Secret Fashion Show 2017. She became a Victoria's Secret Angel in 2019, and is the first redhead to ever become an Angel. Graham is also a brand ambassador for L'Oréal Paris.

== Early life ==
Graham was born in Worksop, Nottinghamshire. Her parents split up when she was three, and she later grew up between their homes in Worksop and Wakefield. Graham attended Valley Comprehensive School and pursued studies in midwifery, before leaving to pursue modelling. She trained in ballet for 12 years, and was also bullied in school as a child for her red hair.

== Career ==
She began her modelling career in 2008, when she was one of the winners of the 2008 Ford modeling competition, won a beauty contract with Maybelline and shot an editorial for Another Magazine. Alexina appeared in editorials for I.D., Glamour U.S., Teen Vogue, L’Officiel Singapore, Harper's Bazaar Serbia, Marie Claire Russia, InStyle, WWD, Vogue Italia and Vogue Arabia, as well as in campaigns for Burberry, Balmain, L'Oréal and Victoria's Secret. She has walked the runway for Balmain, Emporio Armani, Brandon Maxwell, Etam, and Jean-Paul Gaultier.

In 2017, she walked for Victoria's Secret Fashion Show 2017. She walked for the second time in the Victoria's Secret Fashion Show 2018. Graham became a Victoria's Secret Angel in 2019.

In 2022, Graham founded the fashion brand XINA NYC. The company donate 5% of their profits to mental health charities, including to Beder UK which Graham is an ambassador for.
