= Grace Elizabeth =

American model (born 1997)

- Born: Grace Elizabeth Harry Cabe; March 18, 1997 (age 29); Lake City, Florida, U.S.
- Occupation: Model
- Years active: 2012–present
- Spouse: Nicolas Krause (m. 2020)
- Children: 2 boys
- Modeling information
- Height: 5 ft 10 in (1.78 m)
- Hair color: Brown
- Eye color: Hazel
- Agency: The Society Management (New York); Next Management (Paris, Milan, London, Los Angeles, Miami); MIKAs (Stockholm)

Grace Elizabeth Harry Cabe (born March 18, 1997) is an American fashion model who first gained recognition for her work with clothing company Guess. She began walking for the Victoria's Secret Fashion Show in 2016 and became a spokesmodel for their PINK brand. In 2019, she became a Victoria's Secret Angel. Cabe has appeared at 250 shows and has been on the cover of Vogue magazine 22 times.

== Career ==
When Elizabeth was 16, her mother sent her pictures to Next Model Management in Miami. Her parents considered it a financial investment. Next subsequently sent her to work in their New York City division. In 2015, she started out her modeling career with print campaigns for Guess and Polo Ralph Lauren. In February 2016, she made her runway debut in New York walking for Diane von Fürstenberg; that same season, she walked exclusively in Paris for Miu Miu, having been hand-selected by Miuccia Prada. In June 2016, she started regularly appearing in editorials for American Vogue. In November 2016, she made her debut in the Victoria's Secret Fashion Show and was announced as a spokesperson for PINK. She also walked the show in 2017 and 2018. In April 2019, she became a Victoria's Secret Angel.

In July 2017, she was photographed by Steven Meisel for two covers of Vogue Italia. She has also appeared on the cover of Vogue Russia (April 2017 and April 2018), Vogue España (May 2017), Vogue China (October 2017), Vogue México (December 2017), Vogue Deutsch (February 2018), Vogue Paris (March 2018) and Vogue Korea (June 2018). She landed her first American cover in early 2018 for V Magazine, posing alongside Sam Smith.

In 2017, she walked her first Chanel show. She closed the S/S 2018 show as well as the Pre-Fall 2018 show in Hamburg, Germany. She opened the F/W 2018 show of the brand. That year, she was photographed by Karl Lagerfeld for the Spring campaign of the brand. Elizabeth has also appeared in print campaigns for Versace, Michael Kors, Max Mara, Hugo Boss, Carolina Herrera, Tory Burch, Zara, Net-a-porter, Topshop and Gap. In May 2018, she was announced as the newest face of Estée Lauder.

She has walked for high fashion designers such as Michael Kors, Alexander Wang, Tommy Hilfiger, Carolina Herrera, Ralph Lauren, Oscar de la Renta, Tory Burch, Dolce & Gabbana, Missoni, Alberta Ferretti, Max Mara, Fendi, Versace, Moschino, Bottega Veneta, Stella McCartney, Giambattista Valli, Lanvin, Isabel Marant, Elie Saab, Mugler, Balmain and Chanel during the New York, Milan and Paris fashion weeks.

She has appeared in editorials for international editions of Vogue, Harper's Bazaar, Italian and Mexican Elle, Interview Magazine, V Magazine, W Magazine and Love Magazine.

== Personal life ==
She divides her time between New York City and her hometown of Lake City, Florida. She married German-born Nicolas Krause on March 19, 2020. In early 2021, their first child, a son, was born. In 2024, before returning to the Victoria's Secret Fashion Show, she gave birth to her second son.
