= Aiden Curtiss =

British-American fashion model (born 1998)

- Born: 14 February 1998 (age 28); Westminster, London, England,
- Occupation: Model
- Parents: Katoucha Niane; Nigel Curtiss
- Modeling information
- Height: 6 ft 0 in (183 cm)
- Hair color: Brown
- Eye color: Brown
- Agency: The Society Management (New York); Next Model Management (London); Elite Model Management (Paris, Milan); MIKAs (Stockholm)

Aiden Deborah A. H. Curtiss (born 14 February 1998) is a British-American fashion model.

== Early life ==
Curtiss was born in London, England, to Guinean-born model Katoucha Niane and menswear designer Nigel Curtiss. She moved to New York when she was 9.

She is the stepdaughter of Victoria's Secret EVP of Public Relations Monica Mitro.

== Career ==
Curtiss has modeled for Zac Posen, Maison Margiela, Marc Jacobs, Miu Miu, Stella McCartney, Dolce and Gabbana, Fendi, Balmain, Versace, Zuhair Murad, Roland Mouret, Thom Browne, Off-White, Anna Sui, Missoni, Prabal Gurung, and Bottega Veneta.

She has appeared in editorials for Vogue Italia, Vogue Japan, and Vogue Holland.

In 2017, for the first time she walked in the Victoria's Secret Fashion Show in Shanghai, China.
