= Maria Borges =

Angolan model (born 1992)

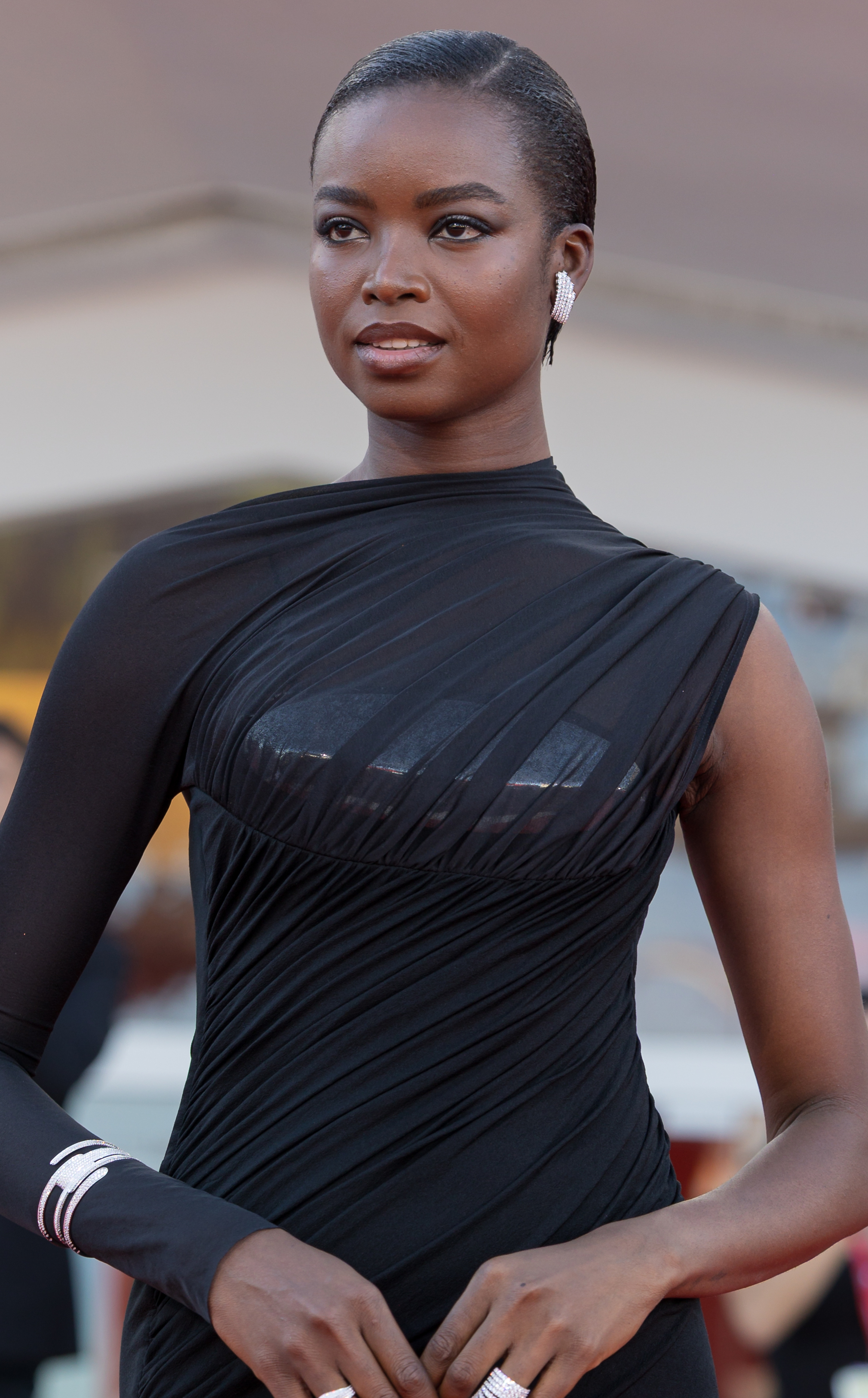
- Borges in 2025
- Born: 28 October 1992 (age 34); Luanda, Angola
- Occupation: Model
- Years active: 2010–present
- Known for: Victoria's Secret Fashion Show, 2013–17
- Children: 1
- Modeling information
- Height: 1.80 m (5 ft 11 in)
- Hair color: Black
- Eye color: Brown
- Agency: IMG Models (Worldwide); 20 Model Management (Cape Town); Mega Model Agency (Hamburg); Elite Model Management (Hong Kong); We Are Models (Lisboa); Way Model Management (Sao Paulo); MP Stockholm (Stockholm)

Maria Borges (born 28 October 1992) is an Angolan model. She was named Forbes Africa Magazine's top model of 2013. She is a Riccardo Tisci favorite and calls him her "godfather".

== Early life ==
Maria Borges was born in Luanda, Angola. She was discovered in 2010 when she placed second at the Angolan edition of the contest Elite Model Look.

== Career ==
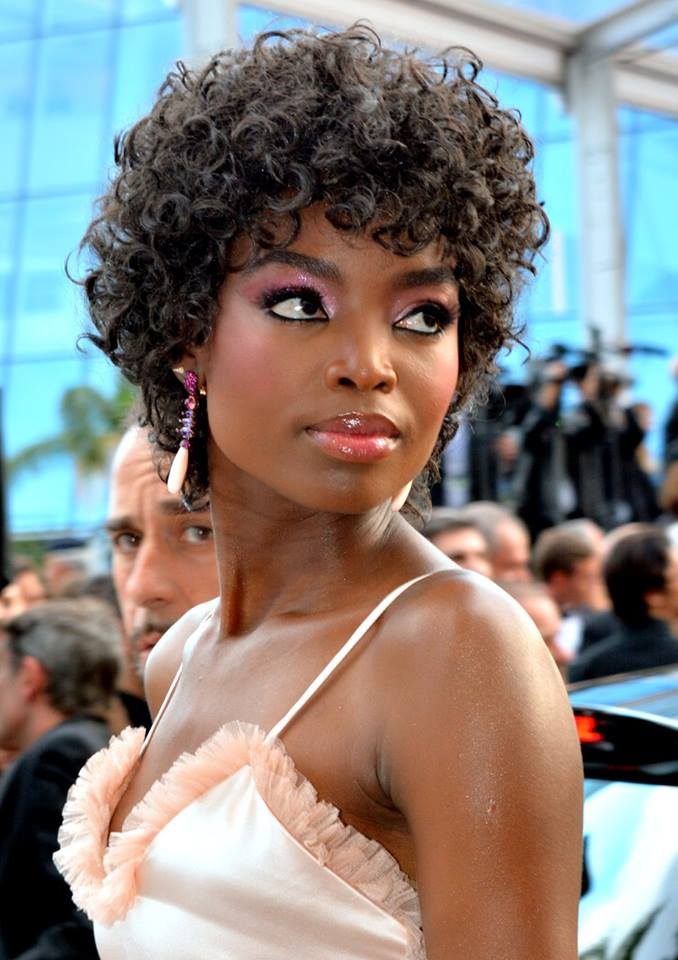
Borges at the 2018 Cannes film festival

In 2012, she signed with Supreme Agency. One month later, she debuted her first fashion week where she walked 17 runways. For her second season, she was a Givenchy exclusive. Borges has appeared in editorials for French, Italian, British, Spanish, German, and Portuguese Vogue, German and Australian Harper's Bazaar, Brazilian Marie Claire, French Numèro, V, W, i-D, and Interview.

In 2017, Maria Borges was the first African woman to feature on the cover of the American version of ELLE, 20 years after Sudanese model Alek Wek in 1997.

She has walked the runways for Anna Sui, Badgley Mischka, Balmain, Banana Republic, Blumarine, Carolina Herrera, Costello Tagliapietra, Custo Barcelona, Daks, Diane von Fürstenberg, Dior, Dsquared2, Elie Saab, Emanuel Ungaro, Emporio Armani, Erdem, Ermanno Scervino, Gianfranco Ferré, Giorgio Armani, Givenchy, Jason Wu, Jean Paul Gaultier, Jeremy Scott, Jonathan Saunders, Kenzo, Loewe, Marc Jacobs, Marchesa, Margaret Howell, Matthew Williamson, Max Mara, Maxime Simoens, Missoni, Monique L'huillier, Moschino, Naeem Khan, Narciso Rodriguez, Oscar de la Renta, Philipp Plein, Posche Design, Ports 1961, Prabal Gurung, Ralph Lauren, Ralph Rucci, Salvatore Ferragamo, Temperley, Tom Ford, Trussardi, Versace, Victoria's Secret, Vionnet, Wes Gordon and Zac Posen, among others.

Borges has appeared in the Victoria's Secret Fashion Show from 2013 to 2017.

She has appeared in campaigns for Givenchy, Tommy Hilfiger, H&M, Bobbi Brown, C&A, L'Oréal, Mac Cosmetics, and Forever 21.

== Personal life ==
In 2021, she gave birth to a daughter. As of January 2025, Borges is in a relationship with Italian businessman and former diplomat Paolo Zampolli.
