= Taylor Hill (model) =

American model (born 1996)

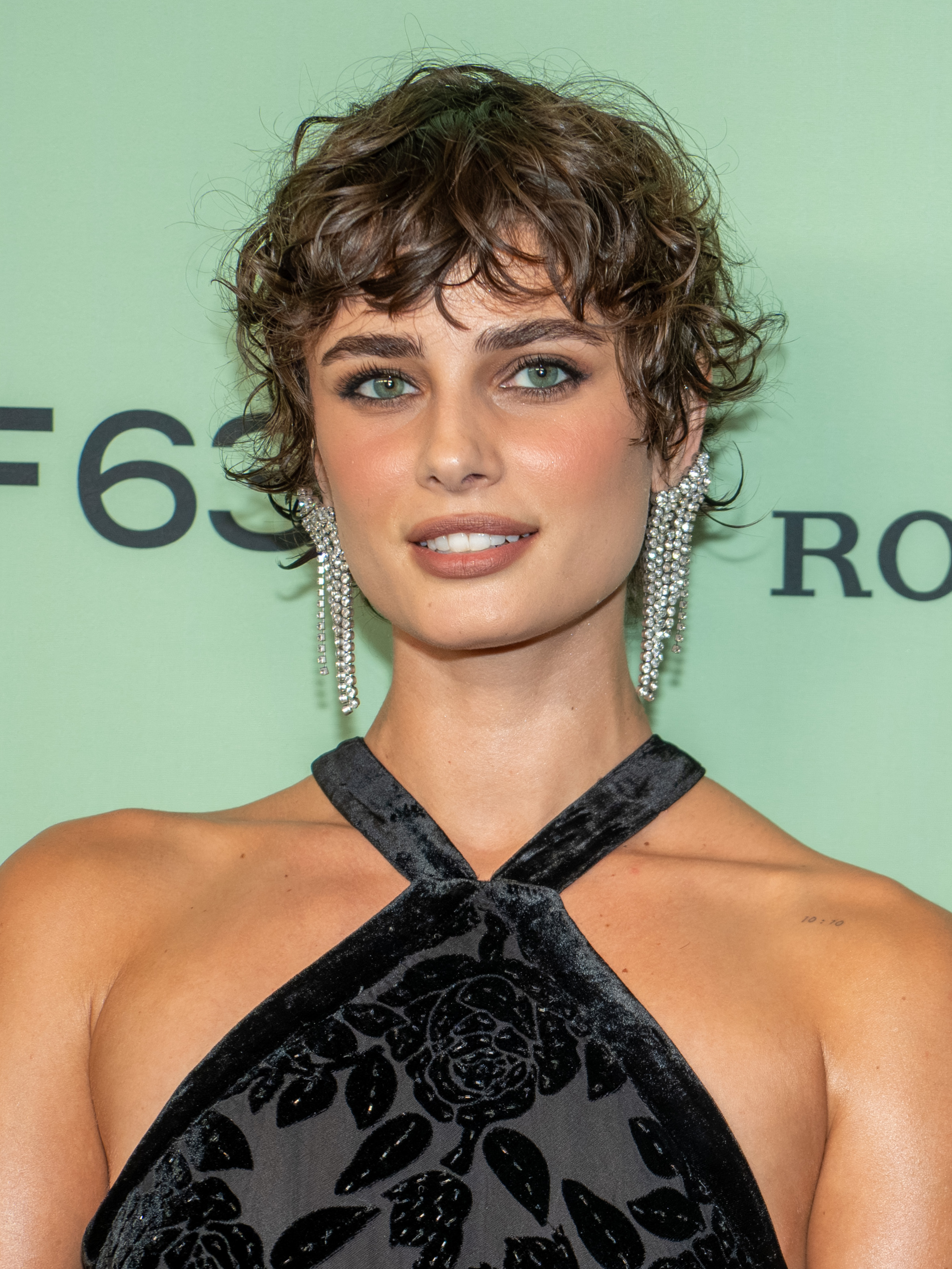
- Hill in 2025
- Born: Taylor Marie Hill; March 5, 1996 (age 30); Palatine, Illinois, U.S.
- Occupation: Model
- Years active: 2012–present
- Spouse: Daniel Fryer (m. 2023)
- Modeling information
- Height: 5 ft 10.5 in (1.79 m)
- Hair color: Brown
- Eye color: Green
- Agency: IMG Models (Worldwide); Modelwerk (Hamburg); Visage Management (Zurich); White Cross Management (Los Angeles)
- Website: https://www.taylorhill.com/

Taylor Marie Hill (born March 5, 1996) is an American model and actress. A former Victoria's Secret Angel, she appeared in the brand's annual fashion show from 2014 to 2018. She has worked for brands including Ralph Lauren, Michael Kors, and Carolina Herrera. She has also appeared in magazines such as Vogue, Elle, and Harper's Bazaar.

== Early life ==
Hill was born in Palatine, Illinois, and raised in Arvada, Colorado.

== Career ==
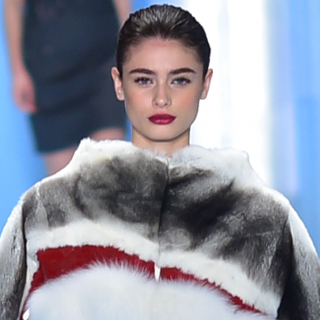
Hill in 2015

Hill was discovered in 2011 at the age of 14 by talent agent Jim Jordan at a ranch in Granby, Colorado where Hill and her family rode horses.

In 2013, she started out her modeling career when she was featured on Intimissimi's catalog. She has been in print campaigns for Forever 21.

In 2014 she modeled for H&M and walked the Victoria's Secret Fashion Show for the first time, the youngest model on their rotation at the age of 18. That year she became the face of Rosa Cha.

She was voted "2015's Most Promising Model" by Couturesque's readers. In 2015, she hosted an event for Victoria's Secret PINK. That same year she became a Victoria's Secret Angel. Also she advertised Versus Versace. In August 2015, she won "Model of the Year" in social media at Fashion Media Awards.

In 2016 made her debut at No. 17 on Forbes' "The World's Top-Earning Models" list, with estimated earnings of $4 million between 2015 and 2016. In July 2016, she was named as the new face of French beauty brand Lancôme.

She has appeared in editorials for the American, British, French, Spanish, Japanese, Arabian, Mexican and Turkish Vogue, Harper's Bazaar, the French, Dutch and Australian Elle, and other publications.

In 2016 her name has reached No. 9 with 3.6 million followers on the "Most Followed Models" list by Harper's Bazaar. She has 24.6 million Instagram followers as of December 2024.

After working in campaigns and photoshoots, she walked for high fashion designers Versace, Valentino, Chanel, Armani, Moschino, and others. She has been the face for advertisements of Jimmy Choo by Craig McDean, Michael Kors by Mario Testino, Topshop by Giampaolo Sgura, David Yurman by Bruce Weber and Joe's Jeans by Mario Sorrenti between 2016 and 2018.

Hill has also appeared in small roles in TV productions and films including The Broken Hearts Gallery, Dating and New York, and Babylon.

== Personal life ==
In June 2021, Hill announced that she was engaged to private equity investor Daniel Fryer. In June 2023, the couple got married in Winter Park, Colorado.

== Filmography ==
Film and television roles
Year	Title	Role	Notes
2016	The Neon Demon	Flirty Model #1	Film
2016	The Fashion Fund	Herself	Episode: "Winner Announced"
2019	Too Old to Die Young	Donna	Episode: "Volume 1: The Devil"
2020	The Broken Hearts Gallery	Taylor	Film
2021	Dating and New York	Olivia	Film
2021	Good on Paper	Chanterelle	Streaming film
2022	Babylon	Rebecca	Film
2024	Stealing Pulp Fiction	Rachel	Film
