= Romee Strijd =

Dutch model (born 1995)

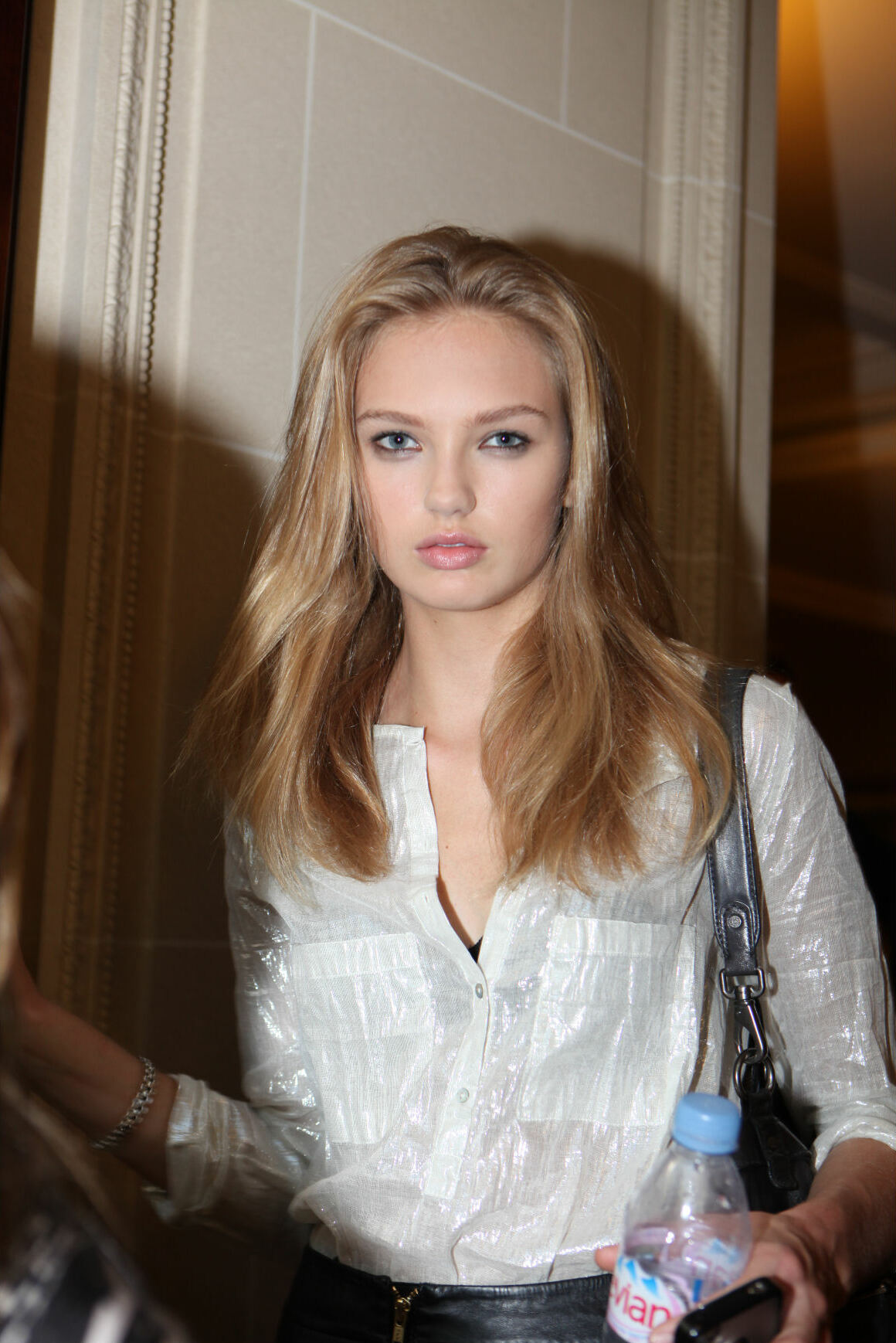
- Strijd in 2011
- Born: Romee Strijd; 19 July 1995 (age 31); Zoetermeer, Netherlands
- Occupation: Model
- Years active: 2008–present
- Spouse: Laurens van Leeuwen (Note: In 2020, the couple said that they got their marriage license in the United States but did not specify the exact date.)
- Children: 2
- Modeling information
- Height: 5 ft 11 1/2 in (1.82 m)
- Hair color: Blonde
- Eye color: Blue
- Agency: IMG Models (worldwide)

Romee Strijd (/ˈroʊmeɪ ˈstraɪd/ ROH-may STRYDE, Dutch: [ˈroːmeː ˈstrɛit]; born 19 July 1995) is a Dutch model. A former Victoria's Secret Angel, she appeared in the brand's annual fashion show from 2014 to 2018. She has worked for brands including Alexander McQueen, Michael Kors, and Carolina Herrera. She has also appeared in magazines such as Vogue, Elle, and Harper's Bazaar.

== Early life ==
Strijd was born in Zoetermeer, South Holland. She has one younger sister Ise Strijd. She was approached by a scout when she was 13 in Amsterdam and turned it down as she was too nervous and had other dreams. After two years, at 15, she wanted to give modelling a try and was signed to DNA model agency in 2011. She left school to pursue modelling, but returned at the age of 17 to the Netherlands to finish school because the career was overwhelming and she missed home. After time off from modelling she realized her love for modelling and moved to New York City after graduating.

== Career ==
=== Modeling ===
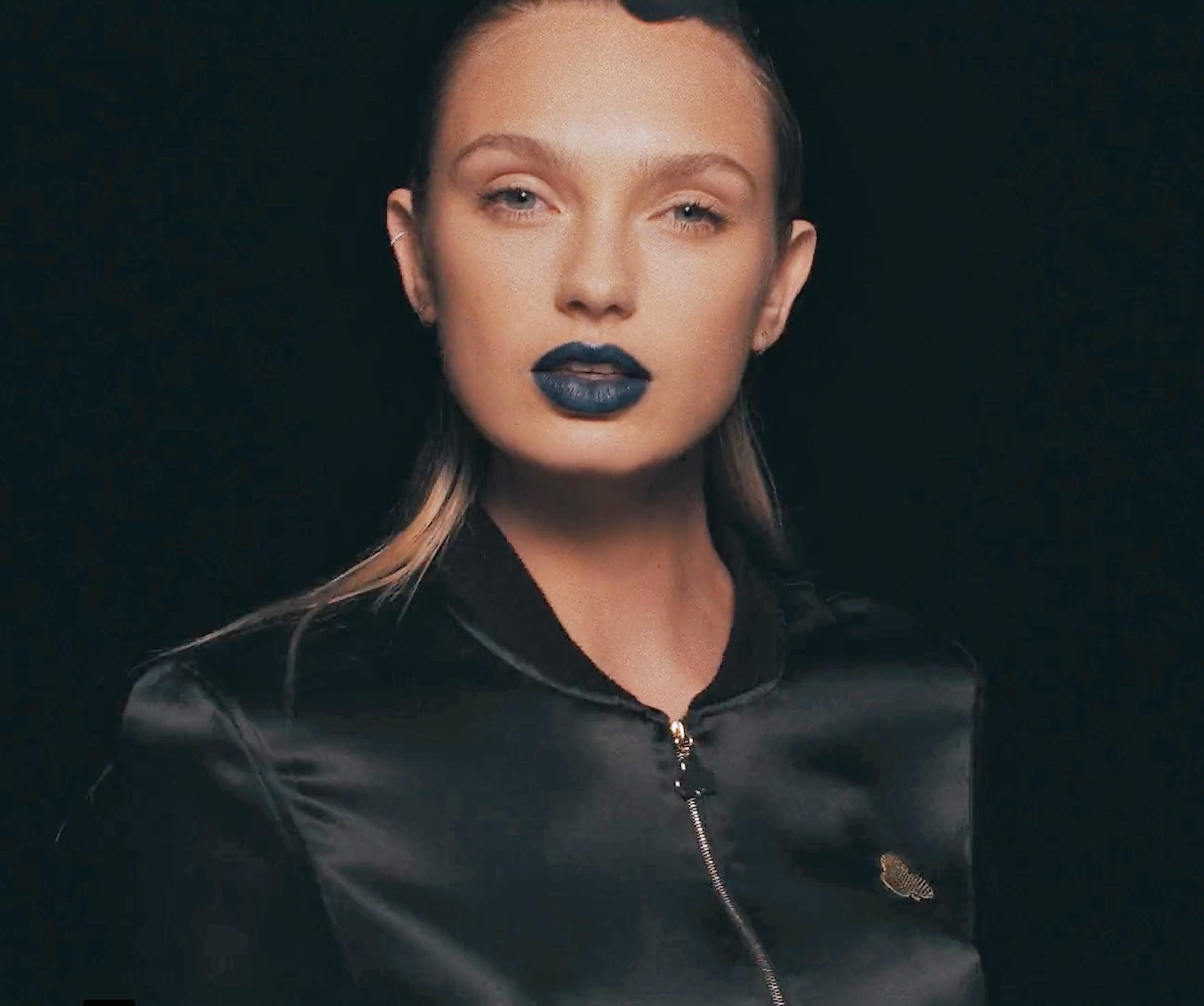
Strijd modeling for Chaos in 2016

Strijd signed with the DNA Model Management agency at 15 years old and worked for two years in Milan, Paris and New York City for brands like Burberry, Louis Vuitton and Prada before taking a break. She has appeared in editorials for British, German, Spanish, Turkish, Japanese and Dutch Vogue, French, Italian, and Dutch Elle, Spanish and Greek Harper's Bazaar, Dutch Marie Claire, and French Madame Figaro.

She has been on the cover of several versions of Vogue, Unconditional Magazine, Harper's Bazaar, Exit, Elle and Maxim (magazine). She posed 26 weeks pregnant on the cover of the November 2020 issue of Dutch Vogue, after She inspired the magazine to dedicate an issue to motherhood.

She has walked runway shows for Alexander McQueen, Badgley Mischka, Balmain, Burberry, Calvin Klein, Celine, Christopher Kane, DKNY, Jeremy Scott, Donna Karan, EDUN, Giambattista Valli, Hussein Chalayan, Isabel Marant, Jil Sander, Jill Stuart, Kenzo, Loewe, Louis Vuitton, Marchesa, Michael Kors, Nina Ricci, Peter Som, Phillip Lim, Prabal Gurung, Prada, Rag & Bone, Rochas, Roland Mouret, Vera Wang, Off White and Victoria's Secret.

She has appeared in campaigns for Carolina Herrera, Alexander McQueen, Donna Karan, Stradivarius, Michael Kors, Giuseppe Zanotti, H&M, Juicy Couture, Victoria's Secret, and Marchesa.

In 2014, she was chosen to be one of the newcomers at the Victoria's Secret Fashion Show. In 2015, she became a Victoria's Secret Angel, joining Karen Mulder and Doutzen Kroes as the third Dutch to earn the coveted title. In March 2017 she announced that she was now represented by IMG Models.

In 2018, She was chosen to wear the Shooting Star Swarovski Look in the Victoria's Secret Fashion Show. In 2018, she became a brand ambassador for popular Australian swimwear brand Seafolly.

=== YouTube ===
Strijd started her YouTube channel on 16 July 2017 where she posts vlogs, behind-the-scenes, and beauty content. As of 2023, the channel has reached 1.86 million subscribers and a total of 190 million views.

== Personal life ==
Since January 2010, Strijd has been in a relationship with Laurens van Leeuwen, son of television presenter Bert van Leeuwen. The couple announced their engagement on 25 January 2022. The pair has since gotten their marriage certificate in the United States and plan on eventually having a formal wedding.

In May 2020, Strijd and van Leeuwen announced they were expecting their first child, a girl. Their daughter, Mint, was born on 2 December 2020. She also revealed that she struggled with polyendocrine metabolic ovarian syndrome (PMOS) for years, claiming that her weight and high-intensity workouts due to her modeling career were not good for her body, and that after she started taking better care of her health, she finally got her period back after seven years without one. In May 2022, Strijd and Van Leeuwen announced they were expecting their second child. In June, she announced she was expecting another baby girl. Their second daughter, June, was born on 11 November 2022.
