= Martha Hunt =

American model (born 1989)

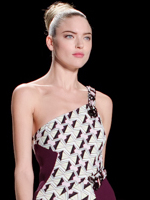
- Hunt in 2014
- Born: April 27, 1989 (age 37); Wilson, North Carolina, U.S.
- Occupation: Model
- Years active: 2007–present
- Known for: Free People spokesmodel Victoria's Secret Angel
- Partner: Jason McDonald (eng. 2020)
- Children: 1
- Modeling information
- Height: 5 ft 10 1/2 in (1.79 m)
- Hair color: Blonde
- Eye color: Blue
- Agency: IMG Models

Martha Hunt (born April 27, 1989) is an American model. She is best known for her work as a Victoria's Secret Angel. She is also a spokesmodel for Free People.

== Early life ==
Martha Hunt was born and raised in the city of Wilson, North Carolina.

== Career ==
After hearing about a model search on a local radio station, Hunt attended the event in Charlotte, North Carolina. She received many callbacks from numerous agencies. At the model search, Hunt was specifically discovered by a photographer who introduced her to agencies in New York. She moved there and signed with IMG Models.

Her first runway work was in 2007, at Paris Fashion Week, where she walked for Issey Miyake. In 2009, she was on the cover of Vogue China and Harper's Bazaar, GQ, Revue des Modes, V, Glamour Germany, and Muse. She has walked for Tracy Reese, J. Mendel, Wayne, and Rebecca Taylor.

She has walked more than 180 fashion shows, including Acne, Balmain, Carolina Herrera, Castelbajac, Chanel, Christopher Kane, Diane Von Furstenberg, Dolce & Gabbana, Fátima Lopes, Giorgio Armani, Givenchy, Hervé Léger, Issey Miyake, Jason Wu, Jefen, Louis Vuitton, Marchesa, Miu Miu, Oscar de la Renta, Prada, rag & bone, Ralph Lauren, Stella McCartney, Tory Burch, Ramy Brook, and Versace. In 2010 and 2011, she was featured in Velour, Marie Claire Italia, Vogue Russia, Harper's Bazaar, and Allure, as well as advertisements for BCBG Max Azria, Y-3, Hugo Boss, and Via Spiga.

She signed with IMG Models in 2012, during which she also posed for Pennyblack, Jason Wu, and Victoria's Secret, was featured on the cover of Elle, and was selected for LOVE magazine's 2012 video advent calendar.

In 2013, she was featured in commercials for Miu Miu, Santa Lolla, Max&Co (with Frida Gustavsson), Express, Ralph Lauren, Prada, rag & bone, and Juicy Couture. She also posed for many magazines including Wonderland, V, Harper's Bazaar, Vogue, 25, Numéro, and Elle Australia. Since 2013 she has represented the brand Free People, which has featured her in several commercials and photoshoots.

In 2014, she posed for Rebecca Minkoff and for the magazines Marie Claire Italy, Glamour Germany, Stonefox, and Lui. She walked for Tome, Jason Wu, Cushnie et Ochs, Hervé Léger, Carolina Herrera, Polo Ralph Lauren, and Jeremy Scott. She did an entry about the Coachella Music Festival in Vanity Fair UK. She was featured in Victoria's Secret's catalogue in early 2013 and walked her first Victoria's Secret Fashion Show in 2013. In 2014, she was credited. In 2015, she was part of the first Victoria's Secret Swim Special and became an Angel.

== Personal life ==
Hunt has a diagnosis of scoliosis. Speaking of her surgical scars, Hunt had stated "Scars are uniquely beautiful, and they tell a triumphant story about you. I have a long one down my back, and one on my lower right abdomen." In January 2020, she announced her engagement to photographer Jason McDonald. On June 18, 2021, Hunt and McDonald announced that they were expecting a child. Their daughter was born on November 6, 2021. Hunt is a fan of Duke Blue Devils basketball.

== Filmography ==
=== Films ===
Year	Title	Role	Director
2020	Miss Americana	Herself	Lana Wilson

=== Television ===
Year	Title	Role	Notes
2014	2 Broke Girls	Herself	Episode: "And the Model Apartment"
2019	Celebrity Family Feud	Herself	Episode: Season 5, Episode 03

=== Music videos ===
Year	Title	Artist	Role	Ref
2015	"Bad Blood"	Taylor Swift	Homeslice	
2015	"Hands to Myself" (Victoria's Secret version)	Selena Gomez	Herself	
2017	"Paris"	The Chainsmokers	Herself	
