= Lais Ribeiro =

Brazilian model (born 1989)

Laís Ribeiro
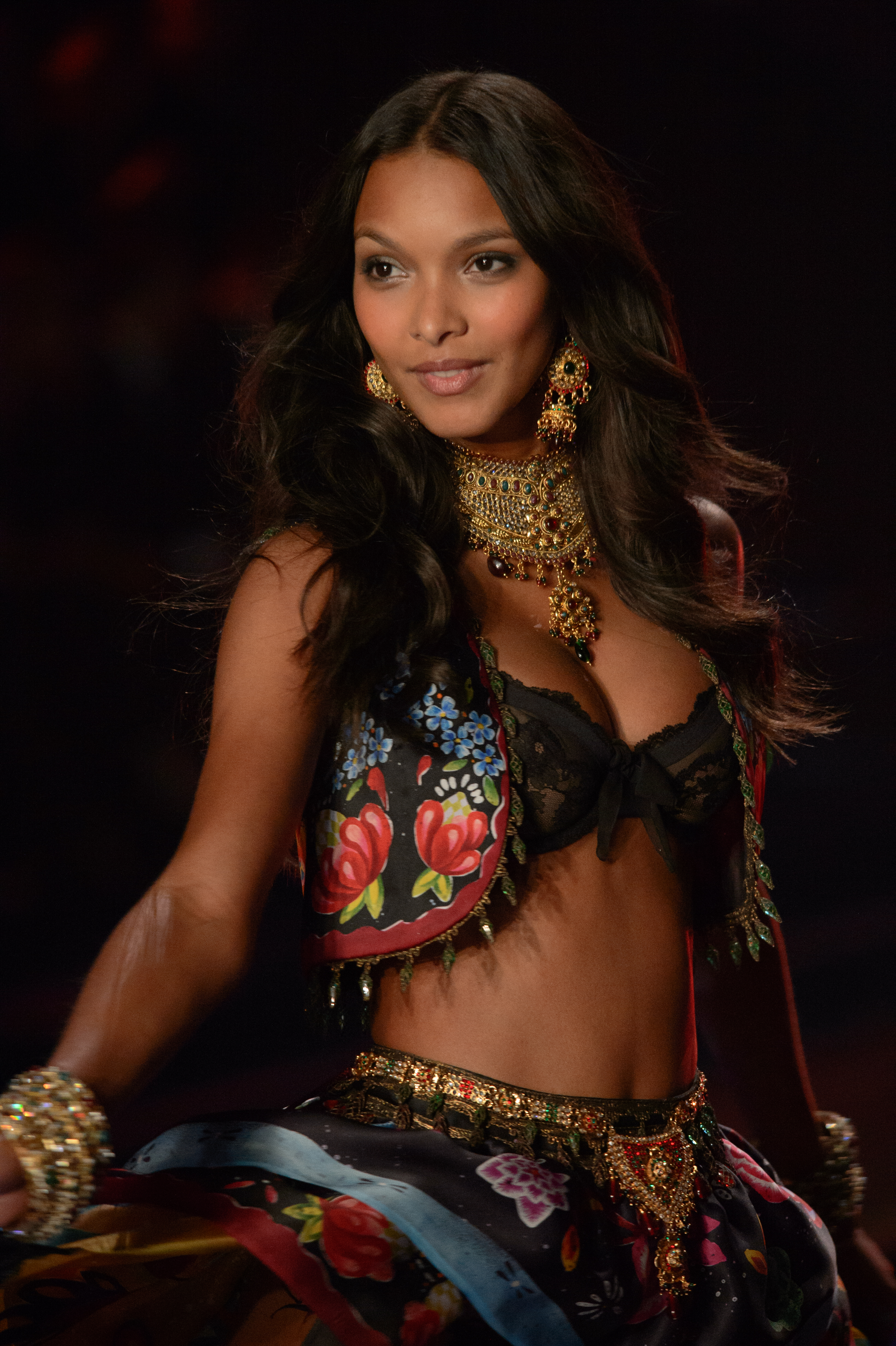
- Ribeiro at the 2014 Victoria's Secret Fashion Show in London
- Born: Laís Pereira de Oliveira; 5 October 1989 (age 37); Miguel Alves, Piauí, Brazil
- Occupation: Model
- Years active: 2010-present
- Spouse: Joakim Noah (m. 2022)
- Children: 2
- Modeling information
- Height: 6 ft 0 in (1.82 m)
- Hair color: Brown
- Eye color: Brown
- Agency: Women Management (New York, Paris); Monster Management (Milan); Next Model Management (London); Traffic Models (Barcelona); IMM Bruxelles (Brussels); Joy Model Management (São Paulo)

Laís Ribeiro (born Laís Pereira de Oliveira; 5 October 1989) is a Brazilian model known for her work as a Victoria's Secret Angel.

== Career ==
Prior to becoming a model, Ribeiro was in training to become a nurse.

She has walked for Dolce & Gabbana, Givenchy, and Gucci, among many others. Ribeiro has featured in editorials for various international versions of Elle, Harper's Bazaar, and Vogue, as well as featuring in GQ, Maxim, and the Sports Illustrated Swimsuit Issue.

She also works for Victoria's Secret and has appeared in several of their fashion shows, adverts, and catalogues. In 2015, Ribeiro, was named as one of their Angels and in 2017, was chosen to wear their Fantasy Bra—the $2,000,000 Champagne Nights bra designed by Mouawad, featuring: handset diamonds, yellow sapphires, and blue topaz in 18 karat gold—during their fashion show.

== Personal life ==
In May 2008, Ribeiro gave birth to her son, and in 2013, he received an autism diagnosis.

In 2014, she began dating American basketball player Jared Homan. In September 2018, she began dating NBA player Joakim Noah, and a year later they became engaged. On 13 July 2022, Ribeiro and Noah were married in Trancoso in her native country Brazil. Noah's first and Ribeiro's second child was born in 2024.

== See also ==
- List of Afro-Latinos
