= List of Vogue Nederland cover models =

This list of Vogue Nederland cover models (2012–present) is a catalog of cover models who have appeared on the cover of Vogue Nederland, the Dutch edition of American fashion magazine Vogue.

== 2010s ==
=== 2012 ===
Issue	Cover model	Photographer
April	Romee Strijd; Ymre Stiekema; Josefien Rodermans	Marc de Groot
May	Lara Stone	Josh Olins
June	Guinevere Van Seenus	Annemarieke van Drimmelen
July/August	Rianne ten Haken	Petrovsky & Ramone
September	Ymre Stiekema	Paul Bellaart
October	Saskia de Brauw	Jan Welters
November	Anna de Rijk	Marc de Groot
December	Doutzen Kroes	Patrick Demarchelier

=== 2013 ===
Issue	Cover model	Photographer
January/February	Agnes Nabuurs	Erwin Olaf
March	Bette Franke	Alique
April	Milou van Groesen	Alique
May	Erin Wasson	Petrovsky & Ramone
June	Doutzen Kroes	Josh Olins
July	Kinee Diouf	Ishi
August	Dewi Driegen, Kasia Struss	Philippe Vogelenzang
September	Doutzen Kroes	Paul Bellaart
October	Ymre Stiekema	Alique
November	Marte Mei van Haaster	Alique
December	Justine Bakker; Agnes Nabuurs; Sylvia van der Klooster; Charon Cooijmans; Cato van Ee	Philippe Vogelenzang

=== 2014 ===
Issue	Cover model	Photographer
January/February	Crista Cober	Marc de Groot
March	Marique Schimmel	Marc de Groot
April	Sylvie Meis	Paul Bellaart
May	Doutzen Kroes	Duy Vo
June	Ymre Stiekema	Nico Bustos
July/August	Małgosia Bela	Annemarieke van Drimmelen
September	Lara Stone	Angelo Pennetta
October	Karlie Kloss	Alique
November	Cato van Ee	Paul Bellaart
December	Amanda Wellsh	Alique

=== 2015 ===
Issue	Cover model	Photographer
January/February	Daphne Groeneveld	Nico Bustos
March	Doutzen Kroes	Jan Welters; Nico Bustos; Paul Bellaart
April	Ine Neefs; Julia Bergshoeff; Maartje Verhoef	Alique
May	Crista Cober, Michiel Huisman	Marc de Groot
June	Julia Bergshoeff	Josh Olins
July/August	Nimue Smit	Marc de Groot
September	Imaan Hammam	Marc de Groot
October	Andreea Diaconu	Annemarieke van Drimmelen
November	Gigi Hadid	Alique
December	Marte Mei van Haaster	Viktor & Rolf

=== 2016 ===
Issue	Cover model	Photographer
January/February	Rianne van Rompaey	Nico Bustos
March	Bette Franke	Marc de Groot
April	Doutzen Kroes	Duy Vo
May	Romee Strijd	Quentin de Briey
June	Julia Bergshoeff	Annemarieke van Drimmelen
July/August	Dafne Schippers	Marc de Groot
September	Vera van Erp	Claudia Knoepfel
October	Lara Stone	Peter Lindbergh
November	Hana Jiříčková	Alique
December	Bette Franke	Marc de Groot

=== 2017 ===
Issue	Cover model	Photographer
January/February	Cato van Ee	Paul Bellaart
March	Marjan Jonkman	Marc de Groot
April	Doutzen Kroes & Lara Stone	Mario Testino
May	Gigi Hadid	Serge Leblon
June	Romee Strijd	Jan Welters
July/August	Victoria Beckham	Jan Welters
September	Kim van der Laan; Kishana John; Nirvana Naves; Nandy Nicodeme; Meta Gewald	Paul Bellaart
October	Imaan Hammam	Alique
November	Natasha Poly	Alique
December	Alexa Chung	Marc de Groot

=== 2018 ===
Issue	Cover model	Photographer
January/February	Rose Bertram	Marc de Groot
March	Luna Bijl	Richard Burbridge
April	Yasmin Wijnaldum	Marc de Groot
May	Dilone	Giampaolo Sgura
June	Annely Bouma	Paul Bellaart
July/August	Roos van Elk	Annemarieke van Drimmelen
September	Birgit Kos; Kiki Willems; Yasmin Wijnaldum	Quentin de Briey
October	Dominique Schemmekes; Jelizah Rose; Jesiah Dox; Anouk; Phoenix Ray; Benjahmin Kingsley; Elijah Jeramiah; Sion Jethro	Marc de Groot
November	Birgit Kos	Alique
December	Kätlin Aas	Tung Walsh

=== 2019 ===
Issue	Cover model	Photographer
January/February	Veronika Heilbrunner	Tung Walsh
March	Lara Stone	Matteo Montanari
April	Imaan Hammam	Bibi Cornejo Borthwick
May	Doutzen Kroes	Daniel Jackson
June	Yasmin Wijnaldum	Tung Walsh
July/August	Sylvia Hoeks	Daniël Bouquet
September	Luna Bijl & Birgit Kos	Carlijn Jacobs
October	Felice Noordhoff	Julia Marino
October	Jill Kortleve	Scott Trindle
November	Bella Hadid	Sean Thomas
December	Anna de Rijk	Gregory Harris

== 2020s ==
=== 2020 ===
Issue	Cover model	Photographer
January/February	Sylvia van der Klooster	Claudia Knoepfel
March	Anok Yai	Julia Noni
April	Mica Argañaraz	Willy Van Der Perre
May	Marwan Kenzari; Nora Ponse; Georgina Verbaan; Maartje Wortel	Yaniv Edry
June	Yahaira Gezius; Danielle van Grondelle; Nella Roz; Anna de Rijk; Bente Oort; Julie Hoomans; Cato Van Ee; Ayesha Djwala; Nikki Tissen	Ferry van der Nat
July/August	Amber Valletta	Annemarieke Van Drimmelen
September	Jill Kortleve	Casper Kofi
October	Nechaira Hooten; Irene Plange; Lucy Hanna	Anuschka Blommers and Niels Schumm
November	Romee Strijd	Jesse John Jenkins
December	Felice Nova Noordhoff	Gregory Harris

=== 2021 ===
Issue	Cover model	Photographer
January/February	Bodil Ouédruogo; Keanna Williams; Lydia Kloos; Joy Delima; Dantè Kedde; Nora El Koussour; Gaidaa	Julia Marino
March	Maty Fall	Julia Noni
April	Merlijne Schorren	Ferry van der Nat
May	Lauren Ernwein	Philippine Chaumont and Agathe Zaerpour
June	Vivienne Rohner	Hill & Aubrey
July/August	Luna Bijl	Charles Negre

=== 2022 ===
Issue	Cover model	Photographer
March	Jill Kortleve	Gregory Harris
April	Parker Van Noord & Felice Nova Noordhoff	Casper van der Linden
May	Nella Ngingo & Arantxa Oosterwolde	Marc de Groot
June	Negin Mirsalehi	Jouke Bos
July/August	Barbara Valente	Matteo Montanari
September	Rianne van Rompaey	Viviane Sassen
October	Muna Muhamed	Casper van der Linden
November	Precious Lee	Julia Marino
December	Lara Stone; Linda Spierings	Philippe Vogelenzang

=== 2023 ===
Issue	Cover model	Photographer
January/February	Kelly Piquet	Arran & Jules
March	Gigi Hadid	Alana O'Herlihy
April	Alek Wek	Sean Thomas
May	Mila van Eeten	Casper van der Linden
June	Corey Mylcheerst & India Amateifio	Jasper Abels
July/August	Karel Gerlach & Maan de Steenwinkel	Marie Wynants
September	Felice Noordhoff	Luigi & Iango
October	Nyaueth Riam	Arran & Jules
November	Winnie Harlow	Nikki Esser
December	Karen Elson	Agata Serge
December	Sasha Pivovarova	Agata Serge
December	Amanda Murphy	Agata Serge

=== 2024 ===
Issue	Cover model	Photographer
January/February	Malika El Maslouhi	Lemmie van den Berg
March	Annemary Aderibigbe; Jean Campbell; Mathilda Gvarliani; Maty Fall	Jorin Koers
April	Irina Shayk	Luigi & Iango
May	Stella Lucia	Kate Bellm
June	Peggy Gou	Marie Wynants
July/August	Heather Kemesky and Imre van Opstal	Cass Bird
September	Doutzen Kroes	Lachlan Bailey
October	Małgosia Bela	Nathaniel Goldberg
November	Kilian Smits	Marc de Groot
November	Marilou Hanriot	Jorin Koers
November	Malika El Maslouhi	Rasmus Weng Karlsen
November	Georgia Palmer	Kate Bellm
November	Anita Pozzo	Liselore Chevalier
December	Ugbad Abdi	Wikkie Hermkens

=== 2025 ===
Issue	Cover model	Photographer
January/February	Jill Kortleve	Walter Pierre
March	Farhiya Shire, Senna Vet, Gwen Weijers, Farah Nieuwburg, Ilya Vermeulen	Zoe Karssen
April	Parker van Noord, Bess van Noord	Viviane Sassen
May	Dorit Revelis	Jorin Koers
June	Amelie Lens	Rasmus Weng Karlsen
July/August	Yasmin Wijnaldum	Rasmus Weng Karlsen
September	Imaan Hammam	Lachlan Bailey
October	Gia Bab	Rasmus Weng Karlsen
November	Merlijne Schorren	Jorin Koers
December	Sakua Kambong, Marjan Jonkman, Cato	Kate Bellm

=== 2026 ===
Issue	Cover model	Photographer
January/February	Mia Armstrong	Jorin Koers
March	Caitlin Soetendal	Cass Bird
April	Saskia de Brauw	Inez & Vinoodh
April	Marte Mei Van Haaster	Inez & Vinoodh
April	Imaan Hammam	Inez & Vinoodh
April	Jill Kortleve	Inez & Vinoodh
April	Felice Nova Noordhoff	Inez & Vinoodh
April	Rianne van Rompaey	Inez & Vinoodh
April	Lara Stone	Inez & Vinoodh
April	Christiaan Houtenbos; Jop van Bennekom; Apollonia van Ravenstein; Sylvia Hoeks; Ulrika Lundgren; Dana Lixenberg; Marcel Musters; Lonneke Gordijn; Rushemy Botter; Lisi Herrebrugh; Marja Samsom; Jodokus Driessen; Jessica Ottersberg; Charles Matadin; Sabine Marcelis; Frans Ankoné; Linda Spierings; Marte Mei van Haaster; Eddy De Clercq; Imaan Hammam; Narda van't Veer; Paul Kooiker; Viktor Horsting; Rolf Snoeren; Saskia de Brauw; Duran Lantink; Parker van Noord; Ronald van der Kemp; Sil Bruinsma; Anton Corbijn; Daria Birang; Princess Mabel van Oranje; Felice Nova Noordhoff; Rineke Dijkstra; Rianne van Rompaey; Alique; Fritz Kok; Halina Reijn; Jill Kortleve; Iris van Herpen; Lara Stone; Maarten Baas; Jasper Bode; Marjan Jonkman; Ward Stegerhoek	Inez & Vinoodh
May	Elina Gunawardena	Zoe Karssen
June	Paula Soares	Kate Bellm
July/August	Tess Summer Carter	Jorin Koers
September	Rosalieke Fuchs; Caitlin Soetendal; Annemary Aderbridge	Josh Olins
October	Anja Rubik	Zoe Karrsen
November	Arizona Muse, Cy Verney-Carron	Kate Bellm
December	Ivy Stewart	Pierre Walter
