= Victoria's Secret Fashion Show 2026 =

Annual fashion show of an US brand

- Status: Active
- Genre: Fashion show
- Date: October 18, 2026
- Frequency: Annually
- Venue: Sony Pictures Studios
- Locations: Los Angeles, United States
- Years active: 1995–2003, 2005–2018, 2024–present
- Inaugurated: August 1, 1995
- Most recent: 2026
- Previous event: 2025
- Next event: 2027
- Member: Victoria's Secret
- Website: Victoria's Secret Fashion Show

The Victoria's Secret Fashion Show is an annual fashion show sponsored by Victoria's Secret, an American brand of lingerie and sleepwear. Victoria's Secret uses the show to promote and market its goods in high-profile settings. The show featured former Victoria's Secret Angels Adriana Lima, Alessandra Ambrosio, Behati Prinsloo, Candice Swanepoel, Doutzen Kroes, Rosie Huntington-Whiteley, Elsa Hosk, Jasmine Tookes, Barbara Palvin, Grace Elizabeth, and also veteran Victoria's Secret models Caroline Trentini, Liu Wen, Joan Smalls, Cindy Bruna, Ming Xi, Imaan Hammam, Gigi Hadid, Bella Hadid, Irina Shayk, Gizele Oliveira, and Yasmin Wijnaldum; leading fashion models Anok Yai, Alex Consani, Ashley Graham, Paloma Elsesser, Devyn Garcia, Vittoria Ceretti, Amelia Gray, Abby Champion, Precious Lee, and Yumi Nu; as well as Solange Omon, the winner of "Angels Among Us," a Victoria's Secret docuseries documenting the brand's nationwide search for its newest "Angel."

On July 16, 2026, Victoria's Secret announced that the fashion show would be returning to Los Angeles after 19 years.

The 2026 Victoria's Secret Fashion Show was livestreamed from Los Angeles at Sony Pictures Studios, on October 18. The show featured musical performances by Katseye, Megan Moroney, Megan Thee Stallion, and Tate McRae.

== Highlights ==
This event featured the return of the famous Fantasy Bra—valued at $50 million, making it the most expensive in the history of the fashion shows—after an eight-year hiatus. It was showcased by American model and entrepreneur Kylie Jenner, who was making her runway debut; however, this choice drew some criticism, as many felt the piece should have been worn by an experienced model with a prior history of working with the brand. The event also highlighted the twentieth runway appearance of Brazilian model Alessandra Ambrosio, who was honored during the show.

Dates	Locations	Broadcaster	Viewers (millions)	Performers
October 18, 2026 (aired)	Los Angeles	YouTube	3.64	Katseye, Megan Moroney, Megan Thee Stallion, and Tate McRae

== Fashion show segments ==
=== Segment 1: Spring Awakening ===
Performer	Song	Status
(United States) FLO	"Leak It"	Remixed recording
(United States) Slayyyter	"Dance..."	Remixed recording
(United States) Britney Spears	"Get Naked (I Got A Plan)"	Remixed recording
(United States) Garbage	"Only Happy When It Rains"	Remixed recording
(United States) Bebe Rexha	"Hysteria"	Remixed recording

Nationality	Model	Wings	Runway Shows	Status
(United States) American	Bella Hadid	꒰১ ໒꒱	2016–2018 • 2024–present	
(South Sudan) South Sudanese	Anok Yai		2024–present	
(Brazil) Brazilian	Adriana Lima	꒰১ ໒꒱	1999–2003 • 2005–2008 • 2010–2018 • 2024–present	Former VS 2 Angel (2000–2018)
(South Africa) South African	Candice Swanepoel		2007–2015 • 2017–2018 • 2024–present	Former VS 4 Angel (2010–2021)
(United Kingdom) British	Paloma Elsesser	꒰১ ໒꒱	2024–present	
(Brazil) Brazilian	Caroline Trentini		2005–2006 • 2009 • 2026	
(United States) American	Grace Elizabeth		2016-2018 • 2024–present	Former VS 5 Angel (2019-2021)
(China) Chinese	Ming Xi		2013–2018 • 2026	Former VS C Angel (2018–2019)
(United States) American	Abby Champion		2025–present	
(United States) American	Devyn Garcia		2024–present	
(Brazil) Brazilian	Alessandra Ambrosio		2000–2003 • 2005–2017 • 2024–present	Former VS 2 Angel (2004–2017)
(United States) American	Ashley Graham	꒰১ ໒꒱	2024–present	
(United States) American	Alex Consani		2024–present	
(Sweden) Swedish	Elsa Hosk		2011–2018 • 2026	Former VS 5 Angel (2015–2020)
(Netherlands) Dutch	Doutzen Kroes	꒰১ ໒꒱	2005–2006 • 2008–2009 • 2011–2014 • 2024–present	Former VS 3 Angel (2008–2014)

=== Segment 2: Vintage Victoria ===
Performer	Song	Status
(United States) Megan Moroney	"6 Months Later"	Live performance
(United States) Megan Moroney	"Wish I Didn't"	Live performance
(United States) Megan Moroney	"Sorry... I Meant Tonight"	Live performance

Nationality	Model	Runway Shows	Status
(Netherlands) Dutch (China) Chinese	Rosalieke Fuchs; He Cong	2026; 2024 • 2026	
(Guadeloupe) Guadeloupean (Italy) Italian	Tara Falla; Malika El Maslouhi	2026	
(Spain) Spaniard (Georgia (country)) Georgian	Cala Morages; Mathilda Gvarliani	2026; 2024–present	
(Russia) Russian	Irina Shayk	2016 • 2024–present	
(Brazil) Brazilian (Sri Lanka) Sri Lankan	Gizele Oliveira; Elina Gunawardena	2017–2018 • 2026; 2026	
(Netherlands) Dutch	Felice Nova	2026	
(India) Indian (United States) American	Ravleen Varghese; Yumi Nu	2026; 2025–present	
(United States) American	Luna Yohannan; Shamari Koharu	2025–present 2026	
(United States) American	Precious Lee	2025–present	
(United States) American	Emma Jette; Nanabah Grace	2026	
(United States) American (Brazil) Brazilian	Bertie Salazar; Luíza Perote	2026	
(United States) American (Australia) Australian	Bam Leasure; Ayen Agany	2026	
(Hungary) Hungarian	Barbara Palvin	2012 • 2018 • 2024–present	Former VS 5 Angel (2019–2021)

=== Segment 3: Summer Fever ===
Performer	Song	Status
(Canada) Tate McRae	"Housewife"	Live performance
(Canada) Tate McRae	"Dear God"	Live performance
(Canada) Tate McRae	"Sports Car"	Live performance
(Canada) Tate McRae	"Nobody's Girl"	Remixed recording

Nationality/Ethinicity	Model	Wings	Runway Shows	Status
(United States) American	Gigi Hadid	꒰১ ໒꒱	2015–2016 • 2018 • 2024–present	
(France) French	Cindy Bruna		2013–2018 • 2026	
(Puerto Rico) Puerto Rican	Joan Smalls	꒰১ ໒꒱	2011–2016 • 2024–present	
(Netherlands) Dutch	Yasmin Wijnaldum	꒰১ ໒꒱	2018 • 2025–present	
(Namibia) Namibian	Behati Prinsloo	꒰১ ໒꒱	2007–2015 • 2018 • 2024–present	Former VS 3 Angel (2009–2019)
(United Kingdom) British	Neelam Gill		2024–present	
(United States) American	Jasmine Tookes	꒰১ ໒꒱	2012–2018 • 2024–present	Former VS 5 Angel (2015–2021)
(Brazil) Brazilian (South Sudan) South Sudanese	Daiane Sodre; Abény Nhial		2025–present	
(United States) American	Amelia Gray		2025–present	
(South Africa) South African	Candice Swanepoel		2007–2015 • 2017–2018 • 2024–present	Former VS 4 Angel (2010–2021)
(Canada) Canadian	Awar Odhiang	꒰১ ໒꒱	2024–present	
(France) Réunionese	Emeline Hoareau	꒰১ ໒꒱	2025–present	
(Netherlands) Dutch	Imaan Hammam	꒰১ ໒꒱	2014 • 2024–present	

=== Segment 4: PINK Halftime Show ===
Performer	Song	Status
(United States) Katseye	"Pinky Up"	Live performance
(United States) Rhea Raj	"Dream Girl"	Remixed recording
(United States) Katseye	"Animal"	Live performance

Nationality/Ethinicity	Model	Runway Shows	Status
(United States) American	Trinity Rodman	2026	
(United States) American	Natalia Bryant	2026	
(Brazil) Brazilian	Gabriela Moura	2025–present	
(South Korea) South Korean	Yoon Young–bae	2025–present	
(United States) American	Summer Dirx	2025–present	
(Democratic Republic of the Congo) Congolese	Christine Bashombana	2026	
(United Kingdom) British (United States) American	Christina Nadin; Jordan Leftwich	2026	
(United States) American	Sydney Waits	2026	
(Germany) German	Lena Mantler	2026	
(United States) American	Marlee Guillory; Presley Kiffin	2026	
(Colombia) Colombian	Honey Ordoñez	2026	
(United Kingdom) British	Iris Law	2025–present	
(China) Chinese	Yue Gu	2026	
(United States) American	Breanna Ivy	2026	
(United States) American	Quenlin Blackwell	2025–present	

=== Segment 5: Autumn Change ===
Performer	Song	Status
(Australia) Fisher	"Stay"	Remixed Recording
(Cuba) Eutimio	"Breaking Aria"	Remixed Recording
(United Kingdom) Cassim (United Kingdom) Mahalia Fontaine	"Say Yeah"	Remixed Recording
(United States) Bia (Netherlands) R3hab	"Can't Touch This (R3HAB Remix)"	Remixed Recording
(Scotland) Craig Armstrong	"Escape"	Remixed Recording

Nationality	Model	Wings	Runway Shows	Status
(Italy) Italian	Vittoria Ceretti	꒰১ ໒꒱	2024 • 2026	
(Netherlands) Dutch	Felice Nova		2026	
(China) Chinese	Ming Xi	꒰১ ໒꒱	2013–2018 • 2026	Former VS C Angel (2018–2019)
(Brazil) Brazilian	Caroline Trentini		2005–2006 • 2009 • 2026	
(United States) American	Alex Consani	꒰১ ໒꒱	2024–present	
(United States) American	Ashley Graham		2024–present	
(United States) American	Abby Champion	꒰১ ໒꒱	2025–present	
(United States) American	Yumi Nu		2025–present	
(United States) American	Grace Elizabeth		2016–2018 • 2024–present	Former VS 5 Angel (2019–2021)
(China) Chinese	Liu Wen	꒰১ ໒꒱	2009–2012 • 2016–2018 • 2024–present	
(Sweden) Swedish	Elsa Hosk	꒰১ ໒꒱	2011–2018 • 2026	Former VS 5 Angel (2015–2020)
(United States) American (United States) American (Dominican Republic) Dominican (Brazil) Brazilian (Guadeloupe) Guadeloupean (Sri Lanka) Sri Lankan (United States) American (Australia) Australian (United States) American	Devyn Garcia; Tatyana Tinsley; Andreína Martínez; Gizele Oliveira; Tara Falla; Elina Gunawardena; Luna Yohannan; Ayen Agany; Bam Leasure		2024–present 2026; 2026; 2017–2018 • 2026; 2026; 2026; 2026; 2026; 2026	"Angels Among Us" Runner–ups
(Cameroon) Cameroonian	Solange Omon	꒰১ ໒꒱	2026	"Angels Among Us" Winner

=== Segment 6: Winter Reprise ===
Performer	Song	Status
(Wales) (Greece) Marina	"Key to the Castle"	Remixed Recording
(Australia) James Mac (France) Vall	"Try Again"	Remixed Recording
(Slovakia) Adéla	"Nicole Kidman"	Remixed Recording
(United States) Megan Thee Stallion	"Her"	Live Performance
(United States) Megan Thee Stallion	"Body"	Live Performance

Nationality	Model	Wings	Runway Shows	Status
(United Kingdom) British	Rosie Huntington–Whiteley	꒰১ ໒꒱	2006–2010 • 2026	Former VS 4 Angel (2010–2011)
(China) Chinese	He Cong		2024 • 2026	
(South Sudan) South Sudanese	Abény Nhial		2025–present	
(France) Réunionese	Emeline Hoareau		2025–present	
(Georgia (country)) Georgian	Mathilda Gvarliani		2024–present	
(Brazil) Brazilian (Italy) Italian (India) Indian	Luíza Perote; Malika El Maslouhi; Ravleen Varghese		2026	
(Netherlands) Dutch	Rosalieke Fuchs		2026	
(France) French	Cindy Bruna	꒰১ ໒꒱	2013–2018 • 2026	
(Brazil) Brazilian	Daiane Sodre	꒰১ ໒꒱	2025-present	
(United States) American	Paloma Elsesser		2024–present	
(United States) American	Amelia Gray	꒰১ ໒꒱	2025–present	
(Netherlands) Dutch	Yasmin Wijnaldum		2018 • 2025–present	
(United States) American	Precious Lee	꒰১ ໒꒱	2025–present	
(Canada) Canadian	Awar Odhiang		2024–present	
(Russia) Russian	Irina Shayk	꒰১ ໒꒱	2016 • 2024–present	

=== Segment 7: Winter Melody ===
Performer	Song	Status
(United Kingdom) JADE	"Angel of My Dreams"	Remixed Recording
(Greece) Argy (Sweden) Son of Son	"Faust"	Remixed Recording
(Sweden) Zara Larsson (South Africa) Tyla	"Hot & Sexy"	Remixed Recording
(United Kingdom) Rose Gray (United Kingdom) JADE	"Angel of Satisfaction"	Remixed Recording
(Belgium) Wim Mertens	"Often a Bird"	Remixed Recording

Nationality	Model	Wings	Runway Shows	Status	Fantasy Bra	Value
(United States) American	Kylie Jenner	꒰১ ໒꒱	2026		Very Sexy Shine Fantasy Bra by Jacob & Co	$50,000,000
(Netherlands) Dutch	Imaan Hammam		2014 • 2024–present			
(Italy) Italian	Vittoria Ceretti		2024 • 2026			
(Namibia) Namibian	Behati Prinsloo		2007–2015 • 2018 • 2024–present	Former VS 3 Angel (2009–2019)		
(Puerto Rico) Puerto Rican	Joan Smalls		2011–2016 • 2024–present			
(Netherlands) Dutch	Doutzen Kroes		2005–2006 • 2008–2009 • 2011–2014 • 2024–present	Former VS 3 Angel (2008–2014)		
(United States) American	Jasmine Tookes		2012–2018 • 2024–present	Former VS 5 Angel (2015–2021)		
(United States) American	Gigi Hadid	꒰১ ໒꒱	2015–2016 • 2018 • 2024–present			
(Hungary) Hungarian	Barbara Palvin	꒰১ ໒꒱	2012 • 2018 • 2024–present	Former VS 5 Angel (2019–2021)		
(China) Chinese	Liu Wen		2009–2012 • 2016–2018 • 2025–present			
(United Kingdom) British	Rosie Huntington-Whiteley		2006–2010 • 2026	Former VS 4 Angel (2010–2011)		
(United States) American	Bella Hadid	꒰১ ໒꒱	2016–2018 • 2024–present			
(Brazil) Brazilian	Alessandra Ambrosio	꒰১ ໒꒱	2000–2003 • 2005–2017 • 2024–present	Former VS 2 Angel (2004–2017)		
(South Sudan) South Sudanese	Anok Yai	꒰১ ໒꒱	2024–present			
(South Africa) South African	Candice Swanepoel	꒰১ ໒꒱	2007–2015 • 2017–2018 • 2024–present	Former VS 4 Angel (2010–2021)		
(Brazil) Brazilian	Adriana Lima	꒰১ ໒꒱	1999–2003 • 2005–2008 • 2010–18; 2024–present	Former VS 2 Angel (2000–2018)		

== Finale ==
Performer	Song	Status
(United Kingdom) Spice Girls	"Say You'll Be There"	Remixed recording

== Index ==
Symbol	Meaning
VS 2	2nd Generation Angels
VS 3	3rd Generation Angels
VS 4	4th Generation Angels
VS 5	5th Generation Angels
VS C	Chinese Angels
꒰১ ໒꒱	Wings
