= Victoria's Secret Fashion Show 2025 =

Annual fashion show of an US brand

- Status: Active
- Genre: Fashion show
- Date: October 15, 2025
- Frequency: Annually
- Venue: Steiner Studios
- Locations: New York City, United States
- Years active: 1995–2003, 2005–2018, 2024–present
- Inaugurated: August 1, 1995
- Most recent: 2026
- Previous event: 2024
- Next event: 2026
- Member: Victoria's Secret
- Website: Victoria's Secret Fashion Show

The Victoria's Secret Fashion Show is an annual fashion show sponsored by Victoria's Secret, an American brand of lingerie and sleepwear. Victoria's Secret uses the show to promote and market its goods in high-profile settings. The show featured former Victoria's Secret Angels Adriana Lima, Alessandra Ambrosio, Behati Prinsloo, Candice Swanepoel, Doutzen Kroes, Lily Aldridge, Jasmine Tookes, Stella Maxwell, Barbara Palvin, and Grace Elizabeth; veteran Victoria's Secret models Liu Wen, Joan Smalls, Imaan Hammam, Gigi Hadid, Bella Hadid, Irina Shayk, and Yasmin Wijnaldum; leading fashion models Anok Yai, Alex Consani, Ashley Graham, Paloma Elsesser, and Devyn Garcia; and newcomers Emily Ratajkowski, Amelia Gray, Abby Champion, Precious Lee, and Yumi Nu.

On July 29, 2025, Victoria's Secret revealed in an Instagram reel that the Victoria's Secret Fashion Show, which made its comeback in 2024, will continue with another edition this year.

The 2025 Victoria's Secret Fashion Show was livestreamed from New York City at Steiner Studios, on October 15. The show featured musical performances by Missy Elliott, Karol G, K-Pop group Twice, and Madison Beer.

Dates	Locations	Broadcaster	Viewers (millions)	Performers
October 15, 2025 (aired)	New York City	Amazon Live	2.51	Madison Beer, Twice, Karol G and Missy Elliott.

== Fashion show segments ==
=== Segment 1: First Light ===
Performer	Song	Status
(Republic of Ireland) Gavin Friday	"Angel"	Remixed recording
(United States) Donna Summer	"I Feel Love"	Remixed recording

Nationality	Model	Wings	Runway Shows	Status
(United States) American	Jasmine Tookes	꒰১ ໒꒱	2012–2018 • 2024–present	Former VS 5 Angel (2015–2021)
(Brazil) Brazilian	Adriana Lima	꒰১ ໒꒱	1999–2003 • 2005–2008 • 2010–2018 • 2024–present	Former VS 2 Angel (2000–2018)
(Netherlands) Dutch	Doutzen Kroes	꒰১ ໒꒱	2005–2006 • 2008–2009 • 2011–2014 • 2024–present	Former VS 3 Angel (2008–2014)
(Brazil) Brazilian	Alessandra Ambrosio	꒰১ ໒꒱	2000–2003 • 2005–2017 • 2024–present	Former VS 2 Angel (2004–2017)
(United States) American	Lily Aldridge		2009–2017 • 2025	Former VS 4 Angel (2010–2018)
(Puerto Rico) Puerto Rican	Joan Smalls	꒰১ ໒꒱	2011–2016 • 2024–present	
(Hungary) Hungarian	Barbara Palvin	꒰১ ໒꒱	2012 • 2018 • 2024–present	Former VS 5 Angel (2019–2021)
(Namibia) Namibian	Behati Prinsloo		2007–2015 • 2018 • 2024–present	Former VS 3 Angel (2009–2019)
(South Africa) South African	Candice Swanepoel	꒰১ ໒꒱	2007–2015 • 2017–2018 • 2024–present	Former VS 4 Angel (2010–2021)

=== Segment 2: Bombshell ===
Performer	Song	Status
(United States) Madison Beer	"Make You Mine"	Live performance
(United States) Madison Beer	"Bittersweet"	Live performance
(United States) Madison Beer	"Yes Baby"	Live performance

Nationality	Model	Wings	Runway Shows	Status
(United States) American	Gigi Hadid		2015–2016 • 2018 • 2024–present	
(South Sudan) South Sudanese	Abény Nhial		2025–present	
(Australia) Australian	Angelina Kendall	꒰১ ໒꒱	2025	
(United States) American	Grace Elizabeth		2016–2018 • 2024–present	Former VS 5 Angel (2019–2021)
(Russia) Russian	Irina Shayk		2016 • 2024–present	
(Georgia (country)) Georgian	Mathilda Gvarliani		2024–present	
(United States) American	Devyn Garcia	꒰১ ໒꒱	2024–present	
(Canada) Canadian	Awar Odhiang		2024–present	
(United Kingdom) British	Paloma Elsesser	꒰১ ໒꒱	2024–present	
(United States) American	Angel Reese		2025	
(France) French	Emeline Hoareau		2025–present	
(United States) Americans	Abby Champion	꒰১ ໒꒱	2025–present	
(United States) Americans	Precious Lee		2025–present	
(Netherlands) Dutch	Imaan Hammam	꒰১ ໒꒱	2014 • 2024–present	
(South Sudan) South Sudanese	Anok Yai	꒰১ ໒꒱	2024–present	

=== Segment 3: PINK Halftime Show ===
Performer	Song	Status
(South Korea) Twice	"This is For"	Live performance
(South Korea) Twice	"Strategy"	Live performance

Nationality	Model	Wings	Runway Shows	Status
(Brazil) Brazilian (Israel) Israeli	Gabrielle Moura; Daniella Halfon		2025–present 2025	
(United States) American	Sunisa Lee	꒰১ ໒꒱	2025	
(United States) American	Luna Yohannan; Summer Dirx		2025–present	
(United States) American	Quenlin Blackwell	꒰১ ໒꒱	2025–present	
(Colombia) Colombian (Dominican Republic) Dominican	Valentina Castro; Marina Moioli	꒰১ ໒꒱	2025	
(United Kingdom) British	Lila Moss		2024–2025	
(Ethiopia) Ethiopian (South Korea) South Korean	Mekdalawit Mequanent; Yoon Young Bae		2025	
(United Kingdom) British	Iris Law		2025–present	
(United States) American (United Kingdom) British	Ashlyn Erickson; Josey Muckosky		2025	
(United States) American	Barbie Ferreira	꒰১ ໒꒱	2025	

=== Segment 4: Hot Pursuit ===
Performer	Song	Status
(Colombia) Karol G	"Ivonny Bonita"	Live performance
(Colombia) Karol G	"Latina Foreva"	Live performance

Nationality	Model	Wings	Runway Shows	Status
(United States) American	Bella Hadid		2016–2018 • 2024–present	
(United States) American	Alex Consani	꒰১ ໒꒱	2024–present	
(United States) American	Amelia Gray		2025–present	
(Belgium) Belgian	Stella Maxwell	꒰১ ໒꒱	2014–2018 • 2025	Former VS 5 Angel (2015–2021)
(Netherlands) Dutch	Yasmin Wijnaldum		2018 • 2025–present	
(China) Chinese	Liu Wen	꒰১ ໒꒱	2009–2012 • 2016–2018 • 2024–present	
(Brazil) Brazilian	Daiane Sodre		2025–present	
(South Sudan) South Sudanese	Adut Akech		2025	
(United States) American	Yumi Nu	꒰১ ໒꒱	2025–present	
(Russia) Russian	Irina Shayk		2016 • 2024–present	
(United States) American	Grace Elizabeth	꒰১ ໒꒱	2016–2018 • 2024–present	Former VS 5 Angel (2019–2021)
(Puerto Rico) Puerto Rican	Joan Smalls	꒰১ ໒꒱	2011–2016 • 2024–present	

=== Segment 5: Magic Hour ===
Performer	Song	Status
(India) Lata Mangeshkar (India) S. P. Balasubrahmanyam	"Tere Mere Beech Mein"	Remixed recording
(United States) Britney Spears	"Toxic"	Remixed recording
(United States) Amerie	"1 Thing"	Remixed recording
(United States) Lumidee	"Never Leave You (Uh Oooh, Uh Oooh)"	Remixed recording
(Republic of Ireland) Gavin Friday	"Angel"	Remixed recording

Nationality	Model	Wings	Runway Shows	Status
(Australia) Australian	Angelina Kendall	꒰১ ໒꒱	2025	
(United States) American	Abby Champion		2025–present	
(Angola) Angolan	Blesnya Minher		2024–2025	
(China) Chinese	Xiao Wen Ju		2016–2017 • 2025	
(United States) American	Devyn Garcia		2024–present	
(Namibia) Namibian	Behati Prinsloo	꒰১ ໒꒱	2007–2015 • 2018 • 2024–present	Former VS 3 Angel (2009–2019)
(United Kingdom) British	Neelam Gill		2024–present	
(United States) American	Sherry Shi		2025	
(United Kingdom) British	Emily Ratajkowski	꒰১ ໒꒱	2025	
(Georgia (country)) Georgian	Mathilda Gvarliani		2024–present	
(Canada) Canadian	Awar Odhiang	꒰১ ໒꒱	2024–present	
(United States) American	Angel Reese	꒰১ ໒꒱	2025	

=== Segment 6: Black Tie ===
Performer	Song	Status
(Republic of Ireland) Gavin Friday	"Angel"	Remixed recording
(United Kingdom) Jade	"Fantasy"	Remixed recording
(United States) Doja Cat (United States) SZA	"Take Me Dancing"	Remixed recording
(Thailand) Lisa (Spain) Rosalía	"New Woman"	Remixed recording
(Canada) Tate McRae	"Sports Car"	Remixed recording

Nationality	Model	Wings	Runway Shows	Status
(South Africa) South African	Candice Swanepoel		2007–2015 • 2017–2018 • 2024–present	Former VS 4 Angel (2010–2021)
(South Sudan) South Sudanese	Anok Yai		2024–present	
(Netherlands) Dutch	Imaan Hammam	꒰১ ໒꒱	2014 • 2024–present	
(Netherlands) Dutch	Doutzen Kroes		2005–2006 • 2008–2009 • 2011–2014 • 2024–present	Former VS 3 Angel (2008–2014)
(United States) American	Ashley Graham	꒰১ ໒꒱	2024–present	
(United Kingdom) British	Paloma Elsesser		2024–present	
(United States) American	Amelia Gray		2025–present	
(Senegal) Senegalese	Maty Fall Diba		2024–2025	
(Brazil) Brazilian	Daiane Sodre		2025–present	
(Netherlands) Dutch	Yasmin Wijnaldum		2018 • 2025–present	
(South Sudan) South Sudanese	Abény Nhial		2025–present	
(United States) Americans	Gigi Hadid	꒰১ ໒꒱	2015–2016 • 2018 • 2024–present	
(United States) Americans	Alex Consani		2024–present	
(Hungary) Hungarian	Barbara Palvin	꒰১ ໒꒱	2012 • 2018 • 2024–present	Former VS 5 Angel (2019–2021)
(China) Chinese	Liu Wen		2009–2012 • 2016–2018 • 2024–present	
(United States) American	Lily Aldridge	꒰১ ໒꒱	2009–2017 • 2025	Former VS 4 Angel (2010–2018)
(Brazil) Brazilians	Alessandra Ambrosio	꒰১ ໒꒱	2000–2003 • 2005–2017 • 2024–present	Former VS 2 Angel (2004–2017)
(Brazil) Brazilians	Adriana Lima	꒰১ ໒꒱	1999–2003 • 2005–2008 • 2010–2018 • 2024–present	Former VS 2 Angel (2000–2018)
(United States) American	Bella Hadid	꒰১ ໒꒱	2016–2018 • 2024–present	

== Index ==
Symbol	Meaning
VS 2	2nd Generation Angels
VS 3	3rd Generation Angels
VS 4	4th Generation Angels
VS 5	5th Generation Angels
꒰১ ໒꒱	Wings
