= Victoria's Secret Fashion Show 2024 =

Annual fashion show of an US brand

- Status: Active
- Genre: Fashion show
- Date: October 15, 2024
- Frequency: Annually
- Venue: Duggal Greenhouse
- Locations: New York City, United States
- Years active: 1995–2003, 2005–2018, 2024–present
- Inaugurated: August 1, 1995
- Most recent: 2026
- Previous event: 2018
- Next event: 2025
- Member: Victoria's Secret
- Website: Victoria's Secret Fashion Show

The Victoria's Secret Fashion Show is annual fashion show sponsored by Victoria's Secret, an American brand of lingerie and sleepwear. Victoria's Secret uses the show to promote and market its goods in high-profile settings. The show featured former Victoria's Secret Angels Tyra Banks, Adriana Lima, Alessandra Ambrosio, Behati Prinsloo, Candice Swanepoel, Doutzen Kroes, Jasmine Tookes, Josephine Skriver, Taylor Hill, Barbara Palvin, Grace Elizabeth; veteran or former Victoria's Secret models Eva Herzigová, Isabeli Fontana, Liu Wen, Joan Smalls, Imaan Hammam, sisters Gigi & Bella Hadid, Irina Shayk, Mayowa Nicholas; and leading fashion models Kate Moss, Carla Bruni, Anok Yai, Alex Consani, Ashley Graham, Paloma Elsesser, Devyn Garcia, Vittoria Ceretti, Rianne Van Rompaey & Lila Moss.

In 2018, Ed Razek, then chief marketing officer of L Brands (the parent company of Victoria's Secret), gave an interview to Vogue magazine, in which he made controversial statements about the brand's image. Razek revealed that Victoria's Secret promoted a highly limited and stereotyped standard of beauty, focused on slim, white women. He admitted that there was a meticulous selection of Black models and that there were internal conflicts over attempts to include plus-size and transgender women in the shows. The negative response to this interview led to the brand losing major supporters and its market relevance that same year.

In 2023, Victoria's Secret aimed to reshape its image by releasing a documentary The Tour '23, adocumentary-style reimagining of the Victoria's Secret Fashion Show that highlighted its renewed commitment to inclusion and diversity. Now, in 2024, the show's return was promoted as an opportunity for Victoria's Secret to showcase its efforts to diversify its image.

The 2024 Victoria's Secret Fashion Show was livestreamed from New York City on October 15. The show featured musical performances by Cher, Tyla, Lisa, and Joan Jett.

Dates	Locations	Broadcaster	Viewers (millions)	Performers
October 15, 2024 (aired)	New York City	Amazon Live	2.67	Cher, Tyla, Lisa, and Joan Jett

== Fashion show segments ==
Performer	Song	Status
(Thailand) Lisa	"Rockstar"	Live performance

=== Segment 1: Modern Heritage ===
Performer	Song	Status
(United Kingdom) Paloma Faith	"Never Tear Us Apart"	Remixed recording
(United States) Chappell Roan	"Femininomenon"	Remixed recording
(United Kingdom) Charli XCX	"360"	Remixed recording
(United States) Chappell Roan	"Super Graphic Ultra Modern Girl"	Remixed recording

Nationality	Model	Wings	Runway Shows	Status
(United States) American	Gigi Hadid	꒰১ ໒꒱	2015–2016 • 2018 • 2024–present	
(Netherlands) Dutch	Imaan Hammam		2014 • 2024–present	
(United States) American	Grace Elizabeth	꒰১ ໒꒱	2016–2018 • 2024–present	Former VS 5 Angel (2019–2021)
(Netherlands) Dutch	Doutzen Kroes	꒰১ ໒꒱	2005–2006 • 2008–2009 • 2011–2014 • 2024–present	Former VS 3 Angel (2008–2014)
(United States) American	Devyn Garcia	꒰১ ໒꒱	2024–present	
(China) Chinese	Liu Wen	꒰১ ໒꒱	2009–2012 • 2016–2018 • 2024–present	
(Angola) Angolan	Blesnya Minher		2024–2025	
(United States) American	Taylor Hill	꒰১ ໒꒱	2014–2018 • 2024	Former VS 5 Angel (2015–2020)
(United Kingdom) British	Paloma Elsesser	꒰১ ໒꒱	2024–present	
(Canada) Canadian	Awar Odhiang		2024–present	
(South Sudan) South Sudanese	Anok Yai	꒰১ ໒꒱	2024–present	
(Brazil) Brazilian	Adriana Lima	꒰১ ໒꒱	1999–2003 • 2005–2008 • 2010–2018 • 2024–present	Former VS 2 Angel (2000–2018)

=== Segment 2: Twinkle ===
Performer(s)	Song	Status
(South Africa) Tyla	"Push 2 Start"	Live performance
(South Africa) Tyla	"Water"	Live performance

Nationality	Model	Wings	Runway Shows	Status
(South Africa) South African	Candice Swanepoel	꒰১ ໒꒱	2007–2015 • 2017–2018 • 2024–present	Former VS 4 Angel (2010–2021)
(Romania) Romanian	Andreea Diaconu	꒰১ ໒꒱	2024	
(United Kingdom) British	Lila Moss	꒰১ ໒꒱	2024–2025	
(Senegal) Senegalese	Maty Fall Diba	꒰১ ໒꒱	2024–2025	
(France) French	Mika Schneider		2024	
(Hungary) Hungarian	Barbara Palvin	꒰১ ໒꒱	2012 • 2018 • 2024–present	Former VS 5 Angel (2019–2021)
(United States) American	Alex Consani	꒰১ ໒꒱	2024–present	
(Denmark) Danish	Josephine Skriver		2013–2018 • 2024	Former VS 5 Angel (2016–2021)
(United Kingdom) British	Neelam Gill		2024–present	
(United States) American	Jasmine Tookes	꒰১ ໒꒱	2012–2018 • 2024–present	Former VS 5 Angel (2015–2021)
(Greece) Greek	Anthi Fakidari		2024	
(Russia) Russian	Victoria Evseeva	꒰১ ໒꒱	2024	
(France) French	Jessie Aina		2024	
(Italy) Italian	Vittoria Ceretti	꒰১ ໒꒱	2024 • 2026	

=== Segment 3: Heroes ===
Performer	Song	Status
(Australia) Orianthi	"I Love Rock 'n Roll"	Live performance
(Australia) Orianthi	"Are You Gonna Go My Way"	Live performance

Nationality	Model	Wings	Runway Shows	Status
(United Kingdom) British	Kate Moss	꒰১ ໒꒱	2024	
(Netherlands) Dutch	Rianne Van Rompaey	꒰১ ໒꒱	2024	
(Brazil) Brazilian (Georgia (country)) Georgian	Paula Soares; Mathilda Gvarliani		2024; 2024–present	
(Nigeria) Nigerian (United States) American	Mayowa Nicholas; Kai Soleil	꒰১ ໒꒱	2018 • 2024; 2024	
(United Kingdom) British (China) Chinese	Layla Etengan; Xu Wei	꒰১ ໒꒱	2024	
(Brazil) Brazilian	Valentina Sampaio	꒰১ ໒꒱	2024	
(Namibia) Namibian	Behati Prinsloo	꒰১ ໒꒱	2007–2015 • 2018 • 2024–present	Former VS 3 Angel (2009–2019)
(Russia) Russian	Irina Shayk		2016 • 2024–present	
(Puerto Rico) Puerto Rican	Joan Smalls	꒰১ ໒꒱	2011–2016 • 2024–present	

=== Segment 4: Atelier ===
Performer	Song	Status
(Thailand) Lisa	"Moonlit Floor"	Live performance

Nationality	Model	Wings	Runway shows	Status
(United States) Americans	Ashley Graham	꒰১ ໒꒱	2024–present	
(United States) Americans	Devyn Garcia	꒰১ ໒꒱	2024–present	
(Netherlands) Dutch	Jill Kortleve		2024	
(Brazil) Brazilian	Alessandra Ambrosio	꒰১ ໒꒱	2000–2003 • 2005–2017 • 2024–present	Former VS 2 Angel (2004–2017)
(Morocco) Moroccan	Rania Benchegra		2024	
(South Sudan) South Sudanese	Alaato Jazyper	꒰১ ໒꒱	2024	
(China) Chinese	He Cong		2024 • 2026	
(Brazil) Brazilian	Isabeli Fontana		2003 • 2005 • 2007–2010 • 2012 • 2014 • 2024	
(Switzerland) Swiss	Vivienne Rohner	꒰১ ໒꒱	2024	
(Czech Republic) Czech	Eva Herzigová		1999–2001 • 2024	
(Italy) Italian	Carla Bruni	꒰১ ໒꒱	2024	

=== Segment 5: Unwrap The Magic ===
Performer(s)	Song	Status
(United States) Cher	"Strong Enough"	Live performance
(United States) Cher	"Believe"	Live performance

Nationality	Model	Wings	Runway Shows	Status
(Italy) Italian	Vittoria Ceretti	꒰১ ໒꒱	2024 • 2026	
(Netherlands) Dutch	Imaan Hammam	꒰১ ໒꒱	2014 • 2024–present	
(United Kingdom) British	Paloma Elsesser		2024–present	
(United States) American	Grace Elizabeth	꒰১ ໒꒱	2016–2018 • 2024–present	Former VS 5 Angel (2019–2021)
(South Sudan) South Sudanese	Anok Yai	꒰১ ໒꒱	2024–present	
(South Africa) South African	Candice Swanepoel	꒰১ ໒꒱	2007–2015 • 2017–2018 • 2024–present	Former VS 4 Angel (2010–2021)
(United Kingdom) British	Mia Armstrong	꒰১ ໒꒱	2024	
(United States) American	Gigi Hadid		2015–2016 • 2018 • 2024–present	
(Brazil) Brazilian	Adriana Lima	꒰১ ໒꒱	1999–2003 • 2005–2008 • 2010–2018 • 2024–present	Former VS 2 Angel (2000–2018)
(Netherlands) Dutch	Rianne Van Rompaey	꒰১ ໒꒱	2024	
(United States) American	Bella Hadid		2016–2018 • 2024–present	

== Finale ==
Tyra Banks led the finale.

Performer	Song	Status
(United States) Odyssey	"Native New Yorker"	Recording

Nationality	Model	Runway Shows	Status
(United States) American	Tyra Banks	1996–2003 • 2005 • 2024	Former VS 1 Angel (1997–2005)

== Index ==
Symbol	Meaning
VS 1	1st Generation Angels
VS 2	2nd Generation Angels
VS 3	3rd Generation Angels
VS 4	4th Generation Angels
VS 5	5th Generation Angels
꒰১ ໒꒱	Wings
