= Jill Kortleve =

Dutch model (born 1993)

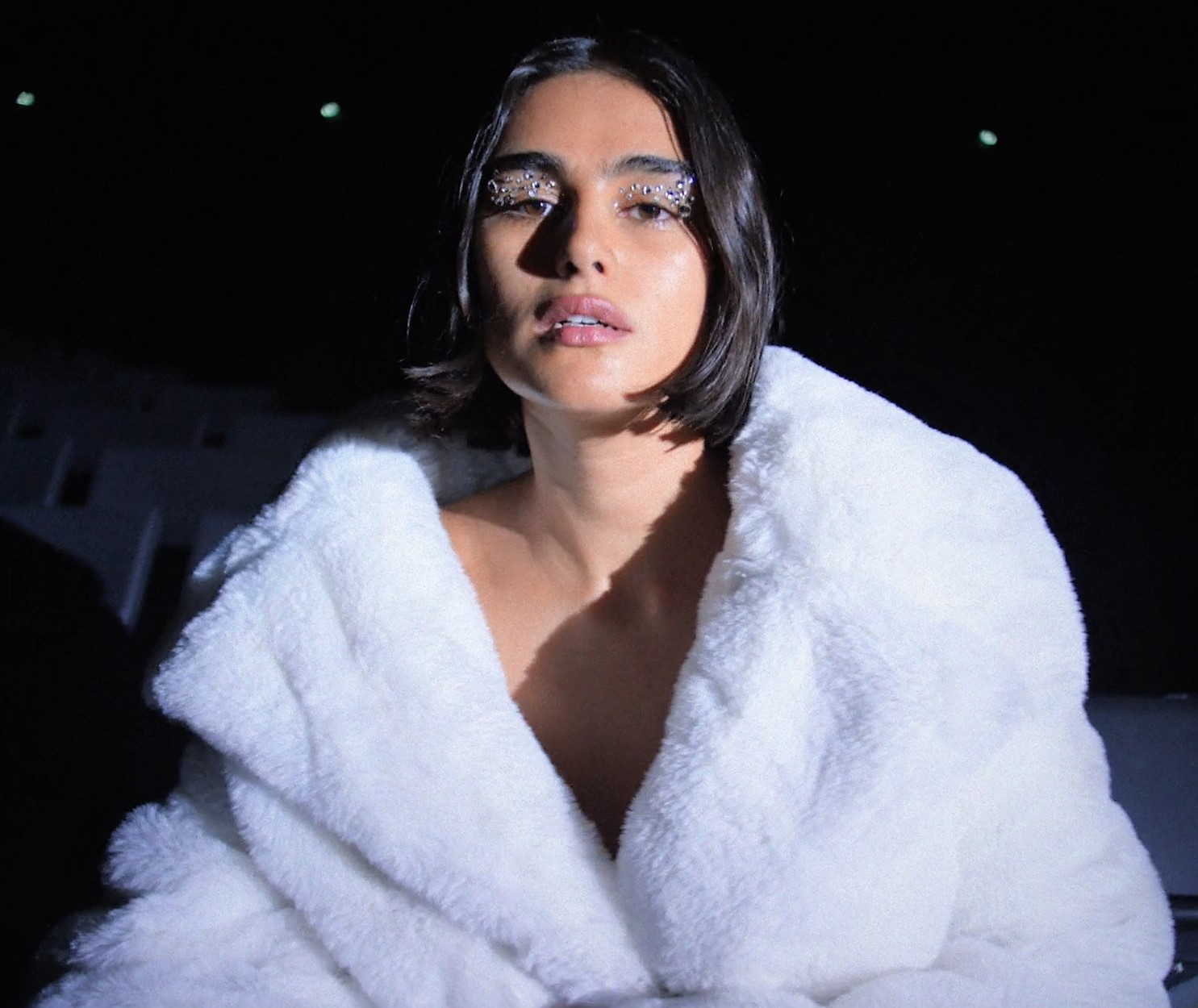
- Kortleve modeling Coperni in 2021
- Born: Jill Megan Kortleve; November 5, 1993 (age 32); Heerlen, Netherlands
- Modeling information
- Height: 5 ft 8 in (1.73 m)
- Hair color: Black
- Eye color: Brown
- Agency: IMG Models (New York); Women Management (Paris); Milk Management (London); The Movement Models (Amsterdam) (mother agency)

Jill Megan Kortleve (born November 5, 1993) is a Dutch model. She made her runway debut as an exclusive for Alexander McQueen's Spring/Summer 2019 show, and in 2020 she became the first plus-size model to walk a Chanel runway show in a decade. She has appeared on the covers of multiple international editions of Vogue.

== Early life ==
Kortleve was born in Heerlen, a town in the southeast of the Netherlands, and is of Dutch, Surinamese, Indonesian, and Indian descent. Her first job was as a supermarket cashier. She moved to Amsterdam at eighteen, where she tried to work as a "straight size" model and dieted constantly; she eventually walked away, traveled to Bali, and had "SELF LOVE" tattooed on her hands before returning to modeling at a healthier weight. She was discovered by her best friend, who founded the Amsterdam agency The Movement Models and signed her as its first model; her first modeling job was for Nike, and she has named a Diesel commercial as an early favorite.

== Career ==
Kortleve returned to modeling in September 2018, when she was booked, a virtual unknown, for Alexander McQueen's Spring/Summer 2019 show. In February 2020, she walked her first Milan Fashion Week show for Fendi's Fall/Winter 2020 collection; she and Paloma Elsesser were the first plus-size models cast in the house's history. She ended the season at Paris Fashion Week, where she became the first curve model to walk for Chanel since Crystal Renn in 2010. She has also walked for Michael Kors, Jacquemus, Valentino, Mugler, Rag & Bone, Prabal Gurung, Simone Rocha, Kate Spade, and Max Mara.

Kortleve returned to the Chanel runway for the house's Spring/Summer 2021 show, and in July 2022 she appeared as the bride in its Fall/Winter 2022 haute couture show. She signed with IMG Models in 2022, and in January 2023 she was the only midsize model cast in Chanel's haute couture show, as she had been the season before.

That February, The New York Times profiled Kortleve as one of the only midsize models then working in high fashion, and quoted her saying she did not want to be put "under any label or box". Two months later, she appeared with Elsesser and Precious Lee on the cover of the April 2023 issue of British Vogue, which billed the trio as the "New Supers". She was added to the BoF 500, Business of Fashion's index of people shaping the fashion industry, in 2023. In October 2024, she walked in the revived Victoria's Secret Fashion Show in New York.

Kortleve's first Vogue cover was the October 2019 issue of Vogue Nederland. She has since appeared on the covers of Vogue Paris, American Vogue (April 2020), Vogue España (February 2021), Vogue Italia, and Vogue Russia, among other editions.
