= Elina Gunawardena =

Sri Lankan fashion model

- Born: 2006 (age 19–20); Sri Lanka
- Modeling information
- Height: 5 ft 11 in (1.80 m)
- Agency: Ford Models (Paris); Storm Management (London); The Lions (New York)

Elina Gunawardena, known professionally as Elina G, is a Sri Lankan fashion model. She began modelling in Sri Lanka in 2021 and signed with Ford Models in Paris in 2025, going on to walk at Paris Fashion Week and to appear on the cover of Vogue Netherlands. In October 2026 Sri Lankan media reported her as the first Sri Lankan model to walk in the Victoria's Secret Fashion Show.

== Early life and start ==
Gunawardena is from Sri Lanka. She joined Panthera Management in 2021, at the age of 14, after her older sisters joined the agency. Her first major show was Mercedes-Benz Fashion Week Sri Lanka in December 2022, and she went on to walk at Colombo Fashion Week in 2024 and 2025.

== International career ==
Gunawardena interviewed with Ford Models in Paris in February 2025 and signed with the agency the following day. At her first Paris Fashion Week, in February and March 2025, she walked nine shows, including Chanel, Hermès, Rabanne, Dries Van Noten and Moncler, and opened the Isabel Marant show. She is also represented by Storm Management in London and The Lions in New York. She has since walked for houses including Jean Paul Gaultier, Max Mara and Fendi. In May 2026 she appeared on the cover of Vogue Netherlands.

On 18 October 2026 she walked in the Victoria's Secret Fashion Show in Los Angeles. Sri Lankan news outlets described this as making her the first Sri Lankan model to appear in the show.
