= Birgit Kos =

Dutch fashion model

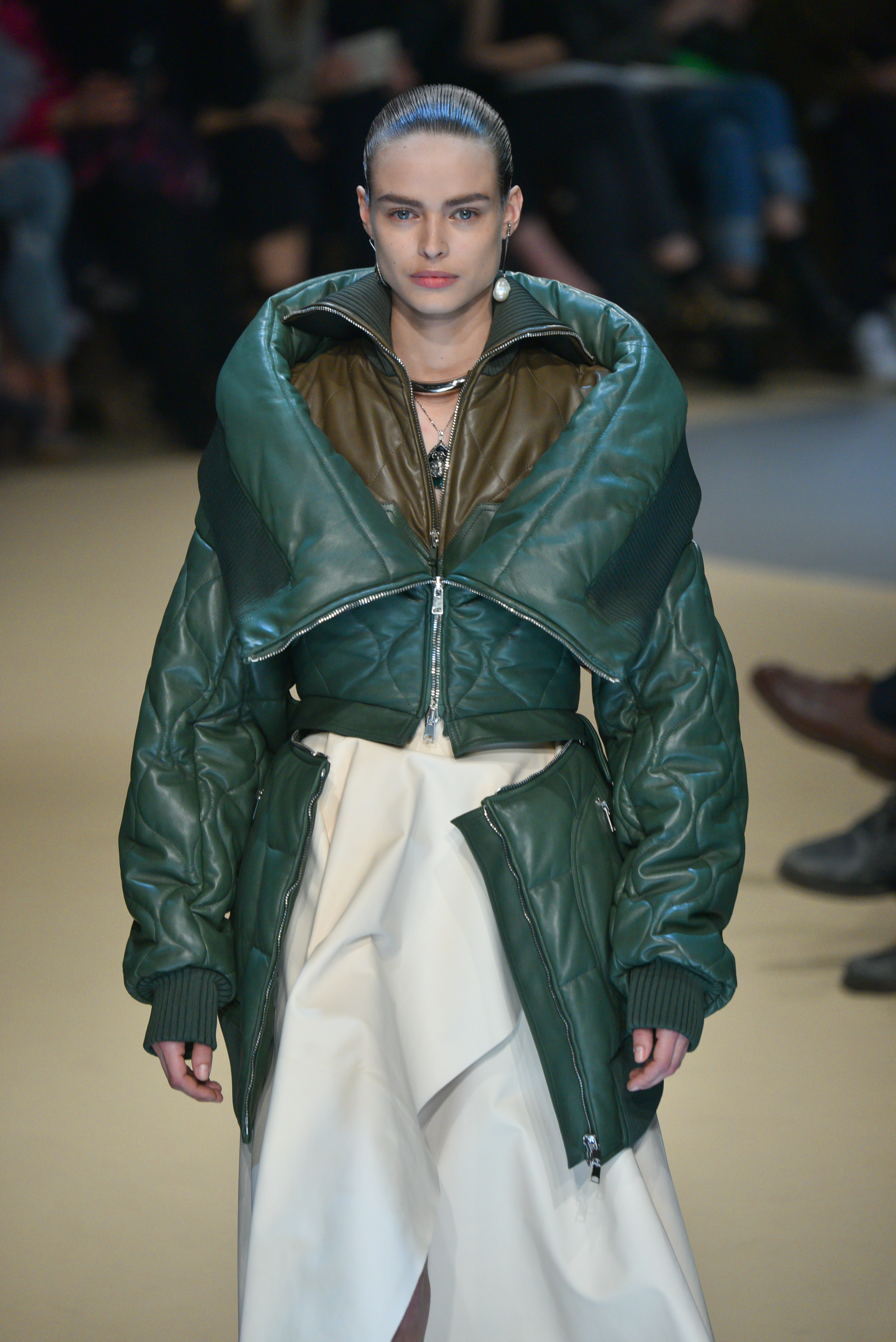
- Kos walking the runway for Alexander McQueen in 2018
- Born: 13 April 1995 (age 31); Dedemsvaart, Netherlands
- Occupation: Model
- Years active: 2010–present
- Modeling information
- Height: 1.80 m (5 ft 11 in)
- Hair color: Light Brown
- Eye color: Blue-Green
- Agency: The Society Management (New York); Elite Model Management (Paris, Milan, London, Amsterdam, Barcelona, Copenhagen); Model Management (Hamburg); Munich Models (Munich)

Birgit Kos (born April 13, 1995) is a Dutch fashion model. She is known for both her work in fashion magazines and at fashion shows.

== Early life ==
Kos is Dutch. Born and raised in Overijssel, Kos now resides in Zürich, Switzerland. She says her creative outlet is being active in nature.

== Career ==
Kos was first scouted while she was 15 in Amsterdam by two local modeling agents. After meeting with a modeling agency in the Netherlands, Kos was told that her "hips were too big" to obtain a contract with them. She entered the 2010 Elite Model Look competition a year later, where she represented the Netherlands during the world finals and won a contract with Elite Model Management in Amsterdam. After the competition, she took a few years off to focus on schooling before modeling full-time. Kos lived in Milan for two years in a model apartment to develop her career.

Kos' first magazine cover was for Glamour France's January 2016 issue. In 2017, Kos worked with notable Peruvian photographer Mario Testino.

Kos has appeared in advertisements for Giorgio Armani, Miu Miu, Gap Inc., Calvin Klein, Lanvin, Tom Ford, and Massimo Dutti. She and Irish actor Jamie Dornan co-starred in a Hugo Boss advertising campaign which included a mini-movie in 2018. Kos said, she would like to do more acting as modeling is not the most secure job.

Kos has been on the covers of Vogue Italia, Vogue Brasil, Vogue Japan, Vogue Germany, Vogue Mexico & Latino America, Vogue Netherlands, Vogue Russia and Vogue España. Kos appeared alongside Croatian model Faretta in the Spring 2019 campaign for Italian label Twinset.

Kos is currently ranked as one of Models.com's "Top 50 Models".

=== Fashion show modeling ===
After signing to Elite Worldwide in 2014, Kos made her show debut in Dolce & Gabbana's Alta Moda Fall 2015 show. In 2016, she exclusively opened Miu Miu's Spring/Summer 2017 show. She went on to close Fendi and Hermès' Fall/Winter 2017 shows and open Chloé's show of the same season. In the Spring/Summer 2018 season, Kos closed Tory Burch. In the Fall/Winter 2018 season, Kos closed Blumarine and opened Roberto Cavalli. In the Spring/Summer 2019 season, Kos closed Hermès and opened Zimmermann.
