= Cato van Ee =

Dutch fashion model (born 1990)

- Born: 1 January 1990 (age 36); South Carolina, U.S.
- Spouse: Sander van der Does (m. 2022)
- Children: 2
- Modeling information
- Hair color: Blonde
- Eye color: Blue
- Agency: IMG Models (New York); VIVA Model Management (Paris, London, Barcelona); Platform Agency (Madrid, Amsterdam) (mother agency)

Cato van Ee is a Dutch-American fashion model.

== Early life ==
Van Ee was born in South Carolina, United States, to Dutch parents and raised in California, United States, until she was eight years old, when the family moved to Bentveld, The Netherlands.

== Career ==
Van Ee entered the Dutch Elite Model Look contest in 2004 and signed with Elite Model Management the same year. Her first magazine cover was in January 2006 for Elle Netherlands, and she appeared in the magazine throughout the year. She made her runway debut as a Prada (and Miu Miu) exclusive in 2008. She moved to New York City for her career, and switched to IMG Models. Soon after, she was photographed by Steven Meisel for a Calvin Klein Jeans ad campaign. In 2009, she was also chosen as an exclusive for Givenchy and participated in Vogue's Fashion's Night Out event. She appeared in an ensemble D&G campaign with models such as Jacquelyn Jablonski and Daria Strokous.

In June 2020, she, Julie Hoomans, and several other models, including Bente Oort and Anna de Rijk appeared on individual, remotely shot covers of Vogue Netherlands during the COVID-19 health crisis

== Personal life ==
Van Ee has a daughter, Eleanor Maeve, born in December 2021. After years of delays due to the COVID-19 pandemic, she married her life partner in 2022. She and her daughter have appeared on the cover of Elle Spain. As of 2023, they have a second daughter.
