= Rianne Van Rompaey =

Dutch fashion model (born 1996)

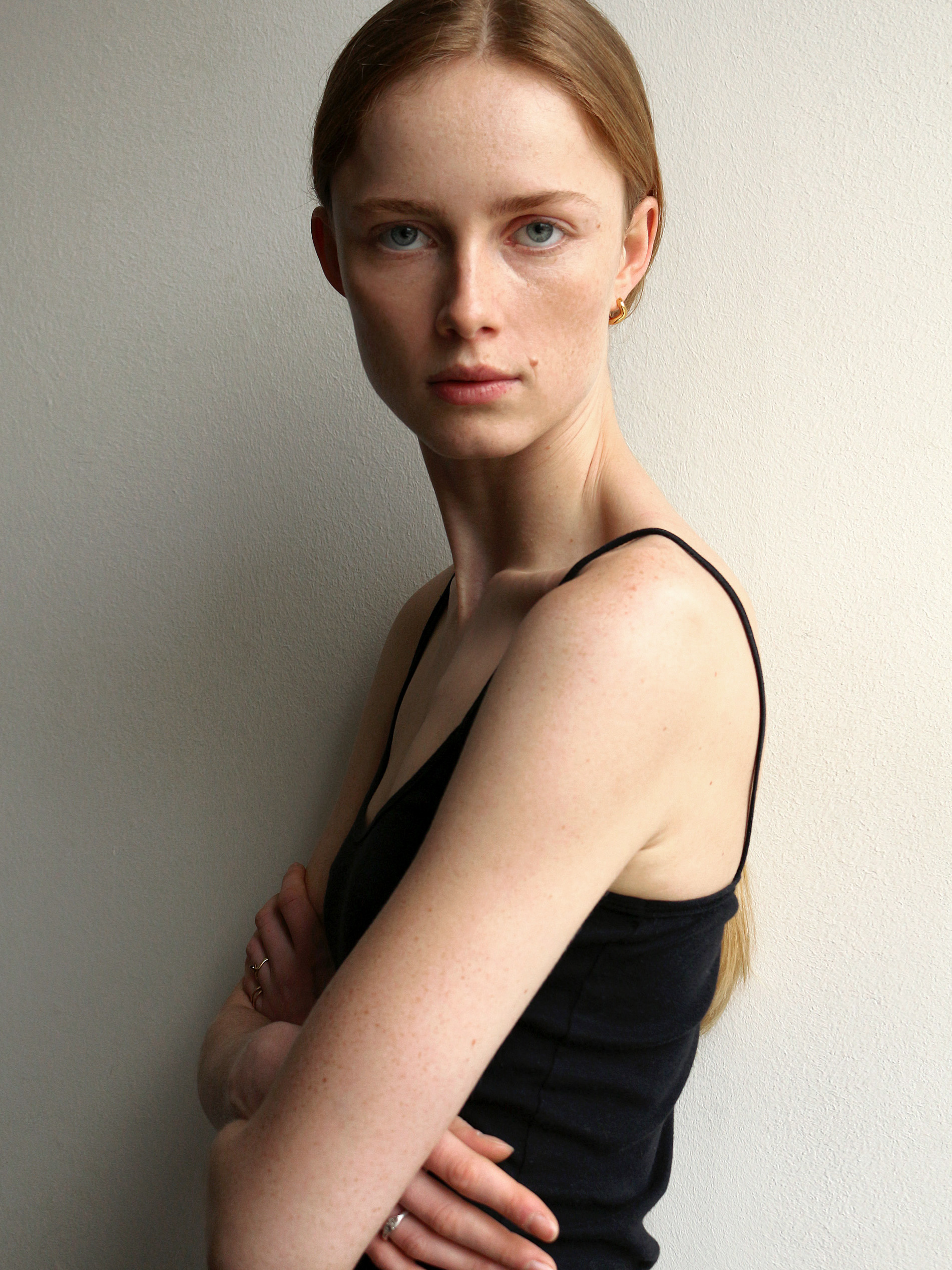
- Van Rompaey in 2023
- Born: Rianne Frida Loes Van Rompaey; 3 January 1996 (age 30); Hoofddorp, North Holland, Netherlands
- Occupation: Fashion model
- Years active: 2010–present
- Modeling information
- Height: 1.79 m (5 ft 10 1/2 in)
- Hair color: Red
- Eye color: Blue
- Agency: DNA Model Management (New York); VIVA Model Management (Paris, London, Barcelona); Paparazzi Model Management (Amsterdam)

Rianne Frida Loes Van Rompaey (Dutch: [riˈjɑnə vɑn rɔmˈpaːi]; born 3 January 1996) is a Dutch fashion model. Labeled as a top model by Vogue, she has appeared on the cover of Vogue Paris over 6 times. She is currently ranked as an "Industry Icon" by models.com.

== Early life ==
Van Rompaey was born on 3 January 1996 in Hoofddorp, North Holland, and raised in Wageningen, Gelderland, to Dutch and Belgian parents. She attended Montessori School there, and obtained a VWO diploma at Pantarijn College. Van Rompaey started her career by sending photographs to Paparazzi Models, and began modeling professionally as a high school student.

== Career ==
Van Rompaey's first photoshoot was for the January 2013 and February 2013 issues of Elle Netherlands.

In 2014, Nicolas Ghesquiere chose Van Rompaey to be a Louis Vuitton exclusive, which included campaigns for the brand including S/S 2016 with actor Jaden Smith. She has done campaigns for Chanel, Alexander McQueen, Valentino, Miu Miu, Chloé, Moschino, Celine, Ports 1961, Michael Kors, Fendi, Alberta Ferretti, Loewe, Sacai, Salvatore Ferragamo, Versace, Marc Jacobs, Isabel Marant, Prada, Coach, Bottega Veneta, Hugo Boss, and Burberry.

Van Rompaey has appeared on the covers of Vogue Italia, Vogue Paris, Vogue China, Vogue Germany, Vogue Japan, Vogue Korea, Vogue Russia, Vogue Netherlands and The New York Times Style Magazine, and Harper's Bazaar.

In 2016, casting director Piergiorgio Del Moro, who placed Van Rompaey in Versace, Victoria Beckham, and Fendi shows, told Vogue magazine that van Rompaey would have a long career because of her personality. Vogue Paris editor-in-chief Emmanuelle Alt corroborated this view.

In September 2019, for the 1000th issue of Vogue Paris, she simultaneously appeared on 4 covers; the same year she had appeared on March and May covers of the magazine. She also appeared on 3 covers for WSJ Magazine that month. In December 2019, she was chosen as runner-up for models.com's "Model of the Year" awards.

Van Rompaey was ranked on Models.com's "Top 50" models list in 2016, calling her "one of the year's biggest breakout stars". In the same year, ELLE UK and Harper's Bazaar UK predicted van Rompaey was on track to becoming a supermodel.

In 2024 she made her acting debut in Faces, a short film by Canadian director David Findlay.

In February 2025, Van Rompaey announced she was taking a break from modelling.

== Filmography ==
=== Film ===
List of film credits
Year	Title	Director	Role	Note
2019	Louis Vuitton: The Spirit of Travel	Angelo Pennetta		Advertising short
2022	Chanel Eyewear: S/S 22			Advertising short
2024	Chanel Autumn-Winter 2024/25 Ready-to-Wear Show - A Cinematic Story	Inez & Vinoodh	Waitress	Advertising short
2024	Faces	David Findlay	Rianne	Short film
2026	Forty Love	Pierre-Ange Carlotti	Simona	

=== Television ===
List of television credits
Year	Title	Role	Note
TBA	De Stilte	Sara Post	
