= Luna Bijl =

Dutch fashion model

- Born: 4 February 1998 (age 28); Netherlands
- Modeling information
- Height: 1.80 m (5 ft 11 in)
- Hair color: Brown
- Eye color: Blue
- Agency: DNA Models (New York); Oui Management (Paris); Monster Management (Milan); Freedom Models (Los Angeles); Premier Model Management (London) (mother agency)

Luna Bijl is a Dutch fashion model. She is known as one of late designer Karl Lagerfeld’s muses.

In December 2024, Models.com added Bijl to their 'Money List', saying that she had "attracted top-tier commercial clients and secured lucrative, long-term endorsement deals."

== Career ==
Bijl debuted at S/S 2016 fashion week. In her "breakout" 2017 season, she walked for designers such as Alexander Wang, Louis Vuitton, and Chanel. In 2016, she was on the cover of Vogue Paris twice making her the first model to appear twice in one year. Bijl has done campaigns for Emporio Armani, Chloé, Mango, Zara, Louis Vuitton, and TOM FORD.

Bijl was nominated for models.com’s "Model of the Year" in 2017.

== Personal life ==
Bijl is currently in relationship with Indonesian football player, Maarten Paes.
