= Mathilda Gvarliani =

Georgian model (born 2004)

- მატილდა გვარლიანი
- Born: 17 May 2004 (age 22); Mestia, Georgia
- Modeling information
- Height: 1.75 m (5 ft 9 in)
- Hair color: Brown
- Eye color: Brown
- Agency: Next Management (worldwide); Viva (Barcelona); Iconic Management (Berlin); Elite Model Management (Copenhagen); Munich Models (Munich); MIKAs (Stockholm)

Mathilda Gvarliani (Georgian: მატილდა გვარლიანი; born 17 May 2004) is a Georgian fashion model. She was the first Georgian model to walk the Victoria's Secret Fashion Show as well as the first Georgian model to appear on a Vogue cover. In 2024, she became the first Georgian model to enter models.com's Top 50 ranking. In 2025, Gvarliani was one of 30 models hired by Swedish clothing store H&M for its "digital twins" campaign, which let the company use their likenesses in AI-generated branding, a decision H&M acknowledged would be controversial. The first advertisements featuring her digital twin were released that July.

== Career ==
Gvarliani first walked into the Tbilisi agency Look Models Management at the age of 12 and was told to come back when she was older; she returned at 14 and was signed on the spot. She began traveling solo for work at 15. She debuted at Louis Vuitton's resort show in San Diego, California. In her first seasons, Gvarliani walked the runway for Chanel, Dior, Isabel Marant, Chloé, Gucci, and Schiaparelli. She appeared on the covers of Vogue Netherlands in December 2022 and March 2024, the first Georgian model to cover Vogue. Her other covers include M Le Magazine du Monde (October 2023) and Self Service (spring/summer 2024).

In January 2024, she starred in Chanel's Chance fragrance campaign, photographed by Steven Meisel, and that April she became the first Georgian model to enter models.com's Top 50 ranking. She appeared in the December 2024 60th anniversary issue of Vogue Italia alongside models including Anok Yai, Alex Consani, and Eva Herzigová. When the Victoria's Secret Fashion Show returned from its hiatus, in 2024, Gvarliani became the first Georgian model to walk in the show in its history; she also walked in the show in 2025. In March 2025, H&M announced plans to create AI-generated "digital twins" of 30 models, Gvarliani among them, for use in its marketing campaigns; the company said the models would keep ownership of their twins and be paid for their use, and acknowledged the decision would be controversial. The first advertisements featuring Gvarliani's twin appeared in July 2025.

She appeared on two covers of Vogue Korea's June 2025 issue, photographed by Luigi & Iango. In December, she won the readers' choice award for Best Street Style (Women+) at models.com's Model of the Year Awards. In 2026, she covered the May issue of Vogue Korea a second time and starred in Isabel Marant's Fall/Winter 2026 campaign, photographed by Drew Vickers.
