= Julia Bergshoeff =

Dutch model (born 1997)

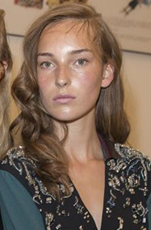
- Bergshoeff in 2016
- Born: 14 August 1997 (age 29); Papendrecht, the Netherlands
- Occupation: Fashion model
- Years active: 2013–present
- Modeling information
- Height: 5 ft 11.5 in (182 cm)
- Hair color: Brown
- Eye color: Green
- Agency: DNA Model Management (New York); VIVA Model Management (Barcelona, London, and Paris); Why Not Model Management (Milan); Ulla Models (Amsterdam)

Julia Bergshoeff (born 14 August 1997) is a Dutch fashion model. Her clients include: Chanel, Dior, Dolce & Gabbana, Calvin Klein, Ralph Lauren, Prada, and Versace. She has also featured in the Spanish version of Harper's Bazaar and various international versions of Vogue.

Models.com has described Bergshoeff as a "laid back beauty."

== Early life ==
Bergshoeff was born in the Dutch town of Papendrecht surrounded by her parents, her grandparents, and her three sisters.

When she was younger, Bergshoeff "never wanted to end up sitting behind a desk in an office building," but "dreamt of seeing the world."

== Career ==
Bergshoeff was scouted aged 15, in the Netherlands, while shopping with friends.

In a November 2019 Telegraph interview, Bergshoeff said the job that launched her career was the 2013 Prada resort show staged in Milan. Expanding, Bergshoeff stated that it happened "very suddenly"—one day she was in school and the next day she walked for Prada. Bergshoeff revealed that it was a "huge shock" for her and for the people around her, but in the "greatest way possible." It was the moment when she realised her life changed forever.

Bergshoeff was featured on the cover of the May 2020 issue of Numéro Russia and in June 2023, she was featured in an exclusive editorial for the Dutch version of Numéro.

Her "low-key" approach and "pristine looks" have seen parallels drawn to Freja Beha Erichsen and Daria Werbowy.

== Mental health ==
Bergshoeff has used her Instagram platform to share her mental health history and experiences, including: anorexia, body dysmorphia, bulimia, depression, and panic attacks.

Furthermore, Bergshoeff has disclosed that she experienced rape and sexual assault aged 5 and 14, leading to the development of PTSD, depression, claustrophobia, eating disorders, and general anxiety.

== Personal life ==
Bergshoeff is in a relationship with entrepreneur Camille Tanoh.
