= Marjan Jonkman =

Dutch model

- Born: Sint Nicolaasga, Netherlands
- Modeling information
- Height: 1.80 m (5 ft 11 in)
- Hair color: Blonde
- Eye color: Blue
- Agency: Two Management (Barcelona) www.twomanagement.com; Two Management (Copenhagen); Two Management (Los Angeles); Two Management (Berlin); Women Management (New York, Paris); MP Management (Milan, Miami, Stockholm); Premier Model Management (London)* Visage Management (Zurich)

Marjan Jonkman is a Dutch fashion model. In February 2018, models.com ranked her as one of the Top 50 models in the world.

== Career ==
Jonkman was scouted on Facebook. She started her career as a Saint Laurent exclusive; she modeled in campaigns for Topshop, Adidas, Marc Jacobs, Lanvin, Sephora, and Dsquared2, among others.

She walked in 60 shows during the A/W 2016 fashion week, including Chanel, Gucci, Dior, Versace, Alexander Wang, Kenzo, Moschino, Fendi, J.W. Anderson and Paul Smith.

== Personal life ==
Jonkman formerly lived in New York City and currently lives in Amsterdam.
