= Imaan Hammam =

Moroccan Dutch fashion model (born 1996)

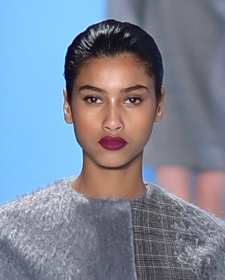
- Hammam in 2015
- Born: 5 October 1996 (age 30); Amsterdam, Netherlands
- Modeling information
- Height: 5 ft 10 1/2 in (1.79 m)
- Hair color: Brown
- Eye color: Brown
- Agency: DNA Models (New York); VIVA Model Management (Paris, London, Barcelona); Why Not Model Management (Milan); CODE Management (Amsterdam)

Imaan Hammam (born 5 October 1996) is an Egyptian Moroccan fashion model. As of March 2026, she has appeared on the cover of Vogue twenty-seven times, four times on the American edition. She currently ranks on models.com's "Industry Icons" and was ranked on its "Top Sexiest Models" lists. As of 2021, she has appeared on The Big Four covers of Vogue. Hammam has received industry recognition through Models.com, where she has been listed under the 'Money' and 'Supers' categories.

== Early life ==
Imaan Hammam was born in Amsterdam, Netherlands, to an Egyptian father from Cairo and a Moroccan mother from Zagora. Her parents were both immigrants; her mother immigrated to the Netherlands at the age of 19. Hammam's father worked in music, and her mother worked as a seamstress and a Dutch language teacher for new immigrants. Hammam has four older half-siblings from her mother side, and one younger full-sibling who is also a Dutch-Egyptian-Moroccan model. Hammam and her family spoke Arabic at home.

When Hammam was 11 years old, her parents divorced. Following the separation, she and her sister Aisha, from her Egyptian father, lived with their mother in the Netherlands along with their four half-siblings. Hammam is a Muslim.

== Career ==
=== 2013–2016: Early work ===
Hammam is signed with DNA Model Management in New York, VIVA Model Management in Paris, London, and Barcelona, Why Not Model Management in Milan, and CODE Management in Amsterdam.

Hammam was first discovered in Amsterdam's Central Station by an agent from CODE Management in 2010 at age 13 and signed her first contract when she was 16 Hammam made her debut walking for Jean Paul Gaultier Couture in 2013. In 2013, her agency sent her to Paris with VIVA Model Management and she was given the special honor to open the Givenchy show as an exclusive. In 2014 Hammam appeared on the cover of the US Vogue, and in 2015 she appeared on the cover of the Teen Vogue and Vogue Netherlands. Hammam's inspirations were Raquel Zimmerman, Liya Kebede and Iman. In April 2016, Hammam won Couturesque Magazine's Model of the Year competition, receiving more than half of the public vote against popular models Lucky Blue Smith and Bella Hadid.

=== 2017–present: Rise to prominence ===
In 2017, Hammam appeared in the cover of the British Vogue, twice in the cover of Vogue Japan, Vogue China, Vogue Espana, Vogue Arabia, Vogue Netherlands, twice on the cover of Vogue US along with the supermodels Liu Wen, Gigi Hadid and Vittoria Ceretti in March and along with Pharell Williams in December. Hammam was chosen as the face of Chanel beauty, the first black-Arab model to do so. The editor of Vogue, Anna Wintour, is a supporter of Hammam and mentioned the model in her editor's letter the first time she appeared in the magazine.

In 2018, Hammam started gaining recognition after her confident walk for Versace F/W 2018 show. In March 2018, Hammam appeared on the cover of Vogue Arabia along with the supermodel Iman. In 2019, Hammam appeared on the cover of Vogue Italia, Vogue Russia, Vogue Japan and Vogue Netherlands. In 2020 Hammam partnered with the brand Frame, releasing a limited edition ready-to-wear collection. In 2021, Hammam appeared on the cover of Forbes ''30 under 30- Europe- Art and Culture and appeared on the cover of Vogue Paris, obtaining the big 4. In 2022 Hammam appeared on the advertising campaign for JPG Scandal perfume.

In 2019, Hammam announced a partnership with nonprofit organization She's the First as the organization's first global ambassador. On 18 November 2021, Hammam was honored by She's the First as the "Powerhouse of the Year" in a virtual awards ceremony, with the award presented by Anna Wintour.

Hammam has appeared in covers and editorials for publications including Elle, Harper's Bazaar, Allure, Glamour, Pop, LOVE, The Gentlewoman, i-D, V, Holiday, Wall Street Journal, Porter, The Edit, W, Numéro, and Document Journal. Her runway work has included appearances for different fashion brands.

For the H&M collaboration with Erdem, Hammam was one of the collection's ambassadors. Hammam became a brand ambassador for Estée Lauder in 2023.

== Personal life ==
Hammam is a Muslim. Although she has been described as being "Middle Eastern", she considers that misleading or incomplete label and identifies as Afro-Arab. In a 2015 interview, she said: "Sometimes people call me Middle Eastern, and I'm like, 'No, I'm black.' I am proud of my culture, proud of who made me, proud to be here." In a 2017 interview, she said: "I'm half Moroccan, half Egyptian, and I was born in Amsterdam. I'm Muslim, and I'm super proud of my heritage and of my roots. I want to be a role model for young girls who are struggling with racism or struggling with their looks or with their skin color. I had Naomi Campbell, who I looked up to as a black powerful woman. But there aren't many Arabic models, and being an African-Arabic model, I'm trying to open doors for more Arabic girls."

In June 2020, she shared a series of infographics on Instagram created by the Students for Justice in Palestine at Georgetown University. Her post was done to call attention to the Israeli–Palestinian conflict. In December 2021, she volunteered for a food kitchen in New York City, along with models Melodie Monrose, Madison Headrick, and Cora Emmanuel.

== Filmography ==
Music videos
Year	Title	Artist	Role	Note
2025	Gorgeous	Doja Cat	Herself	
