= Document Journal =

American culture, arts, and fashion magazine

- Editor-in-Chief & Creative Director: Nick Vogelson
- Frequency: Biannual
- Founded: 2012
- Final issue: 2025
- Company: Document Publishing
- Country: United States
- Based in: New York, NY
- Website: documentjournal.com

Document Journal was an independent culture, arts, and fashion magazine founded in New York in 2012. Published biannually in the spring and fall, the magazine is printed in book format and distributed globally.

Document focuses on American and global culture, and features prominent voices of art, literature, and fashion. Document's editor-in-chief and creative director is Nick Vogelson.

== Notable contributors ==
- Inez & Vinoodh
- Mert and Marcus
- Juergen Teller
- Joe McKenna
- Bruce Weber
- Mario Sorrenti
- Grace Coddington
- Hedi Slimane
- Richard Prince
- Collier Schorr
- Craig McDean
- Larry Clark
- Hans-Ulrich Obrist
- Rei Kawakubo
- Hilton Als
- Klaus Biesenbach
- Tyler Mitchell
