= Julie Hoomans =

Dutch fashion model (born 1997)

- Born: 28 May 1997 (age 29); Den Bosch, North Brabant, Netherlands
- Modeling information
- Height: 1.80 m (5 ft 11 in)
- Hair color: Blonde
- Eye color: Blue
- Agency: Next Model Management (New York, Paris, Milan, Los Angeles); Storm Model Management (London); Trend Model Management (Barcelona); Scoop Modells (Copenhagen); Visage Management (Zurich)

Julie Hoomans (born 28 May 1997) is a Dutch fashion model.

== Career ==
Hoomans was discovered while going shopping. She debuted at Prada S/S 2014, and walked for Altuzarra, Versace, Anthony Vaccarello, Dries Van Noten, and Maison Margiela. She has also walked for Louis Vuitton, Prada, Chanel, Gucci, Celine, Valentino, Carolina Herrera, Marni, Kenzo, Alexander McQueen, Mugler, Dior, Nina Ricci, Tommy Hilfiger, Christopher Kane, and many more.

Models.com chose her as one of the "Top Newcomers" of 2015. At the age of 19, she had already walked over 260 fashion shows. In 2018, Vogue reported that Hoomans would take a step back from modelling, to start studying at the University of Amsterdam. In 2020, Hoomans returned to full-time modeling, after graduating summa cum laude in Biomedical Sciences at Amsterdam University College.
