= Jasmine Tookes =

American fashion model (born 1991)

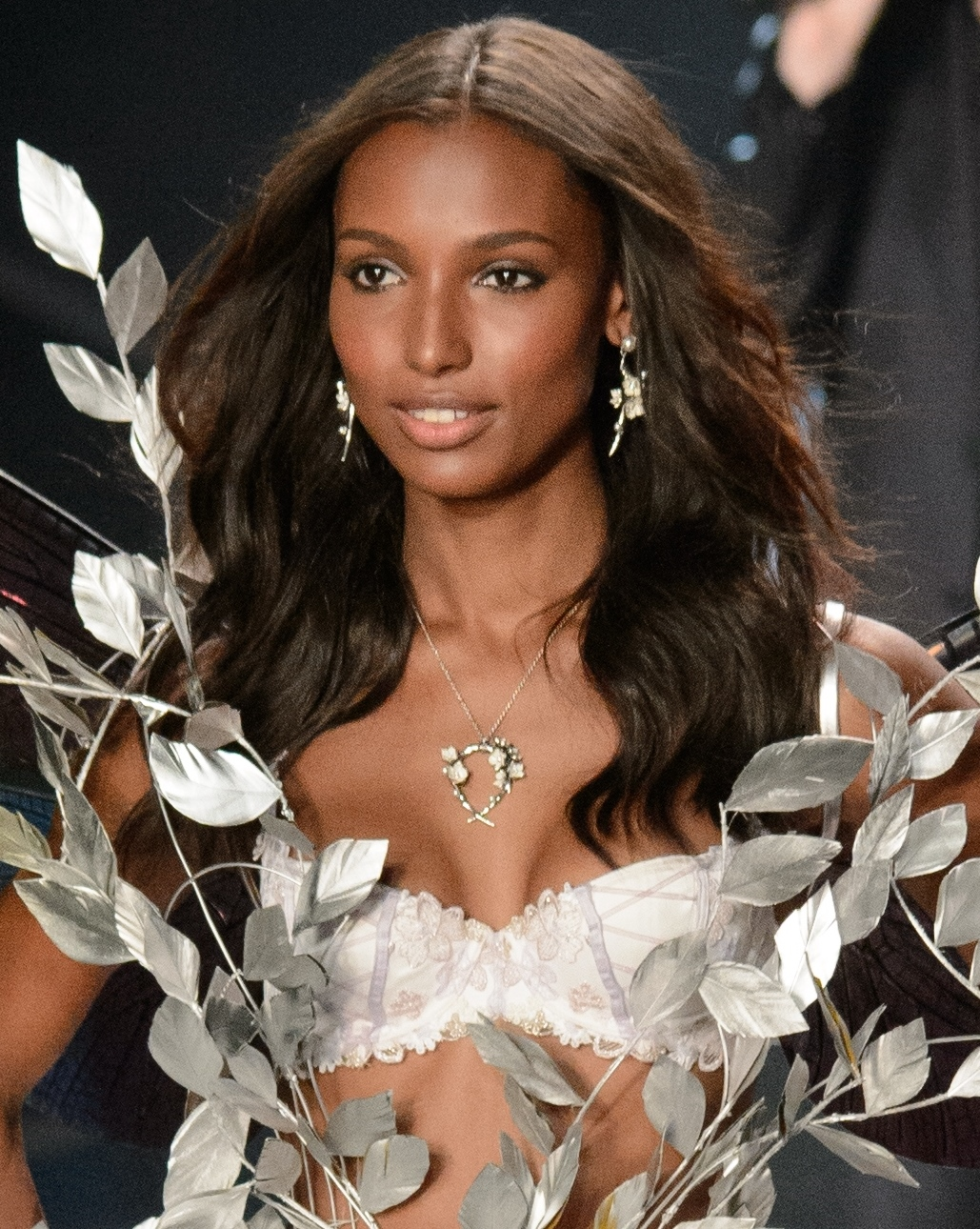
- Tookes at the Victoria's Secret Fashion Show 2014
- Born: February 1, 1991 (age 35); Huntington Beach, California, U.S.
- Occupation: Fashion model
- Years active: 2010–present
- Spouse: Juan Borrero (m. 2021)
- Children: 2
- Relatives: Alfredo Borrero (father-in-law)
- Modeling information
- Height: 5 ft 9 in (1.75 m)
- Hair color: Brown
- Eye color: Brown
- Agency: IMG Models (New York, Paris)

Jasmine Tookes (born February 1, 1991) is an American fashion model.

== Early life ==
Tookes was born and raised in Huntington Beach, California. She has a younger sister, who is 19 years her junior. She did gymnastics for ten years and was also active in volleyball and softball before she became a model at about the age of 15. Her mother is a celebrity fashion stylist. Tookes was discovered at one of her mother's showroom appointments.

Tookes has described her ancestry as a mix of "African American, Brazilian, European, and West Indian".

== Career ==
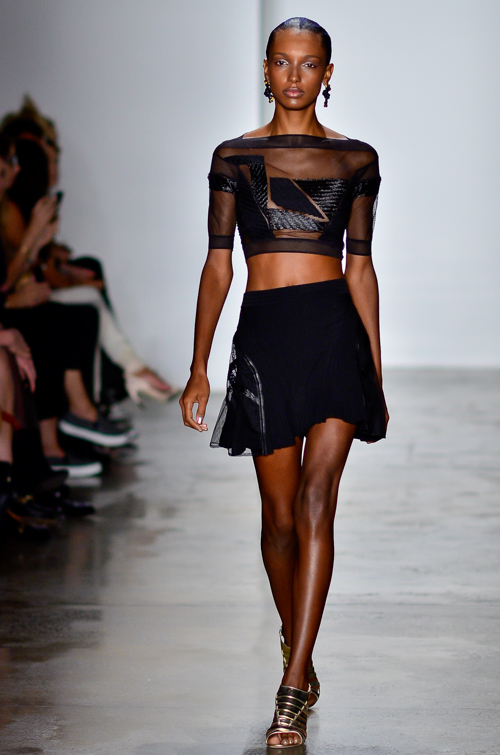
Tookes in 2013

Tookes' first commercial ad campaigns were in 2010 for UGG Australia and Gap. Before breaking out on the international scene, she booked a Spring 2011 DKNY campaign and a layout in Vogue Italia. Models.com named Tookes as one of the top 10 new models in a September 27, 2011, fashion week post. Tookes was selected by Style as its top new model in November 2011 based on her work for the Spring Fashion Shows. She was one of eleven new models for the annual Victoria's Secret Fashion Show in 2012. The 2012 show was taped in November and broadcast on the CBS network on December 4. The night before the airing of the fashion show, Tookes and fellow Victoria's Secret models Behati Prinsloo and Jacquelyn Jablonski guest starred on the December 3 "Ha'awe Make Loa" episode of CBS' Hawaii Five-0. French Vogue named her as one of its 10 New faces from fall/winter 2012–2013 Fashion Week.

Tookes has appeared in editorials for Italian, American, French, German, and Spanish Vogue, Harper's Bazaar, Numéro, W, and V. her covers include Elle France February 2013, Vogue Espana March 2016 alongside her fellow Victoria's Secret Angels, Harper's Bazaar Vietnam July 2016 along with Elsa Hosk and Martha Hunt, Maxim Magazine February 2017, and also Elle USA May 2017.

Tookes has walked the runways for Burberry, Salvatore Ferragamo, Carolina Herrera, Moschino, Ralph Lauren, DKNY, Shiatzy Chen, Herve Leger, Ermanno Scervino, Giorgio Armani, Philipp Plein, Missoni, Jason Wu, Alberta Ferretti, Emilio Pucci, Balmain, Marc Jacobs, Oscar de la Renta, Giambattista Valli, Vera Wang, Calvin Klein, Tom Ford, Yves Saint Laurent, Trussardi, Marchesa, Tory Burch, Dolce & Gabbana, Stella McCartney, Paco Rabanne, Helmut Lang, Louis Vuitton, DSquared², Tommy Hilfiger, Prada, Jill Stuart, rag+bone, Miu Miu and Versace.

Tookes and fellow VS Angel Josephine Skriver co-founded JOJA, an active-wear company.

Tookes has appeared in advertising campaigns for Bobbi Brown Cosmetics, Jimmy Choo, Calvin Klein, Lancôme, DKNY, Ralph Lauren, Kate Spade, Gap, Ugg, and Victoria's Secret. In 2015, she became a Victoria's Secret Angel. Tookes was selected to wear the Victoria's Secret Fashion Show Fantasy Bra (worth $3 million in 2016) at the 2016 show, which was held in Paris, France, which made her the 3rd black model to wear the bra. Tookes made her debut at No. 17 on Forbes' "The World's Highest Paid Models" list in 2016, with estimated earnings of $4 million.

Tookes was ranked Most Beautiful Face in the World by TC Candler in 2022. Tookes launched her first beauty brand Brunel on May 15, 2025.

Tookes opened the Victoria's Secret Fashion Show 2025 while pregnant in the opening segment “First Light”.

== Personal life ==
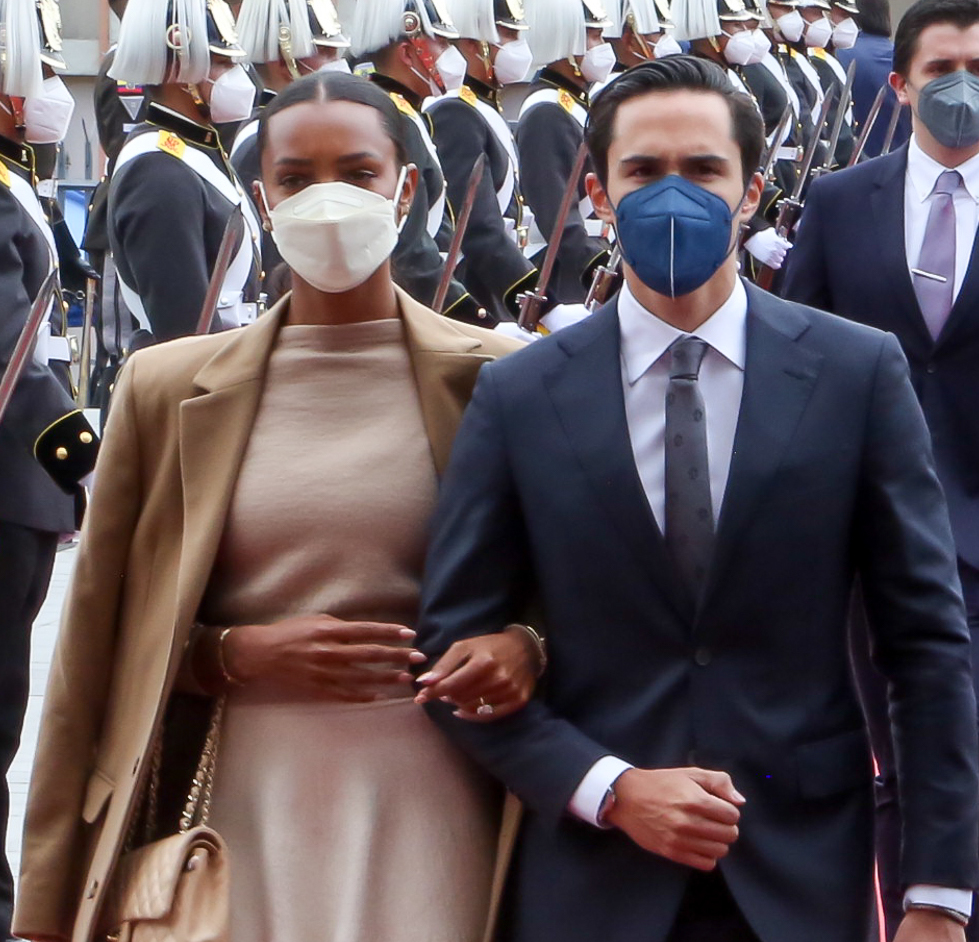
Tookes and Juan David Borrero at his father's inauguration as Vice President of Ecuador, May 2021

In September 2020, Tookes announced her engagement to her boyfriend of four years, Juan David Borrero. He is the director of international markets of Snap Inc. and the son of doctor Alfredo Borrero Vega, the former vice president of Ecuador. They married on September 4, 2021, at the Iglesia y Convento de San Francisco in Quito, Ecuador. On November 21, 2022, she announced on her Instagram account that they were expecting their first child. Their daughter was born on February 23, 2023. On July 9, 2025, she announced on her Instagram that they were expecting their second and on October 28, their son was born.
