= Daiane Sodre =

Brazilian model

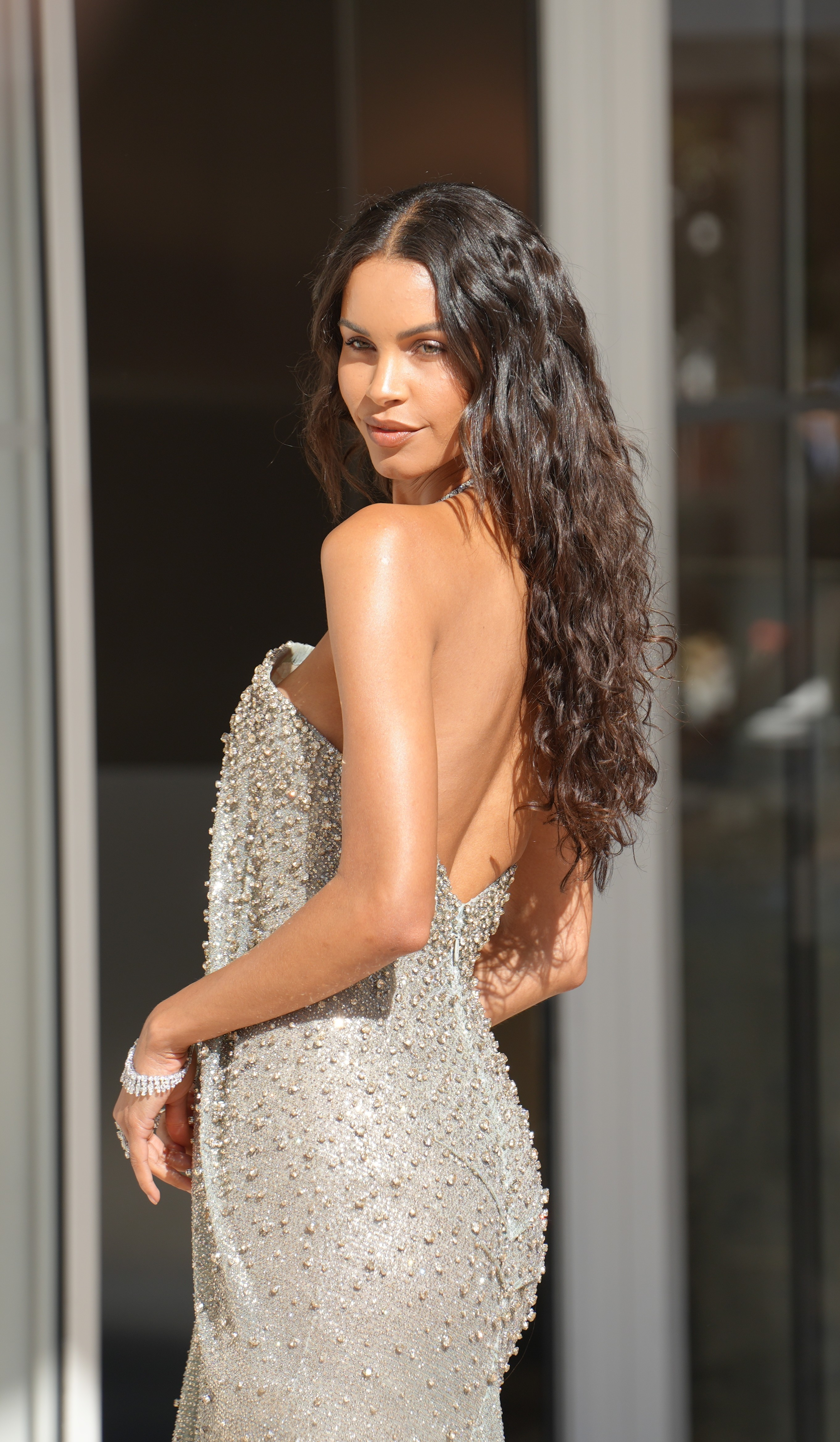
- Sodre at 2026 Cannes Film Festival
- Born: Daiane Sodre Da Silva; Baixa Grande, Bahia, Brazil
- Occupation: Model
- Modeling information
- Height: 1.80 m (5 ft 11 in)
- Hair color: Dark Brown
- Eye color: Green
- Website: daianesodre.com

Daiane Sodre Da Silva, known professionally as Daiane Sodre, is a Brazilian model.

== Early life ==
Daiane Sodre Da Silva was born in Baixa Grande, Brazil; a small town in the state of Bahia, to Julio Sodre and Analia Silva. She was named after Diana, Princess of Wales, whom her parents admired. Sodre grew up with her twelve older siblings.

== Career ==
Sodre began her career after being scouted by Dilson Stein, who also worked with Alessandra Ambrosio, Carol Trentini, and Gisele Bundchen.
