= Malika El Maslouhi =

Moroccan–Italian fashion model (born 1999)

- Born: 9 January 1999 (age 27); Milan, Italy
- Modeling information
- Height: 5 ft 11 in (180 cm)
- Hair color: Brown
- Eye color: Brown
- Agency: DNA Models (New York); VIVA Model Management (Paris, London, Barcelona); Why Not Model Management (Milan); LAKI Management (Milan) (mother agency)

Malika El Maslouhi (born 9 January 1999) is an Italian fashion model, of Moroccan and Italian descent. Vogue has described El Maslouhi as "beauty fit for a Fellini film."

== Early life ==
El Maslouhi was born in Milan on 9 January 1999 to a Moroccan father and an Italian mother. The family speaks two languages at home in Niguarda, Milan.

== Career ==
In February 2019, El Maslouhi debuted at Milan Fashion Week, walking for Alberta Ferretti. Her first runway show opening occurred in September 2019 at London Fashion Week for David Koma. She also had her first show closure in the same show.

El Maslouhi has modeled for Chanel, Dior, Gucci, Tommy Hilfiger, Calvin Klein, Ralph Lauren, Victoria's Secret, and Louis Vuitton. She has also featured in several international versions of Vogue, the Spanish version of Harper's Bazaar, and the French version of Elle.

El Maslouhi has also walked runways for Tory Burch, Brunello Cucinelli, Etro, Jacquemus, Lanvin, Moschino, Off-White, Elie Saab, and Vera Wang.
