= Felice Nova Noordhoff =

Dutch top model (born 2001)

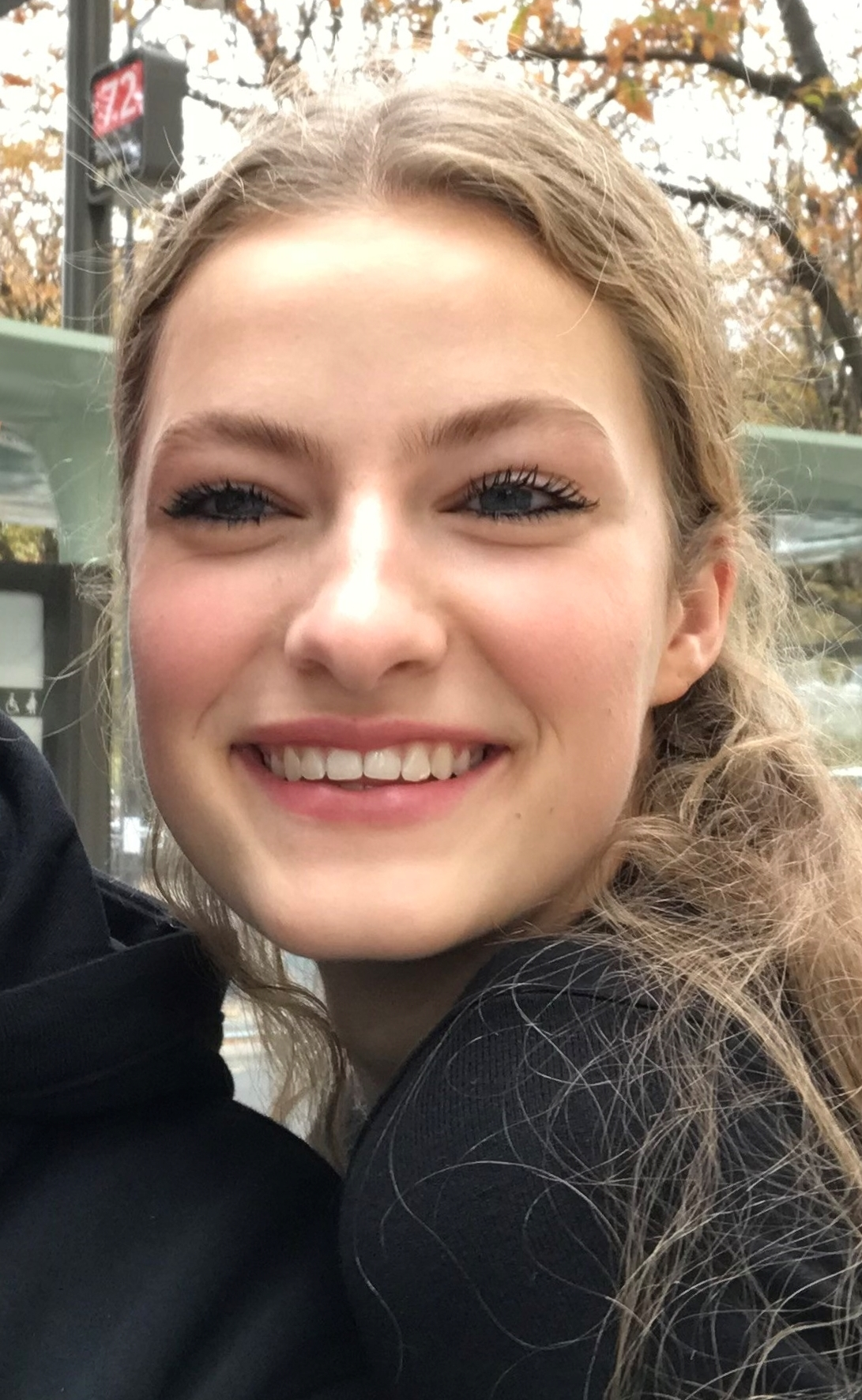
- Noordhoff in 2018
- Born: Felice Nova Noordhoff; June 1, 2001 (age 25); Bergen, North Holland, Netherlands
- Modeling information
- Height: 1.79 m (5 ft 10 1/2 in)
- Hair color: Blonde
- Eye color: Blue
- Agency: Elite Model Management (New York); Women Management (Milan and Paris); Storm Management (London); Scoop Models (Copenhagen); Micha Models (Amsterdam) (mother agency)

Felice Nova Noordhoff is a Dutch fashion model.

In December 2024, Models.com added Noordhoff to their 'Money List', saying that she had "attracted top-tier commercial clients and secured lucrative, long-term endorsement deals."

The Dutch edition of L'Officiel described Noordhoff as having an "angelic appearance," stating that it "quickly won [her] the hearts of many casting directors and fashion houses in Paris, London, and Milan."

== Early life ==
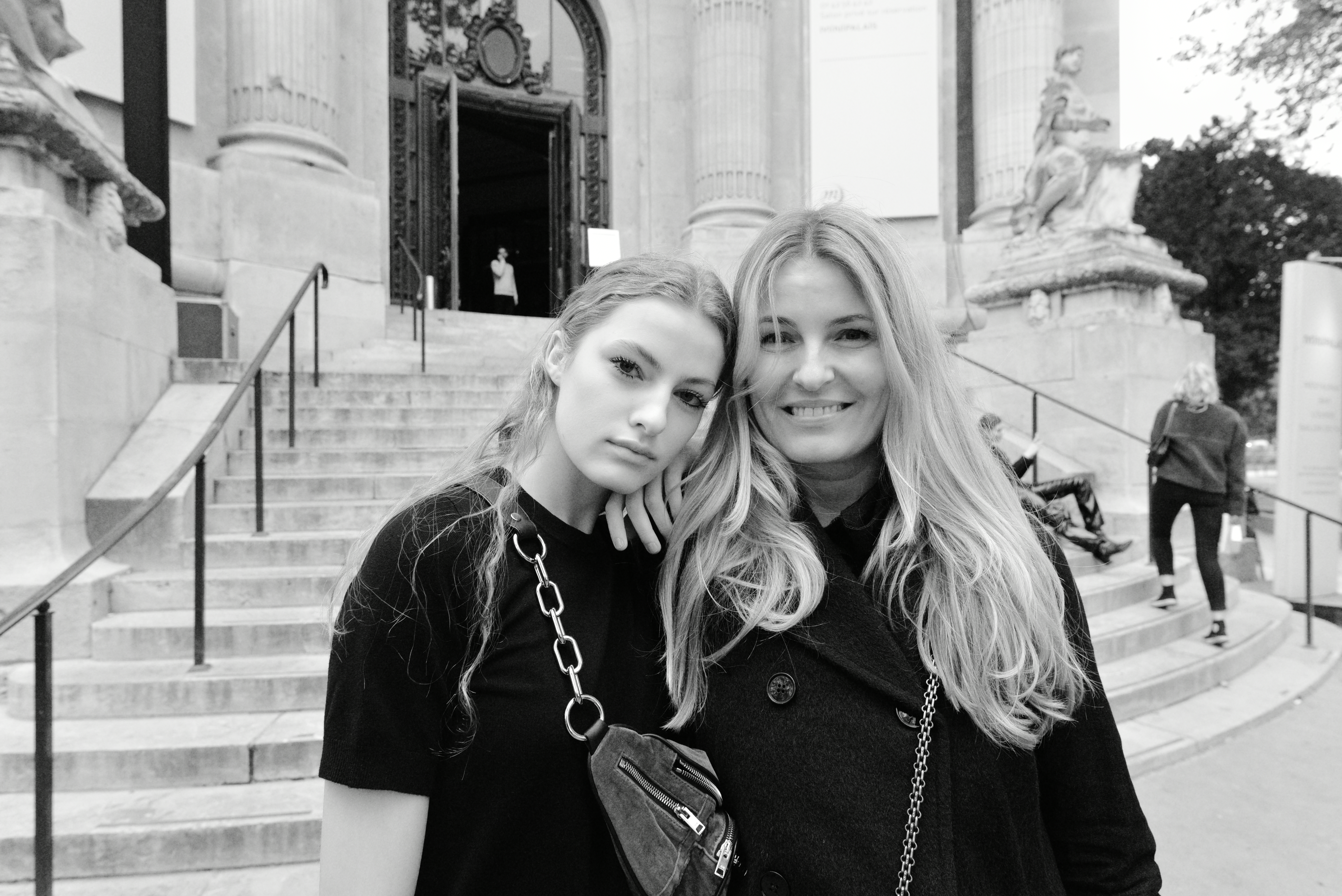
Noordhoff (left) with mother Leontien Wenneker in 2018

Noordhoff was born in the Dutch city of Alkmaar and grew up in Bergen. Her mother is Leontien Wenneker; Noordhoff has two siblings, a brother named Loïck and a sister named Fauve. She described her childhood as "pleasant", having often spent time in nature.

== Career ==
Nordhoff debuted as a Prada exclusive during the F/W 2017 season. She has walked in over 36 Chanel runway shows, and has also walked the runway for Givenchy, Max Mara, Valentino, Schiaparelli, Versace, Tom Ford, Stella McCartney, Saint Laurent, Ralph Lauren among many others.

In 2019 and 2020, she was nominated in the category Breakout Star Women and Model of the Year respectively at models.com's Model of the Year Awards.

In 2023, Noordhoff appeared in a Vogue Netherlands cover as well as an editorial with her mother, brother, sister, and boyfriend.

== Personal life ==
In an August 2023 interview with Dutch Vogue, Noordhoff spoke of her relationship with fellow model and creative director Khalil Ghani. She explained that they met through a mutual acquaintance—the fashion designer Riccardo Tisci. Noordhoff and Ghani went for a group dinner after a show, which Noordhoff says is where the "spark flew." Explaining of her relationship with Ghani, Noordhoff says: "It's so nice to be with someone [who] understands the fashion world. We talk about it a lot. I can tell my story to him, I don't have to explain the context. He knows how it works, understands the industry. We give each other feedback, advice, and share experiences."
