= Yasmin Wijnaldum =

Dutch fashion model (born 1998)

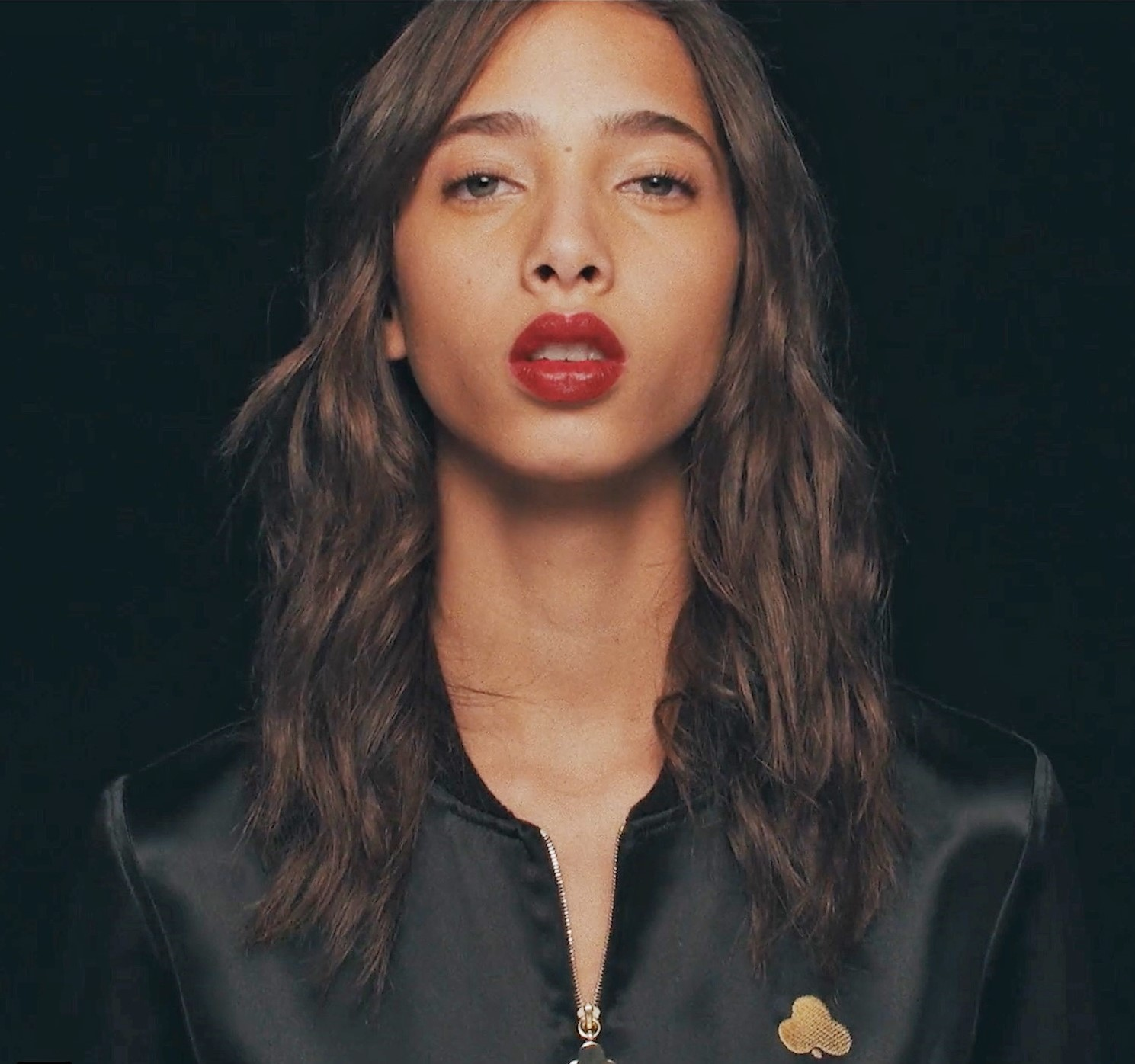
- Wijnaldum for Chaos in 2016
- Born: 10 July 1998 (age 28); Amsterdam, Netherlands
- Occupation: Model
- Years active: 2014–present
- Modeling information
- Height: 5 ft 10 in (1.78 m)
- Hair color: Brown
- Eye color: Blue
- Agency: The Society Management (New York); Elite Model Management (worldwide); Photogenics (LA); Seeds Management (Berlin); Munich Models (Munich)

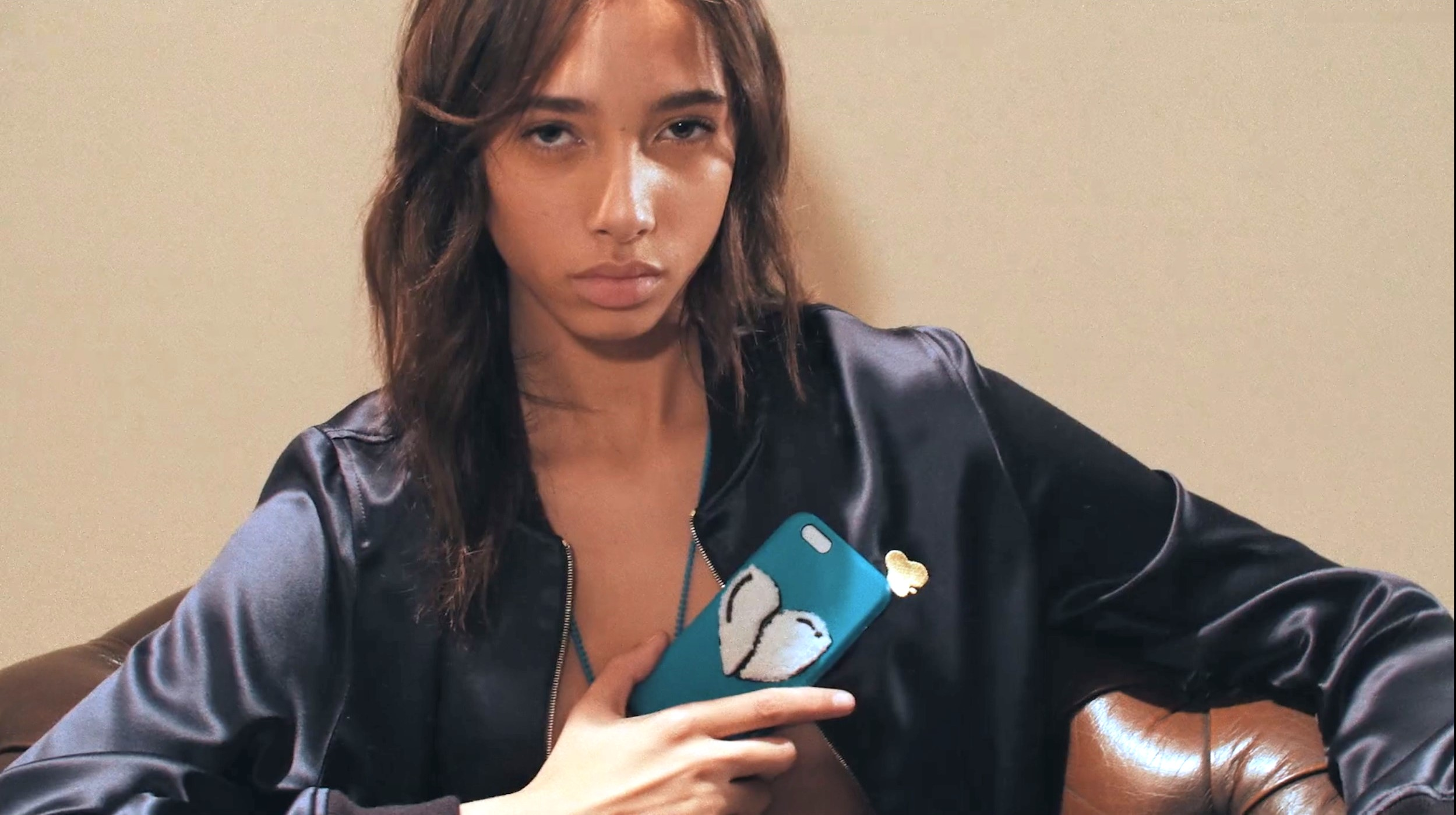
Wijnaldum for Chaos fashion accessory brand

Yasmin Wijnaldum (born 10 July 1998) is a Dutch fashion model. She is known for her confident runway walk.

== Early life ==
Wijnaldum was born in Amsterdam, Netherlands. Her father is from Suriname, and her mother is fully Dutch. She moved to New York at 16. She was a competitive dancer from age 6 to 16.

== Career ==
Wijnaldum made her modeling debut during the 2014 Elite Model Look competition, where she represented the Netherlands during the world final and won a contract with Elite Model Management's Amsterdam branch. After signing to Elite Worldwide and The Society, Wijnaldum made her runway debut at the Jean-Paul Gaultier Haute Couture F/W 15 show, and walked exclusively for Prada during the S/S 16 show season, where she subsequently booked the S/S 16 campaign alongside Sasha Pivovarova and Natalia Vodianova. Her first magazine cover was for I-D Magazine's Summer 2016 issue. In 2018, she made her debut at the 2018 Victoria's Secret Fashion Show.

In 2017, Wijnaldum was chosen as one of the "11 Models You Need to Know" by Vogue Arabia.

From 2017 to 2019, Wijnaldum was listed as one of Models' "Top 50" models and was also ranked on its former "Top Sexiest" list. She was ranked in 2018 on the Business of Fashion's annual list of 500 people shaping the fashion industry.

In 2021 Wijnaldum walked a singular show, that being Chanel SS22 #PFW. After that she went on a hiatus from runway for over a year. Up until July 2023 where she returned to the runway for Valentino Couture AW23. She didn’t make a full comeback until March 2024, walking with Moncler.

== Personal life ==
Wijnaldum previously dated American rapper G-Eazy in 2019 until he was linked to American rapper Megan Thee Stallion on Instagram in 2020.
