= Precious Lee =

American model

- Born: September 13, 1990 (age 35); Atlanta, Georgia, U.S.
- Education: Clark Atlanta University
- Occupations: Model, actress, writer
- Modeling information
- Height: 5 ft 11 in (1.80 m)
- Agency: IMG
- Website: www.instagram.com/preciousleexoxo

Precious Lee (born September 13, 1990) is an American model. She gained prominence as the first African American curve model to work with longstanding fashion houses. She has walked for Versace, Moschino, Fendi, and others.

== Early life ==
Lee was born and raised in Atlanta, Georgia. Her father is an entrepreneur and her mother is a retired educator and model. She has two older sisters, and one older brother. Her sister, Charisma, died in a car accident when Lee was a child.

Lee was an active student and participated in competitive cheerleading, student government, debate club, thespian club, and concert band. In her senior year she was crowned homecoming queen. She enjoyed fashion from her youth and was particularly inspired by her sister Charisma and parents' attire.

== Career ==
Lee began modeling while as a student at Clark Atlanta University, when she attended an Elite Models open call to support a friend and instead received a contract offer. She started her career doing catalog shoots and modeled part-time as an undergraduate. Lee moved to New York after college to pursue modeling full-time after signing with Ford Models, with plans to attend law school if her modeling career did not pan out. She named Crystal Renn and Toccara Jones as "curve" models (those bigger than sample size) who inspired her.

She has walked for Fendi, Mugler, Lanvin, Tommy Hilfiger, Balmain, Versace, Michael Kors, Moschino and more. She has also modeled couture for Jean Paul Gaultier, and she has a long-term partnership with YSL Beauty. She has covered Vogue, British Vogue, Vogue Arabia, Vogue Brazil, Vogue Portugal, Vogue Netherlands, Italian Vogue twice, Harper's Bazaar, Dazed Magazine, iD Magazine, Elle, Elle Brazil, Elle UK, and others. Lee fulfilled a special aspiration when she walked in the spring 2021 Versace show; she was the first Black curve model to do so for the first time in the history of the brand.

Lee made her acting debut in 2021 on the Starz series Run the World. She was also a guest judge on Project Runway.

In 2023, Lee starred in the music video of "Spin Bout U" by rappers Drake and 21 Savage.

== Accolades ==
- Nominee, 2020 Breakout Star, Models.com
- Nominee, 2021 Model of the Year, Models.com
- Winner, 2022 GQ Portugal International Model of the Year
