= Anok Yai =

American fashion model (born 1997)

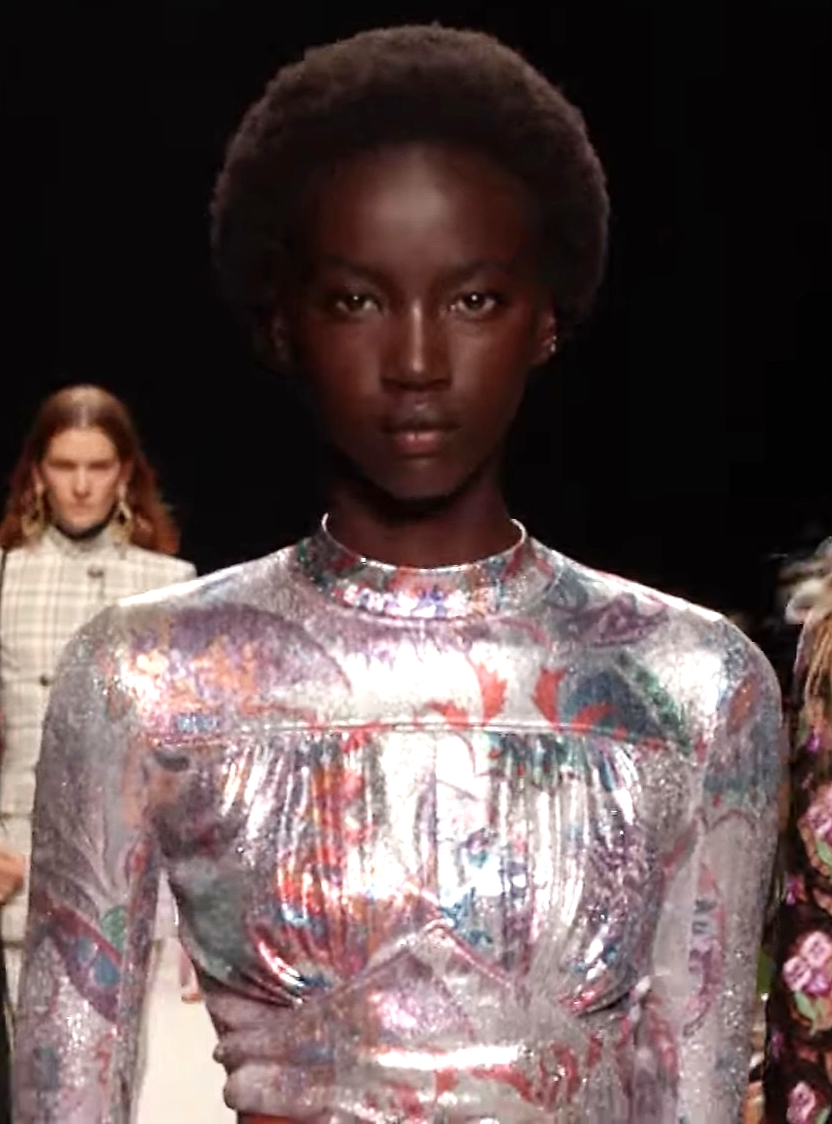
- Yai in September 2019
- Born: December 20, 1997 (age 28); Cairo, Egypt
- Education: Plymouth State University; Manchester High School West
- Occupation: Model
- Years active: 2017–present
- Modeling information
- Height: 1.78 m (5 ft 10 in)
- Hair color: Brown
- Eye color: Brown
- Agency: IMG Models; No Smoking (New York); SAFE Management (Paris)

Anok Yai (/əˈnɒk/ ə-NOK; born December 20, 1997) is an American fashion model. She is the second Black model, after Naomi Campbell, to open a Prada show. She has made several appearances on Vogue covers, including American Vogue three times. TIME named her one of the 100 most influential people in world in 2026.

== Early life ==
Yai was born in Cairo, Egypt, after her family fled genocide in Sudan. She comes from a Dinka Christian family. When she was 3, her family moved to Manchester, New Hampshire, United States. Her mother is a nurse and her father works for Easterseals; her sister Alim is her manager and a financial consultant. Yai graduated from Manchester High School West and attended Plymouth State University studying biochemistry, intending to become a doctor.

== Career ==
=== 2017–2021: Discovery and career beginnings ===
Yai was discovered in October 2017 during Howard University's homecoming week by professional photographer Steve 'theSUNK' Hall, who asked to take her picture. He posted the photo on Instagram, acquiring over 20,000 likes. Modeling agencies, including IMG Models, asked to get in touch with her. She eventually chose to sign with Next Model Management, who had called her daily for several weeks. Four months later, she became the first Sudanese model to open a Prada fashion show. She has also appeared in the Prada SS 2018 campaign and a Nike campaign designed by Givenchy's Riccardo Tisci.

On being the first Black model to open Prada in 20 years, Yai told Vogue:

"It was an honor and I'm proud that I was the one chosen to open, but this is bigger than me. Me opening for one of the top fashion houses is a statement to the world–especially for Black women–that their beauty is something that deserves to be celebrated."

Yai has walked the runways for brands including Versace, Max Mara, Fendi, Burberry, and Louis Vuitton. She has also appeared in advertisements for Tiffany & Co., Nike, Hood by Air, and Ambush.

Yai has appeared on the covers and editorials of Vogue (including several of international editions), W magazine, CR Fashion Book, AnOther, Dust, Purple, Harper's Bazaar, i-D, Self Service, V Magazine, Elle, Garage, Document Journal, Dazed, and Pop.

In 2018, Yai appeared in an advertising campaign for a S/S Nike, Riccardo Tisci, and Minotaurs collaboration. In July 2018, she became an Estée Lauder spokes model. In December 2018, she was featured in a campaign for Alexander Wang's "Collection 1" Drop 2.

In 2019, Yai appeared in a short film for the Chanel-Pharrell Collection, alongside Adut Akech and Alton Mason. She was featured on the covers of AnOther, CR Fashion Book, PRINT, W, Vogue (including its Korean, Italian, Brazilian, and Japanese editions).

In 2020, Yai modeled for the Versace Resort "Flash 2021" campaign. She appeared in the Alexander McQueen F/W 2020 campaign, photographed by Jamie Hawkesworth. Yai once again appeared on cover of Vogue (its Japanese, German, Dutch, and American editions).

In 2021, Yai starred in the Ambush S/S 2021 collection campaign photographed by Ethan James Green. She led Hood by Air's "02 PROLOGUE" campaign photoshoot in June 2021. Juergen Teller photographed her for a Yves Saint Laurent Winter 2021 advertisement. In September 2021, she appeared on the cover of Vogue along with other models including Ariel Nicholson, Bella Hadid, and Kaia Gerber.

=== 2022–present: Supermodel status ===
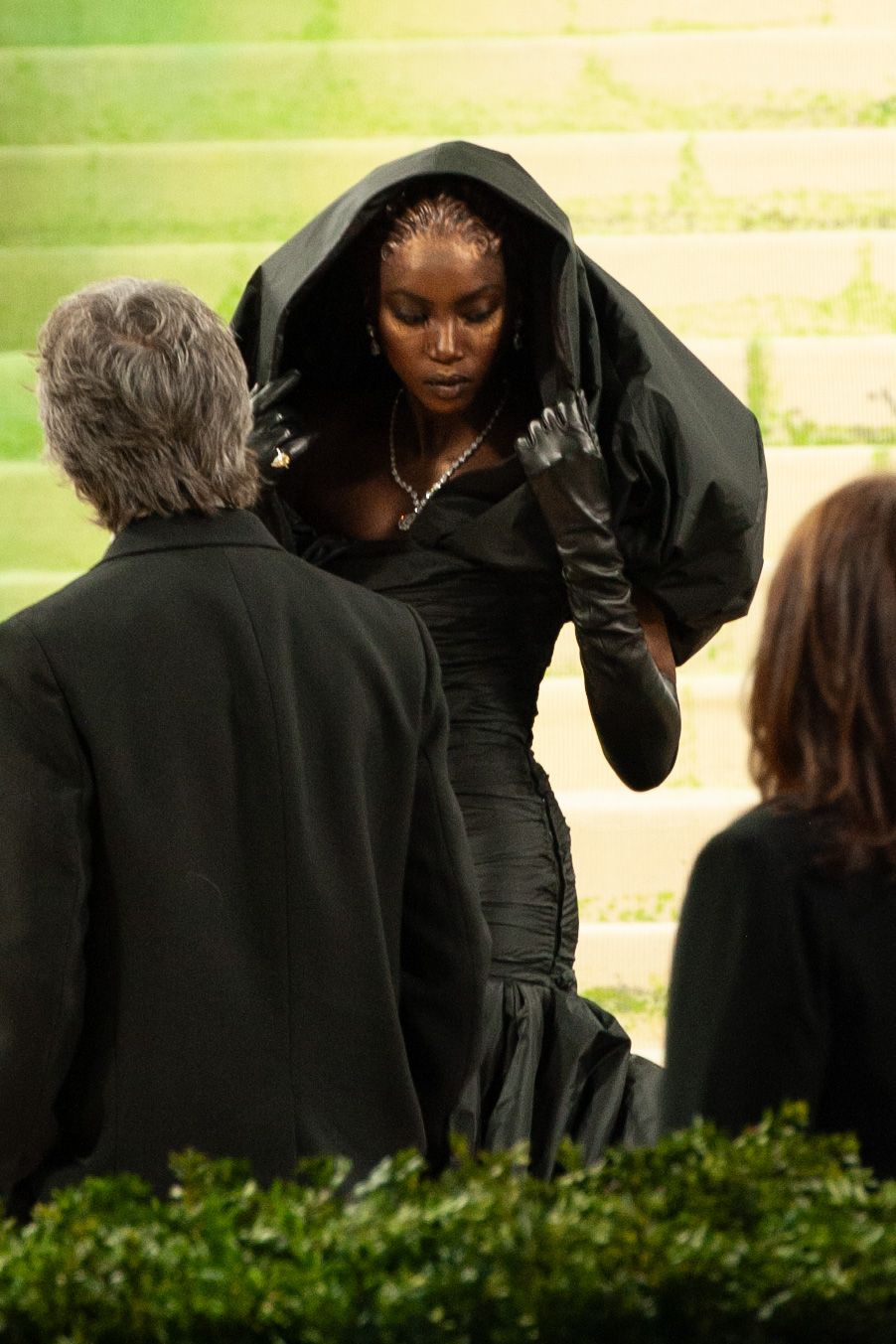
Yai at the 2026 Met Gala

In 2022, Yai appeared in two S/S campaigns shot by Steven Meisel for Max Mara and Alexander McQueen. She modeled for Loro Piana in a photoshoot shot by Mario Sorrenti. Yai reunited with Meisel for a September campaign for Tiffany & Co. Rose Gold Eau de Parfum. In February 2022, she appeared on the cover of British Vogue alongside an all Black modeling cast. Yai appeared on the September 2022 cover of W, celebrating the magazine's 50th anniversary. On this cover, the magazine recognized Yai as a supermodel.

In 2023, Yai was featured in a Vogue tribute cover to Karl Lagerfeld, photographed by Annie Leibovitz. She also covered Vogue Spain, Vogue Italy and i-D. Yai appeared in the music video for the song "Say Something" by American rapper Lil Yachty. During Paris Fashion Week, Yai opened her first Mugler runway show. She attended the 2023 Met Gala in custom Prabal Gurung, for which Vogue Australia ranked Yai "one of the "best dressed supermodels." In December 2023, Yai was awarded Industry's vote and the Reader's Choice as Model of the Year: Women+ by models.com.

In 2024, Yai walked for the Louis Vuitton Men's F/W show during Paris Fashion Week. She next starred in American rapper Travis Scott's music video "I KNOW?" Also in 2024, she became the face of Alien Hypersense, a new fragrance by Mugler. Later in 2024, Yai appeared in the music video for Offset's "Swing My Way".

In December 2025, Yai was awarded Model of the Year by the British Fashion Council.

== Personal life ==
=== Health ===
In December 2025, Yai posted on Instagram about her health, writing “For the past year I’ve been dealing with this silent battle”, and adding “I incidentally found out I had a congenital defect overworking my heart and slowly destroying my lungs.”

== Filmography ==
Key
†	Denotes productions that have not yet been released

Media appearances
Year	Title	Role	Notes	Ref.
2019	Chanel - The Chanel Pharrell Collection	Herself	Short film	
2020	Saint Laurent - Summer of '21	Herself	Short film	
2023	Lil Yachty - "Say Something"	Herself	Music video	
2024	Travis Scott - "I Know ? (Official Music Video)"	Herself	Music video	
2024	Offset - "Swing My Way"	Herself	Music video	
2025	Doja Cat - "Gorgeous"		Music video	
2026	The Devil Wears Prada 2	Herself	Movie	
TBA	Michael 2 †	Naomi Campbell	Debut film	
