= Liu Wen (model) =

Chinese model (born 1988)

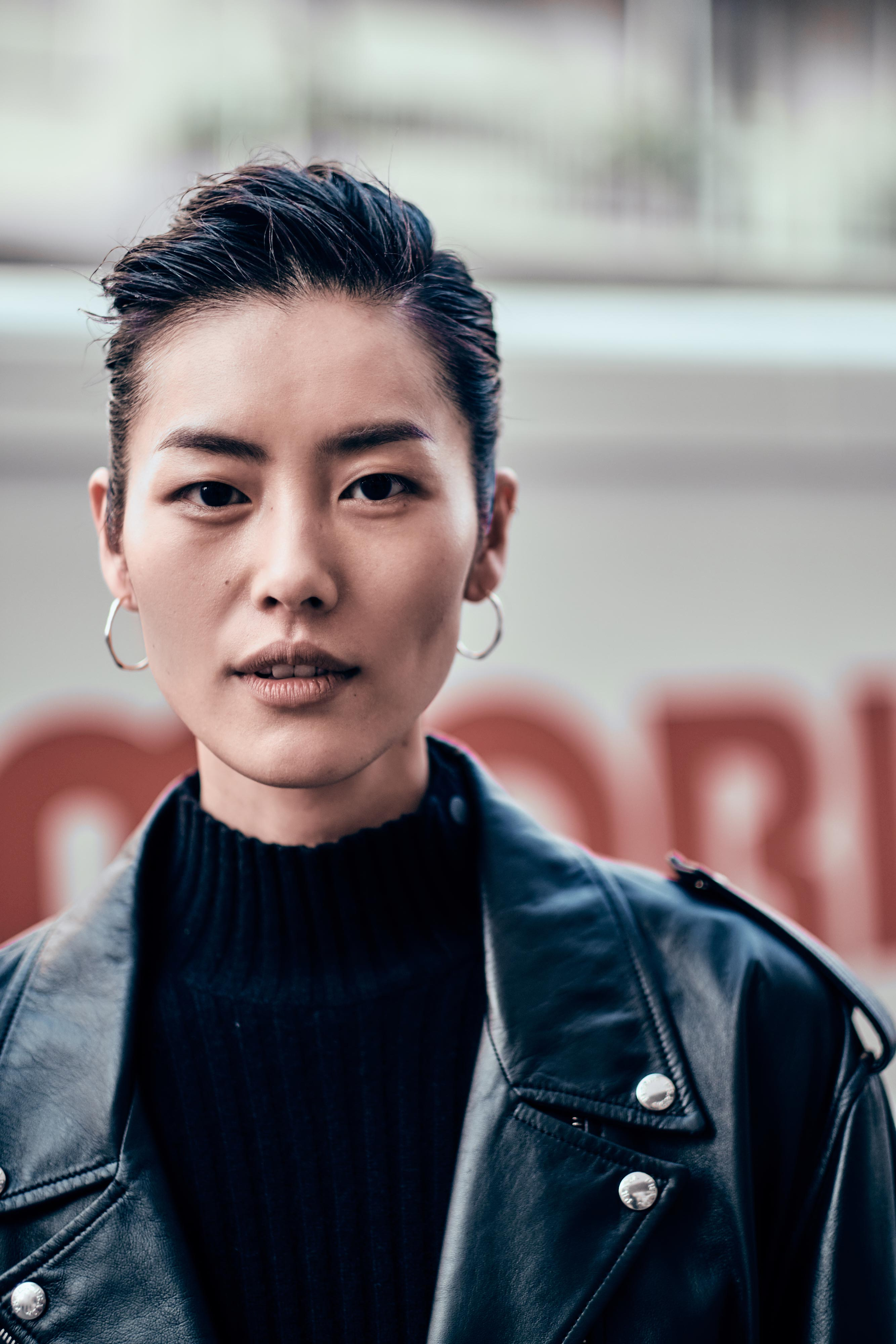
- Wen in 2019
- Born: 27 January 1988 (age 38); Yongzhou, Hunan, China
- Modeling information
- Height: 5 ft 10 in (1.78 m)
- Hair color: Black
- Eye color: Brown
- Agency: The Society Management (New York); Elite Model Management (Paris, Milan, London, Barcelona)

Liu Wen (simplified Chinese: 刘雯; traditional Chinese: 劉雯; pinyin: Liú Wén; born 27 January 1988) is a Chinese model. She is widely regarded as China's first supermodel. She was the first Chinese model to walk the Victoria's Secret Fashion Show, the first East Asian spokesmodel for Estée Lauder cosmetics, and the first Asian model to ever make Forbes magazine's annual highest-paid models list. In 2017, Liu became the second Chinese model to ever appear on the cover of American Vogue, and the first to be featured on the front cover rather than foldout. She landed on the cover a second time in American Vogue's April 2020 issue and a third in May 2023, becoming the first person of Chinese descent to appear three times. In 2024, she became the first model of Asian descent to be featured solo on the cover of French Vogue.

== Early life ==
Liu was born in Lingling District, Yongzhou, Hunan Province, China. Her father was a construction worker. She is an only child.

Liu was encouraged by her mother to pursue modeling in order to improve her posture after she developed the habit of hunching her back as she towered over her classmates.

== Career ==
=== 2005–2008: Early career ===
In 2005, 17-year old Liu won the semi-final of the New Silk Road World model contest in her home province of Hunan. She was motivated to participate because the winning prize included a new laptop. Although she didn't place in the top 10 during the national final, she was offered to model in Beijing. When Liu was 17, she moved to Beijing to start her career. She initially struggled to find jobs because her appearance didn't match the commercial look that was in-demand at the time. However, Liu eventually became a sought-after model and gained first attention by the international modeling industry in 2007, when she appeared in an editorial for Cosmopolitan China, styled in Karl Lagerfeld and Viktor & Rolf. She also appeared on the cover of the September issue of Marie Claire China.

In February 2008, Liu appeared in four fashion-related articles for Vogue China. She debuted on international runways in the same month, walking for Burberry and closing the fall Trussardi show in Milan. The week after, she walked for Chanel, Jean Paul Gaultier, and Hermès in Paris. She followed that up with the Spring 2010 ready-to-wear season, walking 70 shows in the same four cities. This statistic made her the second most booked model for the season following French model Constance Jablonski.

=== 2009–2013: Rise to prominence ===
In 2009, Liu appeared in 74 shows for the Fall 2009 season, including those for Calvin Klein, Roberto Cavalli, Alexander Wang, Dolce & Gabbana, and Oscar de la Renta — this was the highest number shows for a model in that season. It also remains the record for the most shows ever walked by a model of Asian descent in a single season. She appeared on the covers of Elle China and Vogue Portugal. She also became the first model of Asian descent to walk in the Victoria's Secret Fashion Show.

Liu appeared in the Spring 2010 campaign for ck by Calvin Klein. She appeared on the covers of Vogue China. She became the first Asian face of Estée Lauder. She also attended the Met Gala for the first time.

In 2011, Liu appeared on the cover of i-D. She also appeared in the Fall 2011 campaign of Dolce & Gabbana.

In 2012, The New York Times featured Liu on the cover of their T Magazine's Travel Issue, dubbing her as "China’s first bona fide supermodel". In the same year, Liu attended the Cannes Film Festival for the first time. She also appeared in the Resort 2013 campaign for Balenciaga.

In 2013, Liu appeared in the campaigns for Hugo Boss, Oscar de la Renta, Roberto Cavalli, and Coach. She also appeared on the cover of Vogue Thailand.

In 2013, Liu became the first Asian to make the Forbes' list of the world's highest-paid models, as number 5. She repeated the feat in 2014, with her salary rising from $4.3 million the previous year to $7 million. Also in 2013, Liu ranked third on the Models.com Top 50 Models Women List.

=== 2014–present: Continued success ===
In 2014, Liu became the first person in the world to showcase an Apple Watch on a magazine cover when she appeared on the November issue of Vogue China. She became a brand ambassador for La Perla. In the same year, Models.com elevated her to the status of "New Supers", the first Asian model to ever receive that honor.

In 2015, Liu appeared on the covers of Harper's Bazaar China and Vogue Japan. She appeared in the campaign for Tiffany & Co. She participated in the Chinese spin-off of South Korean variety show We Got Married with South Korean singer Choi Siwon.

In 2016, Liu appeared on the cover of the October issue of Vogue Italia. She also appeared on the covers of Elle France and Madame Figaro France. She became a brand ambassador for Puma.

In 2017, Liu appeared on the March issue of American Vogue, becoming the second Asian model to appear on the cover of American Vogue and the first to be featured on its main front cover rather than a foldout page.

Liu became a Chanel brand ambassador in 2017. In 2018, she appeared in Chanel's Les Beiges campaign. In 2019, she appeared in its Ultra Le Teint and J12 campaigns. In 2020, she appeared in its "Colours of Chanel" makeup campaign. In 2022, she appeared in its N°1 de Chanel campaign. In 2024, she appeared in its Eyewear campaign. In 2025, she appeared in its Métiers d’art campaign.

In 2018, Liu appeared in the campaigns for Chloé and Prada.

In 2019, Liu appeared in the campaigns for Prada, Tod's, and Calvin Klein. She also became a brand ambassador for Coach and starred in its Fall campaign. However, she terminated her relationship with the brand after it faced a backlash for a T-shirt design that listed Hong Kong and Taiwan separately from China.

In 2020, Liu appeared on the cover of the April issue of American Vogue. She appeared in the Fall campaign for Valentino. She became a brand ambassador for Arc'teryx.

In 2021, Liu appeared in the campaigns for Tory Burch, Gucci, Giorgio Armani, and Loewe. She appeared on the covers of WSJ Magazine China, Vogue Singapore, and Harper's Bazaar US. She became a brand ambassador for JD.com.

Liu appeared in the Spring 2022 campaign for Gucci. She became an ambassador for Bulgari Fragrances, Accessories, and Leather Goods and for Net-a-Porter.

In 2023, Liu appeared on the cover of the May issue of American Vogue. She also appeared on the covers of W, Pop, and W China. She appeared in the campaigns for Gucci, Givenchy, Tory Burch, Alexander McQueen, Bottega Veneta, and Versace. She opened the Bottega Veneta's Winter 2023 show in Beijing.

In 2024, Liu appeared in the campaigns for Prada, Fendi, Bottega Veneta, Rabanne, and Rimowa. She appeared on the cover of the March issue of Vogue France. She also appeared on the cover of W China and opened the Chanel Métiers d’Art 2025 fashion show in Hangzhou.

In 2025, Liu appeared in the campaigns for Prada, Ferragamo, and Burberry.

== Controversy ==
In February 2018, Liu Wen posted a photo on Instagram showing herself and Wendi Deng Murdoch with the English caption "Happy Lunar New Year!", which drew a large group of Chinese netizens accusing her of forgetting her Chinese roots and pandering to other Asian countries. Numerous other Chinese and international netizens defended her usage of the phrase. As a result, she changed the English caption to "Happy Chinese New Year" later.

== Personal life ==
In the past, Liu has said that after modeling she might enjoy working as a stylist or, were the opportunity to arise, as an actress—she feels that modelling and acting have much in common, but for now she enjoys modeling and working in the fashion industry. She has stated that she knows that, as a career choice, working as a fashion designer or stylist would be "very hard work", but she is now more seriously considering becoming a stylist because she would like "to share her fashion style—tomboyish, vintage, and comfortable—with the world".

In 2022, she began dating actor Jing Boran.

== Filmography ==
=== Reality shows ===
Year	English title	Chinese title	Role
2015	We Are In Love	我们相爱吧	
2019	Adventure Life 2	奇遇人生第二季	
2020	Nice To Meet You	很高兴认识你	
2021	Wow! Mom	妈妈，你真好看	Mentor

== See also ==
- Chinese in New York City
- Fashion designer
