= Vogue Nederland =

Dutch fashion magazine

VOGUE Nederland

- First issue of Vogue Nederland (March 2012)
- Editor: Yeliz Çiçek
- Categories: Fashion
- Frequency: monthly
- Founded: 2012; 14 years ago
- Country: Netherlands
- Website: www.vogue.nl

Vogue Nederland is the Dutch edition of the American fashion and lifestyle magazine Vogue, published by Condé Nast. The magazine has been published since March 2012, which is over a hundred years later than the original Vogue, which has been published since 1892. The magazine's first cover featured the Dutch models Romée Strijd, Ymre Stiekema and Josefien Rodermans. The first editor in chief was Karin Sweerink who held the position till 2019 when she was appointed as editor in chief of Linda magazine. She was succeeded by Rinke Tjepkema in 2019 and by Yeliz Çiçek in 2022 - who led the magazine for two years and stopped in 2024.

Vogue Nederland is published by Bloom Publishing (print) and Talpa Networks under licensing of Condé Nast Publications.

Vogue Nederland current circulation is approximately 60,000 copies.

== See also ==
- List of Vogue Netherlands cover models
