= List of people on the cover of Maxim magazine =

This is a list of celebrities who have appeared on the cover of Maxim magazine.

== 1997 ==
Issue	Cover star
#1. May	Christa Miller
#2. Summer	Jill Hennessy
#3. Sept/Oct	Carmen Electra
#4. November	Gena Lee Nolin

== 1998 ==
Issue	Cover star
#5. January & February	Famke Janssen
#6. March	Alyssa Milano
#7. April	Natasha Henstridge
#8. May	Donna D'Errico
#9. June	Rebecca Romijn
#10. July & August	Catherine Zeta-Jones
#11. September	Christina Applegate
#12. October	Rebecca Gayheart
#13. November	Jennifer Esposito
#14. December	Yasmine Bleeth

== 1999 ==
Issue	Cover star
#15. January & February	Bridget Fonda
#16. March	Rose McGowan
#17. April	Lucy Lawless
#18. May	Caprice Bourret
#19. June	Shannen Doherty
#20. July & August	Michelle Williams
#21. September	Pamela Anderson
#22. October	Melissa Joan Hart
#23. November	Jennifer Love Hewitt
#24. December	Lara Flynn Boyle

== 2000 ==
Issue	Cover star
#25. January	Shannon Elizabeth
#26. February	Kim Smith
#27. March	Jenny McCarthy
#28. April	Jodi Lyn O'Keefe
#29. May	Kristy Swanson
#30 June	Katherine Heigl
#31. July	Halle Berry, Rebecca Romijn & Famke Janssen
#32. August	Tyra Banks & Izabella Miko
#33. September	Kirsten Dunst
#34. October	Jessica Alba
#35. November	Yamila Diaz, Michelle Behennah, & Magdalena Wróbel
#36. December	Tara Reid

== 2001 ==
Issue	Cover star
#37. January	Laura Prepon
#38. February	Denise Richards
#39. March	Monica Potter
#40. April	Ali Larter
#41. May	Eliza Dushku
#42. June	Saira Mohan & Jennifer Lamiraqui
#43. July	Brittany Murphy
#44. August	Helena Bonham Carter
#45. September	Jamie-Lynn Sigler
#46. October	Jolene Blalock
#47. November	Jules Asner
#48. December	Jaime Pressly

== 2002 ==
Issue	Cover star
#49. January	Jessica Simpson
#50. February	Amanda Marcum
#51. March	Tara Reid
#52. April	Leonor Varela
#53. May	Kelly Hu
#54. June	Jeri Ryan
#55. July	Shakira
#56. August	Beyoncé
#57. September	Lucy Liu
#58. October	Mila Kunis
#59. November	Rebecca Romijn
#60. December	Carmen Electra, Christina Aguilera, & Christina Applegate

== 2003 ==
Issue	Cover star
#61. January	Christina Aguilera
#62. February	Minki van der Westhuizen
#63. March	Brooke Burns
#64. April	Sarah Wynter
#65. May	Monica Bellucci
#66. June	Shania Twain
#67. July	Cameron Diaz, Lucy Liu & Drew Barrymore
#68. August	Anna Kournikova & Paige Butcher
#69. September	Mariah Carey
#70. October	Gina Gershon
#71. November	Jessica Alba
#72. December	Shannon Elizabeth

== 2004 ==
Issue	Cover star
#73. January	Michelle Branch
#74. February	Paige Butcher
#75. March	Elisha Cuthbert
#76. April	Marge Simpson & Paris Hilton
#77. May	Josie Maran
#78. June	Jessica Simpson
#79. July	Kim Smith
#80. August	Anna Kournikova
#81. September	Milla Jovovich
#82. October	Avril Lavigne
#83. November	Laura Prepon
#84. December	Maria Boren & Jennifer Crisafulli

== 2005 ==
Issue	Cover star
#85. January	Eva Longoria
#86. February	Brooke Burns
#87. March	Jennifer Love Hewitt
#88. April	Sara Foster
#89. May	Brittany Murphy
#90. June	Vanessa Marcil
#91. July	Carmen Electra & Kim Smith
#92. August	Nicky Hilton
#93. September	Kelly Monaco
#94. October	Vanessa Minnillo
#95. November	Nicollette Sheridan
#96. December	Cindy Crawford

== 2006 ==
Issue	Cover star
#97. January	Haylie Duff
#98. February	Emmanuelle Vaugier
#99. March	Kristen Bell
#100. April; Anniversary Issue	—
#101. May	Jamie-Lynn Sigler
#102. June	Veronika Vařeková
#103. July	Jessica Simpson
#104. August	Elsa Pataky
#105. September	Eva Longoria
#106. October	Vanessa Lachey
#107. November	Sophia Bush, Hilarie Burton & Danneel Harris
#108. December	Angelina Jolie

== 2007 ==
Issue	Cover star
#109. January	Lacey Chabert
#110. February	Eva Mendes
#111. March	Christina Aguilera
#112. April	Fergie
#112. April; Special Collectors Edition	Rose McGowan
#113. May	Roselyn Sánchez
#114. June	Sarah Silverman
#115. July	Megan Fox
#116. August	Hilary Duff
#117. September	Lindsay Lohan
#118. October	Erica Durance
#118. October; Limited Edition	Ben Stiller
#119. November	Eva Mendes
#120. December	Sarah Michelle Gellar

== 2008 ==
Issue	Cover star
#121. January	Mischa Barton
#122. February	Heidi Montag
#123. March	Avril Lavigne
#124. April	Jaime King
#125. May	Elisha Cuthbert
#126. June	Shannon Elizabeth
#127. July	Marisa Miller
#128. August	Amber Heard
#129. September	Anna Kournikova
#130. October	Megan Fox
#131. November	Stacy Keibler
#132. December	Olga Kurylenko

== 2009 ==
Issue	Cover star
#133. January	Hilary Duff
#134. February	Jamie Gunns
#135. March	Eliza Dushku
#136. April	Malin Åkerman
#137. May	Jennifer Love Hewitt
#138. June	Moon Bloodgood
#139. July	Olivia Wilde
#140. August	Joanna Krupa
#141. September	Milla Jovovich
#142. October	Audrina Patridge
#143. November	Tricia Helfer & Grace Park
#144. December	Ashley Greene

== 2010 ==
Issue	Cover star
#145. January	Olivia Munn
#146. February	Amanda Bynes
#147. March	Kaley Cuoco
#148. April	Alice Eve
#149. May	Arianny Celeste
#150. June	Selita Ebanks
#151. July	Nicole Scherzinger
#152. August	Dania Ramirez
#153. September	Lindsay Lohan
#154. October	Anna Kournikova
#155. November	Avril Lavigne
#156. December	Cobie Smulders

== 2011 ==
Issue	Cover star
#157. January	Katy Perry
#158. February	Olivia Munn
#159. March	Michelle Trachtenberg
#160. April	Brittany Snow
#161. May	Jordana Brewster
#162. June	Cameron Diaz
#163. July	Rosie Huntington-Whiteley
#164. August	Rachel Nichols
#165. September	Lake Bell
#166. October	Yvonne Strahovski
#167. November	Jessica Gomes
#168. December	Kelly Kelly

== 2012 ==
Issue	Cover star
#169. January	JWoww
#170. February	Katrina Bowden
#171. March	Dominique Storelli
#172. April	Jennifer Love Hewitt
#173. May	Malin Åkerman
#174. June	Adrianne Palicki
#175. July & August	Jessica Biel, Kate Beckinsale & Colin Farrell
#176. September	Bar Refaeli
#177. October	Sarah Shahi
#178. November	Bérénice Marlohe
#179. December	Arianny Celeste

== 2013 ==
Issue	Cover star
#180. January & February	Katrina Bowden
#181. March	Elisha Cuthbert
#182. April	Danielle Fishel
#183. May	Ashley Tisdale
#184. June	Heather Graham
#185. July & August	Alyssa Milano
#186. September	Ronda Rousey
#187. October	Christina Aguilera
#188. November	Lacey Chabert
#189. December	Paulina Gretzky

== 2014 ==
Issue	Cover star
#190. January & February	Eva Longoria
#191. March	Laura Vandervoort
#192. April	Sophia Bush
#193. May	Brittney Alger, Brittney Glaze, Dessie Mitcheson, Mayra Tinajero, & Shannon Ihrke
#194. June	Egle Tvirbutaite
#195. July & August	Irina Shayk
#196. September	Jessica Alba
#197. October	Angela Lindvall
#198. November	Bregje Heinen
#199. December & January'15	Lana Del Rey

== 2015 ==
Issue	Cover star
#200. February	Shay Mitchell
#201. March	Candice Swanepoel
#202. April	Lily Aldridge
#203. May	Charli XCX
#204. June & July	Taylor Swift
#205. August	Emily DiDonato
#206. September	Idris Elba (Note: Idris Elba became the first man to appear on the cover of Maxim.)
#207. October	Isabeli Fontana
#208. November	Léa Seydoux
#209. December & January'16	Alessandra Ambrosio

== 2016 ==
Issue	Cover star
#210. February	Elsa Hosk
#211. March	Hannah Davis
#212. April	Ashley Graham
#213. May	Sara Sampaio
#214. June & July	Stella Maxwell
#215. August	Aline Weber
#216. September	Anne Vyalitsyna
#217. October	Romee Strijd
#218. November	Hannah Ferguson
#219. December	Barbara Palvin

== 2017 ==
Issue	Cover star
#220. February	Jasmine Tookes
#221. March	Nina Agdal
#222. April	Bojana Krsmanovic
#223. May	Lana Zakocela
#224. June & July	Hailey Baldwin
#225. August	Alexis Ren
#226. September	Bregje Heinen
#227. October	Devon Windsor
#228. November	Jade Lagardere
#229. December	Martha Hunt

== 2018 ==
Issue	Cover star
#230. January & February	Olivia Burns
#231. March & April	Alanna Arrington
#232. May & June	Heidi Klum
#233. July & August	Kate Upton
#234. September & October	Lais Ribeiro
#235. November & December	Chase Carter

== 2019 ==
Issue	Cover star
#236. January & February	Janel Tanna
#237. March & April	Georgia Fowler
#238. May & June	Shanina Shaik
#239. July & August	Olivia Culpo
#240. September & October	Vita Sidorkina
#241. November & December	Jasmine Sanders

== 2020 ==
Issue	Cover star
#242. January & February	Elizabeth Nguyen
#243. March & April	Kate Bock
#244. May & June	Lorena Rae
#245. July & August	Saweetie
#246. September & October	Marilhéa Peillard
#247. November & December	Lena Simonne

== 2021 ==
Issue	Cover star
#248. January & February	Jessica Carter
#249. March & April	Filippa Hamilton
#250. May & June	Maggie Rawlins
#251. July & August	Teyana Taylor
#252. September & October	Josephine Skriver
#253. November & December	Cindy Kimberly

== 2022 ==
Issue	Cover star
#254. January & February	La-Tanya Greene
#255. March & April	Tanya Kizko
#256. May & June	Daniela Botero
#257. July & August	Paige Spiranac
#258. September & October	Gizele Oliveira
#259. November & December	Ava Max

== 2023 ==
Issue	Cover star
#260. March & April	Gracie Hunt
#261. May & June	Ashley Graham
#262. July & August	Justina Valentine
#263. September	R'Bonney Gabriel

== 2024 ==
Issue	Cover star
#263. March	Maura Higgins
