= Selah Marley =

American model (born 1998)

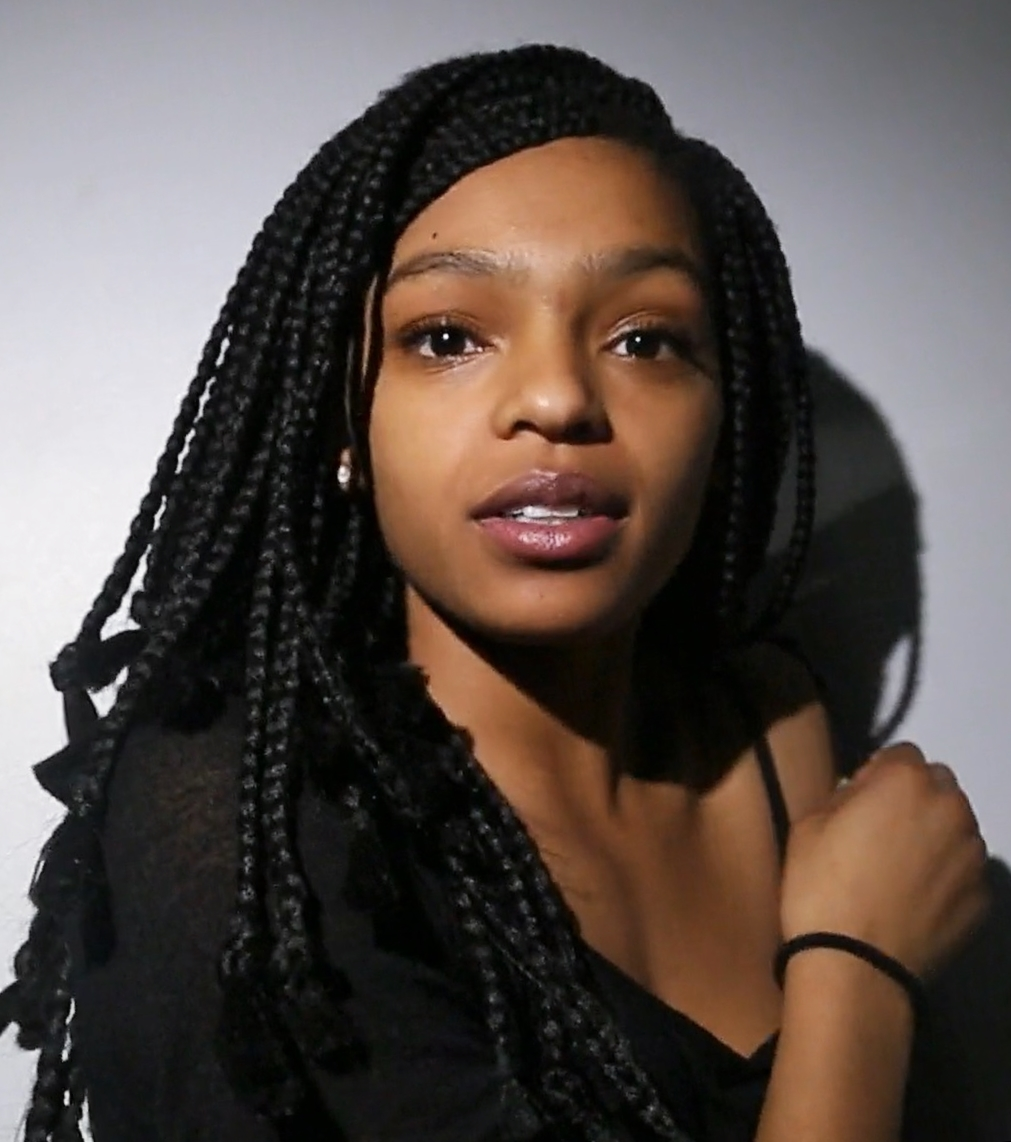
- Marley in 2018
- Born: Selah Louise Marley; November 12, 1998 (age 27); Miami, Florida, U.S.
- Education: New York University
- Occupations: Model; singer
- Years active: 2011–present
- Agent: Next Management
- Height: 1.6 m (5 ft 3 in)
- Parents: Lauryn Hill; Rohan Marley
- Relatives: Bob Marley (grandfather); Nico Marley (half-brother); YG Marley (brother); Ziggy Marley (uncle); Stephen Marley (uncle); Skip Marley (cousin); Isaiah Hill (cousin); Donisha Prendergast (cousin)

Selah Louise Marley (born November 12, 1998) is an American model and singer. She is the daughter of musician Lauryn Hill and former football player Rohan Marley and a granddaughter of late reggae musician Bob Marley. She has walked the runway for Chanel and served as a brand ambassador for the Chanel Chance fragrance. Marley has starred in campaigns for Dior Beauty, Calvin Klein, Telfar and Michael Kors, as well as Beyoncé's Ivy Park, Kanye West's Yeezy and Rihanna's Fenty Beauty. She also acted as a muse for photographer Petra Collins, and has been the subject of artwork by painter Will Cotton.

Along with being featured in campaigns with Alton Mason, Sabrina Carpenter, and Lucky Blue Smith, Marley has appeared on the cover of several magazines. In 2017, she was named to the Maxim Hot 100 list.

== Early life ==
Marley was born to American singer Lauryn Hill and Jamaican entrepreneur Rohan Marley, who never legally married but had a long-term partnership for 15 years. She is the granddaughter of reggae icon Bob Marley. The name Selah is Hebrew, meaning "meditational pause". Marley has numerous siblings and half-siblings between her parents. The most recent addition is through her father's marriage to Brazilian model Barbara Fialho. Marley says that her childhood was complex and traumatic at times.

Born in Miami and raised in South Orange, New Jersey, Marley attended Columbia High School in Maplewood, New Jersey.

As of 2017, Marley was a student of New York University's Gallatin School of Individualized Study, concentrating on science, comparative religion, and philosophy.

== Modeling career ==
Marley started modeling in 2011, when she was featured in Teen Vogue. Since then, she has appeared in Vogue, CR Fashion Book, Dazed, Elle, Harper's Bazaar, L'Officiel, Love, Vanity Fair, V, and Vogue Arabia among others. Marley has been featured on the covers of Wonderland, Flaunt, UK Sunday Times, and L'Uomo Vogue. She has also walked the runway for Chanel, Calvin Klein, Telfar, Pyer Moss, and Kanye West's Yeezy line. The New York Times named her one of "Fashion's New 'it' Kids" in 2016. She was also named on Dazed's "Dazed 100" list.

In 2017, she was included in a sneaker campaign alongside Sabrina Carpenter and Rowan Blanchard for Converse. That same year, she was also featured in a campaign for Michael Kors, and Beyoncé's Ivy Park line. Rihanna included Marley in a campaign for her Fenty Beauty brand. Marley simultaneously appeared on the cover of 10 Magazine, and was photographed in a spread alongside Alton Mason. She was also placed on the Maxim Hot 100 list.

In 2018, Marley fronted the Chanel campaign for their Chance fragrance. That same year she was featured in a campaign for Telfar, and starred in a campaign alongside Lucky Blue Smith for Armani Exchange and Fossil Group. Marley also acted as a muse for Dior Beauty.

On October 3, 2022, Marley received backlash on social media after participating in Kanye West's Yeezy Season 9 fashion show in Paris, during which she modeled a shirt with the slogan "White Lives Matter." Marley defended her decision to wear the apparel, claiming people are in a "hive mind mentality" and that she did not do so without intention or prior thought.

== Artistic work ==
In addition to modeling, Marley has been featured as a muse for several artists, including Petra Collins, who frequently includes her photography and considered Marley to be a muse. In 2017, Marley was the subject of a candy-themed installation at the Mary Boone Gallery in New York, in collaboration with American painter Will Cotton. In 2019, Marley debuted an immersive art installation, A Primordial Place, in New York. The exhibit featured a plant-filled environment inspired by nature and spirituality. That same year, she was listed as a participating artist and Studio Party Benefit Committee member for the Whitney Museum of American Art's Gala.

== Discography ==
=== EP ===
- 2021 – "Star Power"

=== Single ===
- 2017 – "Wait" Nikosi (Featuring Selah Marley)
- 2019 – "500 Days"
- 2021 – "S.A.D"
- 2021 – "24HRS"
- 2022 – "Safety"
- 2022 – "Bottled" (with the Loyalties)
- 2022 – "NYFU"
- 2022 – "Shekinah Freedom"
- 2022 – "Here to Stay"
- 2022 – "Genesis"

== Filmography ==
Year	Title	Role	Notes
2018	Pyer Moss: Spring/Summer 2019 at NYFW	Herself	Video short film
2018	Eckhaus Latta: Spring/Summer 2019 at NYFW	Herself	Video short film
2018	Chanel: Chance	Herself	Video short film
