= Zuri =

Zuri may refer to:

- Zuri, Africa, a former Roman city and bishopric in Africa Proconsularis, now in Aïn-Djour, Tunisia, and a Latin Catholic titular see
- Züri, a name of Zürich city, Switzerland
- Zuri (comics), a Marvel Comics character associated with Black Panther
- Zuri Hall (born 1988), American television host
- Zuri Lawrence (born 1970), American boxer
- Zuri Tibby (born 1995), American fashion model
- Zuri, a frazione of the comune of Ghilarza, Sardinia, Italy
- Zuri (given name)
- Žirje, Croatia, an island in the Adriatic Sea known to the Italians as Zuri
