= Devon Windsor =

American model (born 1994)

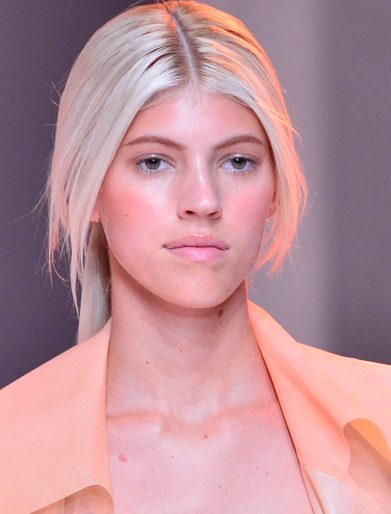
- Windsor in November 2014
- Born: Devon Elizabeth Windsor; March 7, 1994 (age 32); St. Louis, Missouri, U.S.
- Occupation: Model
- Years active: 2008–present
- Known for: Victoria's Secret Fashion Show (2013, 2014, 2015, 2016, 2017, 2018)
- Spouse: Jonathan Barbara (m. 2019)
- Children: 2
- Modeling information
- Height: 1.80 m (5 ft 11 in)
- Hair color: Blonde
- Eye color: Hazel
- Agency: Next Management (London); West Model Management (St. Louis)
- Website: devonwindsor.com

Devon Elizabeth Windsor (born March 7, 1994) is an American fashion model, best known for her work with Victoria's Secret, having walked in their annual fashion show from 2013 to 2018.

Born and raised in St. Louis, Missouri, Windsor began her modeling career at the age of 14 after being discovered by a local photographer. She gained prominence in the fashion industry after signing with IMG Models and walking for high-profile designers such as Prada, Chanel, and Versace. Windsor has appeared in numerous international editions of Vogue, Elle, and Harper's Bazaar, and has been featured in campaigns for brands like Michael Kors, Balmain, and H&M.

In 2019, she launched her own swimwear line, Devon Windso. Outside of modeling, Windsor has ventured into television, appearing on shows like Model Squad and Master Chef Celebrity Showdown, and made her film debut in Brawl in Cell Block 99 (2017). She married businessman Jonathan Barbara in 2019, and the couple has two children.

== Early life and education ==
Devon Windsor was born and raised in St. Louis, Missouri. She is the daughter of Charles and Lisa Windsor, and has one sister, Alexandra. Windsor attended high school at Mary Institute and St. Louis Country Day School, where she played junior varsity field hockey, lacrosse, and tennis.

== Career ==
=== 2008–2013: Early work ===
Windsor was discovered when she was 14 years old by St. Louis fashion photographer Suzy Gorman. In 2008, Windsor signed with West Model & Talent Management. During high school, her first modeling jobs were for local St. Louis publications and fashion shows. In 2009, she joined a second agency, Vision Model Management, and worked in Los Angeles that summer. In 2010, Windsor signed with IMG Models in New York. After high school graduation in 2012, Windsor moved to Europe and worked with IMG Milan and IMG London. During this time, she worked with magazines, such as Gioia, Bullett, Punkt, and Creem.

=== 2013–2015: Professional rise ===
In 2013, Windsor returned to New York City, where she walked her first fashion week for the Spring/Summer 2014 shows. A career changing moment for Windsor was walking for Prada in September 2013. During fittings, her hair was dyed platinum blonde. which became her signature look. Later that season, Models.com named Windsor as a "Top Newcomer" and included her on their 2013 "Hot List."

From 2013 to 2015, Windsor walked in 132 shows in New York, London, Paris, and Milan including Alexander McQueen, Celine, Chanel, Dior, Emilio Pucci, Jean Paul Gaultier, Stella McCartney, Carolina Herrera, Fendi, Jason Wu, Max Mara, Michael Kors, Moschino, Salvatore Ferragamo, Tom Ford, Versace, Armani, Oscar de la Renta, Topshop, and Balmain.

During this time, Windsor appeared in editorials for Vogue Germany, Vogue Japan, Vogue Russia, Vogue Brazil, Vogue Thailand, Vogue Mexico, Vogue Turkey, Vogue Spain, CR Fashion Book, Harper's Bazaar, Harper's Bazaar Germany, Interview Germany, Numéro, Numero Tokyo, 10 Magazine, V, and Elle Brazil.

She shot her first Vogue cover for Vogue Turkey in 2014, and was also featured on the cover of Vogue Thailand, Elle Brazil, 10 Magazine, Oyster, and Wonderland.

Windsor was featured in advertisements and campaigns for Max Mara Studio, Jean Paul Gaultier, Love Moschino, Pink, Sephora, Michael Kors Fragrance, Nordstrom, Forever 21, and Nexxus.

In November 2013, she made her first appearance in the Victoria's Secret Fashion Show. In December 2014, Windsor made her second appearance in the Victoria's Secret Fashion Show in London where she earned her first pair of wings. In November 2015, she walked the show for a third year.

=== 2016–2017 ===
In 2016, Windsor made her Television debut on MasterChef Celebrity Showdown hosted by Gordon Ramsay. She faced-off with fellow model, Gigi Hadid. The two friends competed against each other to raise money for their favorite charities.

From 2016 to 2017, Windsor appeared in editorials for Vogue Mexico, Vogue Taiwan, Elle U.K., Allure Russia, V Magazine, Harper's Bazaar Kazakhstan, French Revue de Modes, and Narcisse.

Windsor was featured on covers for Allure Russia, Harper's Bazaar Kazakhstan, Maxim, Singles Korea, and Narcisse. In addition to booking the cover, Windsor made Maxim's "Hot 100 List" in both 2016 and 2017.

Windsor's 2016-2017 advertising campaigns included Forever 21, The Frye Company, Amazon Fashion, and was the face of H&M, Express, Inc., and Balmain Hair multiple times.

During this time period she walked for a variety of designers including three Tommy Hilfiger shows, Etam Développement, Zimmermann, and opened for Cushnie et Ochs. In 2016 and 2017, Windsor continued to book consecutive shows for the Victoria's Secret Fashion Show.

In October 2017, Windsor made her film debut with a small role opposite Vince Vaughn in Brawl in Cell Block 99, when she played the role of Jill.

=== 2018–present ===
In January 2018, Windsor made an appearance on the Lifetime show “Making a Model with Yolanda Hadid.”

Windsor starred in her first television series, Model Squad which airs on E! Entertainment.

In 2018, Windsor was featured in campaigns for Aritzia, Lucky Brand Jeans, Moroccanoil, Casadei, Juicy Couture Oui Fragrance, Björn Borg, Elisabetta Franchi, and Zadig et Voltaire.

Windsor was featured in editorials and covers for L'Officiel Argentina, L'Officiel St. Barth, Numéro Tokyo, Elle Bulgaria, and D'Scene and shot editorials for Elle Middle East, Elle Russia, L'Officiel Argentina, Numéro Tokyo, and Vanity Fair Italy.

Windsor has been previously listed on the Models.com Money Girls List. She was also listed on the Maxim "Hot 100 List" for three years in a row.

In summer 2019, Windsor launched her namesake swimwear line, Devon Windsor.

Windsor's campaign and advertising work in 2019 included jobs for Vince Camuto, Ramy Brook, Bloomingdale's, Bulliony, Matalan, Peter Hahn, and Bal Harbour Shops.

In 2019, Windsor was featured on the cover and in editorials for Elle Mexico, Ocean Drive, and Bal Harbour, and was in editorials for Numero Russia and Vogue Taiwan Beauty.

In 2025, Devon Windsor was included in class action lawsuit with two other influencers and Celsius Holdings, an energy drink company for failing to disclose the influencers’ financial relationship with the energy drink brand.

Plaintiff Mariana Dubreu claims Celsius and the influencers—including Devon Barbara—engaged in a scheme to artificially inflate the prices of Celsius products by having the influencers promote the energy drinks without disclosing they were paid to do so. [20]

== Personal life ==
Windsor has been known for her interest in food and cooking. She regularly shares her tips for fitness, beauty routines and recipes via interviews, social media, and her vlog on YouTube.

Windsor announced her engagement to businessman Jonathan Barbara on June 24, 2018, and was married on November 16, 2019, on the island of Saint Barts. She gave birth to their first child, a girl, on September 8, 2021. On November 21, 2022, she announced that they were expecting their second child. They announced that Barbara and Windsor welcomed their another girl, on May 1, 2023.

== Filmography ==
=== Film ===
| Year | Title | Role | Notes |
|---|---|---|---|
| 2017 | Brawl in Cell Block 99 | Jill | |

=== Television ===
| Year | Title | Notes |
|---|---|---|
| 2013 | Victoria's Secret Fashion Show 2013 | Aired December 10 |
| 2014 | Victoria's Secret Fashion Show 2014 | Aired December 9 |
| 2015 | Victoria's Secret Fashion Show 2015 | Aired December 8 |
| 2016 | MasterChef Celebrity Showdown | Episode dated January 18 |
| 2016 | Victoria's Secret Fashion Show 2016 | Aired December 5 |
| 2017 | Hell's Kitchen | Guest Diner, Episode dated November 10 |
| 2017 | Victoria's Secret Fashion Show 2017 | Aired November 28 |
| 2018 | Making a Model with Yolanda Hadid | Episode dated January 18 |
| 2018 | Model Squad | Premiere date September 4, 8 episodes |
| 2018 | Victoria's Secret Fashion Show 2018 | Aired December 2 |

== See also ==
- Natasha Oakley, Instagram swimwear model
