= Bridget Malcolm =

Australian model (born 1991)

- Born: 3 November 1991 (age 35); Western Australia, Australia
- Occupation: Model
- Years active: 2007–present
- Known for: VS Fashion Show 2015 VS Fashion Show 2016
- Spouse: Nathaniel Hoho (m. 2016)
- Modeling information
- Height: 1.79 m (5 ft 10 1/2 in)
- Hair color: Blonde
- Eye color: Blue
- Agency: Women Management (New York); Elite Model Management (Milan, London, Copenhagen); Oui Management (Paris); Modelwerk (Hamburg); Chadwick Models (Sydney); NEW Scouting & Management (Queens)

Bridget Malcolm (born 3 November 1991) is an Australian model who is known for appearing in Victoria's Secret Fashion shows in addition to walking in other fashion shows such as Ralph Lauren and Stella McCartney. Besides shows, Malcolm has also appeared in magazines such as Harper's Bazaar, Playboy and Elle.

She went on to publicly disparage the damage that she says happens to models in the industry, particularly within Victoria's Secret.

== Early life ==
Bridget Malcolm was a student at Methodist Ladies' College, Perth.

In October 2007, she was picked out of the crowd to take part in the Viviens model search. She finished third. Right after that, she posed for the magazine Harper's Bazaar twice as well as Jodhi Meares's swimwear brand Tigerlily.

== Career ==
In June 2011, she posed in an editorial for Madison. In October, she covered WWD Beauty Inc. During the autumn/winter season, she walked for David Jones.

In September 2013, she walked the runway for Peter Som, Kenneth Cole, Tibi, Band of Outsiders, Rodarte, Ralph Lauren and Hache. In January 2014, she walked the Ralph Lauren and Stella McCartney Pre Fall fashion shows. In February, she walked for Polo Ralph Lauren. In July, she covered V. In September, she walked for Ryan Roche and Polo Ralph Lauren.

In January 2015, she was featured in an editorial for Elle. In February, she posed for Models.com and walked the runway for Polo Ralph Lauren, Issa, Topshop Unique. In April, she posed for an editorial for Harper's Bazaar Mexico and Latin America and the following month for the Spain and Netherlands editions of the magazine; in July she posed again for the Netherlands edition. In August, she walked the runway for David Jones. In September, she was featured on the Italian Elle and walked for Polo Ralph Lauren. In October, she posed for Harper's Bazaar Australia. In November, she was featured on magazines Elle Australia and Harper's Bazaar Greece and walked the Victoria's Secret Fashion Show for their PINK Segment. In the past, she had been rejected twice by the lingerie brand. She walked once again in 2016. She was the Playboy Playmate of the Month for January 2017, her pictorial shot by Jason Lee Perry.

In 2018, Malcolm revealed that she was body shamed during a previous photo shoot.

In 2020, after two years of intensive therapy, she began a podcast with Dr. Allie Sharma, called Model Mentality, to address mental illness such as eating disorders that are present within the fashion industry. She also completed an internship in international communications at the United Nations in New York.

== Criticism of the industry ==
Malcolm went on to do interviews, both in print and on Australian 60 Minutes, in which she criticized the culture at Victoria's Secret. Malcolm said that she had been groomed while underage, sexually assaulted and bullied, which led to eating disorders, physical and mental lack of health and emotional issues, including suicide ideation. She underwent years of therapy afterward. Malcolm says that the stress she went through at Victoria's Secret was common among the models while she was there.

== Personal life ==
When Malcolm was younger, she practiced ballet for 13 years. She is also a classically trained musician, having studied oboe at the Western Australian Academy of Performing Arts (WAAPA).

She practices meditation.

In 2016, Malcolm married American musician Nathaniel Hoho in Pennsylvania.

In 2018, Malcolm made a public apology relating to body dysmorphic disorder on Instagram, after publicising the unhealthy diet and exercise regimes she had followed.
