= Sidorkin =

Sidorkin (Russian: Сидоркин) is a Russian masculine surname, its feminine counterpart is Sidorkina. Notable people with the surname include:

- Vita Sidorkina (born 1994), Russian model
- Vladimir Sidorkin (born 1986), Estonian swimmer
