= Bruna Lirio =

Brazilian model (born 1994)

- Born: September 11, 1994 (age 31); Vitoria, Espírito Santo, Brazil
- Occupation: Model
- Known for: Victoria's Secret Fashion Show
- Modelling information
- Height: 1.78 m (5 ft 10 in)
- Hair colour: Brown
- Eye colour: Green
- Agency: Marilyn Agency (Paris) Why Not Model Management (Milan)

Bruna Lirio (born September 11, 1994) is a Brazilian model, best known for her work as a Victoria's Secret model.

== Career ==
Bruna was recruited in 2013 in her hometown of Vitoria, Brazil and signed with Mc2 Models Miami. She later signed with Wilhelmina Models New York. Bruna Lirio has appeared in the Victoria's Secret Fashion Show twice, in 2015 and 2017.

Lirio has walked for many fashion brands & high fashion designers, including Area, John Paul Ataker, Lela Rose, Jenny Packham, Christian Siriano, Cushnie et Ochs, Tadashi Shoji and more.

She has appeared in an editorial for Harper's Bazaar Bulgaria shot by Stefan Imielski.
