= Model Squad =

- Genre: Docu-series
- Starring: Daniela Braga; Olivia Culpo; Hannah Ferguson; Ping Hue; Nadine Leopold; Caroline Lowe; Ashley Moore; Shanina Shaik; Devon Windsor
- Country of origin: United States
- Original language: English
- No. of seasons: 1
- No. of episodes: 8

Production
- Camera setup: Multiple
- Running time: 41–48 minutes
- Production companies: Tropper Entertainment; IMG Original Content; Lionsgate Television

Original release
- Network: E!
- Release: September 4 – September 14, 2018

Model Squad is an American docu-series on E!. A New York Fashion Week-themed preview episode aired on February 12, 2018. It premiered on September 4, 2018.

== Premise ==
The show follows models and influencers in the fashion world.

== Cast ==
=== Main ===
- Daniela Braga - Brazilian fashion model best known for her work with Victoria's Secret and Balmain
- Olivia Culpo - fashion influencer, Miss Universe 2012
- Hannah Ferguson - American model best known for her work with Sports Illustrated Swimsuit Issue
- Ping Hue - Chinese-American model
- Nadine Leopold - Austrian model best known for her work with Victoria's Secret.
- Caroline Lowe - American model and actress
- Ashley Moore - American model
- Shanina Shaik - Australian fashion model best known for her work with Victoria's Secret.
- Devon Windsor - American model best known for her work with Victoria's Secret.

== Episodes ==
No.	Title	Original release date	U.S. viewers (millions)
1	"Work Hard, Play Hard"	September 4, 2018	N/A
New York Fashion Week begins and most of the girls are preparing for the Victoria's Secret Fashion Show casting. They take a trip to The Hamptons.
2	"New York, New You"	September 5, 2018	N/A
North Carolina-born model Ashley Moore moves to New York to launch her career. Caroline Lowe gets serious with her boyfriend. Olivia Culpo's poor casting experience may jeopardize her dream of being in the Sports Illustrated Swimsuit Issue by Yu Tsai.
3	"The Front Row"	September 6, 2018	N/A
Devon wants to branch out into acting while Olivia wants to be on the runway, despite her height. Ping is experiencing career setbacks due to the industry's preference for girl's as young as they can be.
4	"Tie the Knot... Not!"	September 10, 2018	N/A
Caroline goes with her boyfriend to visit his family in Mississippi where the pressure is put on them to get married. Ashley gets much-needed career advice. Daniela invites Nadine into the VS model circle.
5	"Brother-in-Law"	September 11, 2018	N/A
Caroline's boyfriend Heath plans a big romantic gesture. Olivia goes to her home state.
6	"Headed for a Breakdown"	September 12, 2018	N/A
7	"Adulting"	September 13, 2018	N/A
8	"Miami Nice"	September 14, 2018	N/A
