= Natasha Oakley =

Australian Instagram model (born 1990)

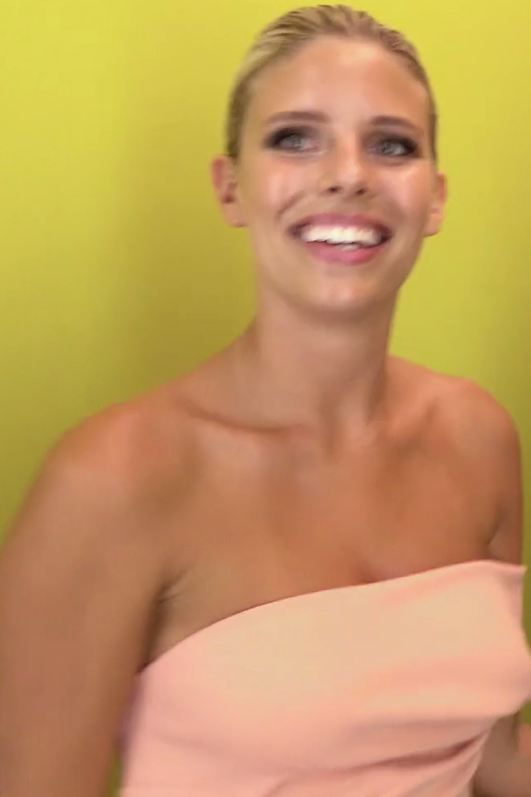
- Oakley in 2016
- Born: 14 July 1990 (age 36); Bronte, New South Wales, Australia
- Occupations: Entrepreneur, model
- Years active: 2010–present
- Known for: A Bikini A Day Instagram blog; Monday Swimwear brand

Natasha Oakley (born 14 July 1990) is an Australian Instagram model. She came to prominence with her A Bikini A Day blog, which she founded with friend and business partner Devin Brugman in 2012. Oakley and Brugman went on to launch the retail brand "Monday Swimwear" in 2014.

== Early life ==
Oakley was born and raised in the eastern suburbs of Sydney, Australia. She grew up with her mother and lived in Miami with her mother for three years from age 10 and spent two years in Maui, where she met business partner Brugman in 2009, before relocating to Los Angeles to launch her production company, Datreats Productions.

== Career ==
=== Businesses ===
In 2012, aged 22, Oakley and her business partner Brugman founded A Bikini A Day as a lifestyle blog that posted a photo of them in a new swimsuit each day. Oakley told the Australian Financial Review "We immediately started getting inquiries through social media of how to get featured on our page. So I drew up the terms and conditions, and we were charging $100 a post to be featured on the page".

After gathering a large online following, in 2014, Oakley and Brugman launched their own swimwear brand, Monday Swimwear. New collections are released biannually utilizing a direct-to-consumer e-commerce model. The brand is known for eschewing logos and seasonal trends, instead of centering its designs around flattering fits and showcasing healthy rather than overly thin models. The brand later expanded into beachwear, and in 2017 was named one of the top seven US swimwear brands for women by the Evening Standard. In 2017, Oakley was listed in the US's top athleisure clothing designers by Glamour. As well as producing their clothing lines, the pair have also designed product collaborations with international brands, including Guess, Missguided UK, BikBok, and Wildfox. They have also partnered brands such as Tory Burch, Vix Swimwear, and Beach Riot.

In 2022, Elle magazine noted that Oakley's businesses had been estimated at over $63 million, and was listed on Australian Financial Review's 2021 Young Rich List.

=== Partnerships ===
Oakley has personally partnered with brands as an ambassador, including American Express Platinum, La Mer, Seafolly Australia, St. Tropez Tan, and Carolina Herrera.

=== Media ===
Oakley has been featured on the cover of international magazines, including Cosmopolitan Australia, Cosmopolitan Finland, Women’s Health UK, Women’s Health Germany, Collective Hub, Arcadia Magazine, and Women’s Health Fitness Magazine. Natasha also appeared on 60 Minutes with Peter Stefanovic in August 2017.

== Personal life ==
Oakley's mother Lynette Laming was a model including the hostess on the popular television show “Catch us if you can” and whilst representing Australia was in the final 12 of Miss Intercontinental in 1980 held on the Island of Aruba in the Caribbean and Venezuela. Lynette received the title of Miss Photogenic at that Pageant.ref. Australian beauties.blospots.com Her mother is a successful and entrepreneurial property agent, who started her own office Laming Property at 21 years of age in Sydney, Australia and has held major roles in some of Australia’s largest property companies. Frasers Property, C21..(LinkedIn) Natasha was raised by her mother in Sydney’s eastern suburbs and the USA. Her father Guy was an Australian Ironman and a policeman, who then became a Private Investigator for Laming Law. She has an older sister called Samantha (36) and a younger half-sister, Sophia, through her mother. In July 2022, she became engaged to Theo Chambers. They were married in Capri, Italy in August 2023.

== See also ==
- Devon Windsor, Instagram swimwear model
- Camille Kostek, Instagram swimwear model
