= Rohan Marley =

Son of Bob Marley (born 1972)

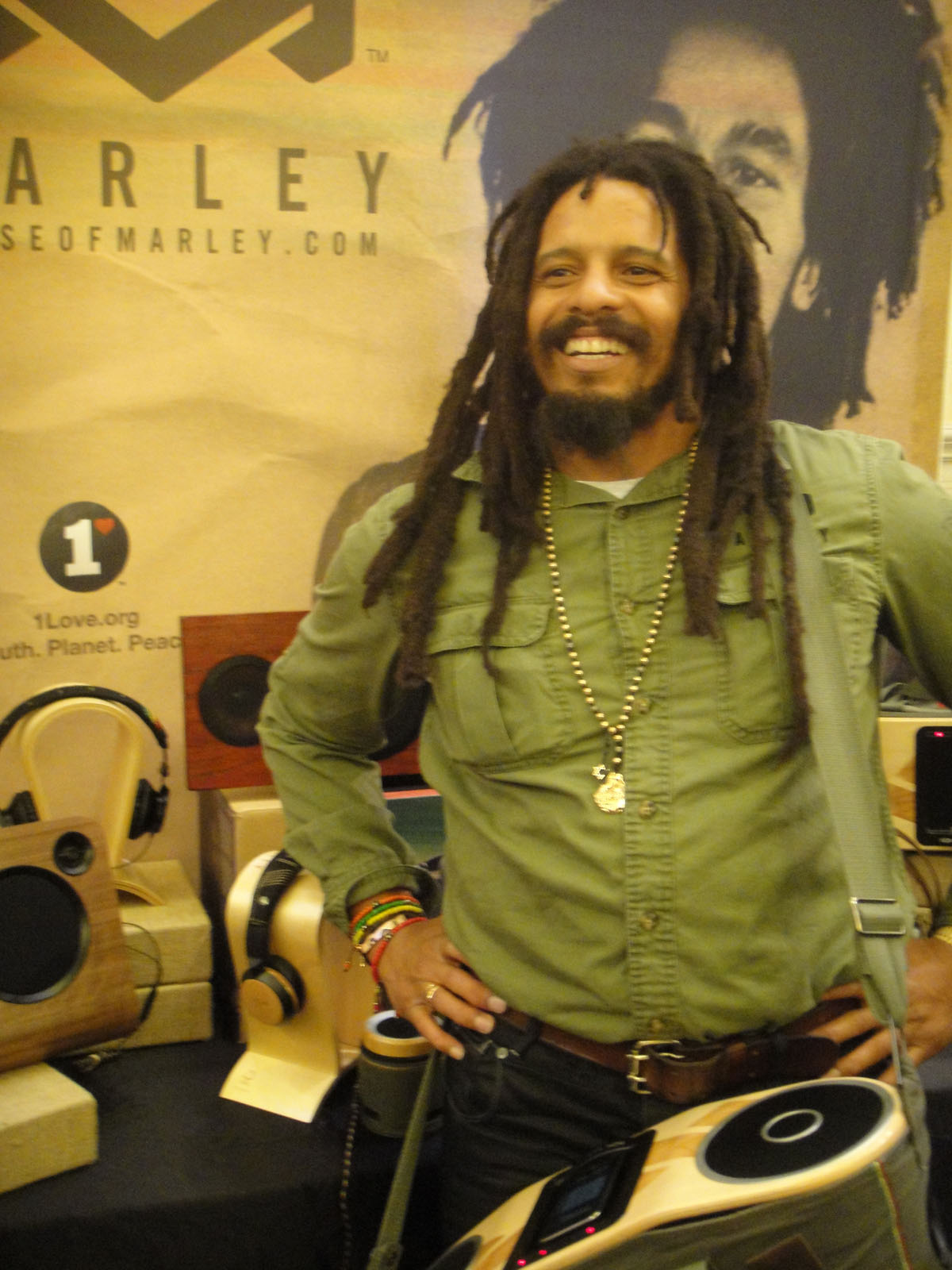
- Marley in 2012
- Born: Rohan Anthony Marley; 19 May 1972 (age 54); Kingston, Jamaica
- Occupations: Businessman; former football player
- Spouses: Geraldine Khawly (m. 1993; div. 1996) Barbara Fialho (m. 2019; div. 2020)
- Partners: Lauryn Hill (1996–2009); Maytee Martinez (2024–present; engaged)
- Children: 12, including Nico, Selah & YG
- Father: Bob Marley
- Relatives: Sharon Marley (half-sister); Cedella Marley (half-sister); Ziggy Marley (half-brother); Stephen Marley (half-brother); Julian Marley (half-brother); Ky-Mani Marley (half-brother); Damian Marley (half-brother); Bambaata Marley (half-nephew); Jo Mersa Marley (half-nephew); Skip Marley (half-nephew); Donisha Prendergast (half-niece); Olivier Vernon (son-in-law)
- Website: rohanmarley.com marleycoffee.com houseofmarley.com

Rohan Anthony Marley (born 19 May 1972) is a Jamaican businessman and former football player. He is the son of reggae artist Bob Marley, and the father of model Selah Marley, reggae artist YG Marley, and former American football player Nico Marley.

== Early life and education ==
Rohan was born in Kingston, Jamaica, on 19 May 1972. He was born out of wedlock from an affair that his father had with sixteen-year-old Janet Hunt during his marriage to singer Rita Marley. Rohan Marley went to live with his mother Janet on and off from the age of four until moving to live with his paternal grandmother Cedella Booker after his father died of cancer in Miami in 1981.

He attended Miami Palmetto Senior High School in Pinecrest, Florida, where he graduated in 1991. He then attended the University of Miami School of Business at the University of Miami in Coral Gables, Florida, where he played linebacker for the University of Miami football team. In the 1993 season, Marley led the Hurricanes' defense with 95 tackles.

== Career ==
After his college football career at the University of Miami, Marley entered the Canadian Football League, where he played seven games for the Ottawa Rough Riders during the 1995 season.

In 2009, he co-founded Marley Coffee, an organic coffee plantation and sustainable farming business in Jamaica's Blue Mountains, although the majority of coffee sourced through Marley Coffee is from Ethiopia. The business is run on a 52-acre estate in Portland Parish. In 2011, Marley Coffee went public under the name Jammin Java (OTC:JAMN).

In January 2011, Marley advertised a new 'House of Marley' range of eco-friendly headphones at the Consumer Electronics Show in Las Vegas, Nevada. The range has since expanded and now produces headphones and speakers as well as turntables.

Marley also helps run his family's charitable organization, 1Love, as well as the Tuff Gong clothing company.

== In popular culture ==
He made an appearance in the 2010 documentary film Motherland.

== Personal life ==
On 18 March 1993, as a sophomore at the University of Miami, Marley married his girlfriend Geraldine Khawly. They had a daughter and a son, Nico Marley, who was a linebacker at Tulane and was signed by the Washington Redskins in 2017.

Marley met musician Lauryn Hill in 1996, and they had five children including model Selah Marley and singer songwriter Joshua Omaru, known professionally as YG Marley. Marley and Hill lived apart for most of their relationship, which ended in 2009. Marley provided temporary custody for their five children while Hill served a three-month prison sentence for tax evasion in 2013. While Hill sometimes referred to Marley as her husband, they never legally married.

In 2003, Rolling Stone suggested that Marley had never divorced Khawly. However, in 2011, Marley produced a Haitian divorce decree which demonstrated that he had divorced Khawly in 1996.

In early 2013, Marley was briefly engaged to Isabeli Fontana, but the engagement ended in early 2013.

On 23 March 2019, Marley married Brazilian model Barbara Fialho in Montes Claros, Brazil, five months before the birth of their daughter. Marley divorced Fialho the following year.
