= Zuri (given name) =

Name list

- Gender: unisex

Origin
- Origin: Swahili
- Meaning: "beautiful"

Zuri is a given name of Swahili origin meaning "beautiful." It has been among the 1,000 most popular names for newborn girls in the United States since 2010 and among the top 300 names since 2018. Zuri was among the five most popular names for Black newborn girls in the American state of Virginia in 2022.

== Women ==
- Zuri Hall (born 1988), American entertainment reporter, television personality, actress and producer
- Zuri Tibby (born 1995), American model

== Men ==
- Zuri Lawrence (born 1970), American professional boxer

== In fiction ==
- Zuri the Bunny, an energetic and comedic character in Wonder Pets: In The City
- Zuri, one of the nine default player characters in the game Minecraft
- Zuri Chapman, a character in Camp Half-Blood
- Zuri Ross, one of the four main kids in the TV shows Jessie and Bunk'd
