= Barbara Fialho =

Brazilian model and singer (born 1987)

- Born: 21 December 1987 (age 38); Montes Claros, Minas Gerais, Brazil
- Occupations: Model; singer
- Spouse: Rohan Marley (m. 2019; div. 2020)
- Children: 1
- Modeling information
- Height: 1.83 m (6 ft 0 in)
- Hair color: Brown
- Eye color: Blue/Green
- Agency: Kollektiv Management (New York); Uno Models (Barcelona); Modelwerk (Hamburg)

Barbara Fialho (born 21 December 1987) is a Brazilian model and singer. She signed with the international modeling agency IMG Models in 2011. Fialho then landed her first major modeling opportunity, by starring in a campaign for Just Cavalli. She has since walked the runway for Victoria's Secret multiple times.

== Career ==
=== Modeling ===
At 15 years of age, Barbara Fialho left her home town of Montes Claros and moved to the city of São Paulo to work as a model for São Paulo Fashion Week and Rio Fashion Week. Three months later, she moved to New York City to travel the fashion circuit of NY, Milan and Paris. At 17, she posed for Just Cavalli, photographed by Mario Testino and dressed by Carine Roitfeld.

She signed with IMG Models in 2011. Barbara is now signed with The Lions NY.

She has appeared in editorials for Italian Vogue, American, Italian, Brazilian, and Croatian Elle, American and British Harper's Bazaar, W, Marie Claire, 10 Magazine, Carine Roitfeld's CR Fashion Book, Dossier, Esquire, GQ, L'Officiel, Los Angeles Times, Missbehave, Status, and Vulture. She has appeared on the covers of Italian Vogue, Brazilian Harper's Bazaar, Brazilian and Swedish Elle, and French Numéro,

She has walked the Victoria's Secret Fashion Show in 2012, 2013,2014, 2015, 2016. 2017 and 2018. She has been their fitting model since 2012 and has posed for a few pictures for the brand.

She has walked the runways for Bottega Veneta, Givenchy, Diane Von Furstenberg, Loewe, Christian Dior, House of Holland, Alexander McQueen, John Galliano, Vivienne Westwood, Louis Vuitton, Jeremy Scott, Naeem Khan, Oscar de la Renta, Ralph Rucci, Antonio Berardi, Custo Dalmau, Temperley, Victoria's Secret, and the event Fashion Rocks.

She has appeared in advertising campaigns for Roberto Cavalli, Givenchy, Missoni, Just Cavalli, Diesel, Levi's, Macy's, Amir Slama, El Palacio de Hierro, Meskita, Ugg, and Urban Decay.

She appeared on the James Bond inspired music video of the song "Bright Lights Bigger City" of the American rapper CeeLo Green.

=== Music ===
Barbara Fialho has played guitar since age nine. In 2014, she began studying music at Juilliard School in New York.

In 2014, she recorded a bossa nova album produced by Damon Martin in which she sings every song and plays the guitar in some of them. Her musicians include Abraham Laboriel and Justo Almario. She also released a single in 2017 called Samba e Amor featuring Seu Jorge, to whom she has referred to be one of her favorite musicians.

In 2018, Fialho collaborated with Jo Mersa Marley, to release a single and music video called Um Beijo, this translates to English as “A Kiss”.

== Personal life ==
In 2019, she married Rohan Marley, son of Bob Marley, in her home town of Montes Claros, Brazil. They had a daughter that same year. The couple divorced the following year.
