= Victoria's Secret Fashion Show 2015 =

American lingerie show

- Status: Active
- Genre: Fashion show
- Date: November 10, 2015
- Frequency: Annually
- Venue: 69th Regiment Armory
- Locations: New York City, United States
- Years active: 1995–2003, 2005–2018, 2024–present
- Inaugurated: August 1, 1995
- Most recent: 2026
- Previous event: 2014
- Next event: 2016
- Member: Victoria's Secret
- Website: Victoria's Secret Fashion Show

The Victoria's Secret Fashion Show is an annual fashion show sponsored by Victoria's Secret, a brand of lingerie and sleepwear. Victoria's Secret uses the show to promote and market its goods in high-profile settings. The show features some of the world's leading fashion models, including then current Victoria's Secret Angels Adriana Lima, Alessandra Ambrósio, Behati Prinsloo, Candice Swanepoel, Lily Aldridge, Lais Ribeiro, Elsa Hosk, Jasmine Tookes, Martha Hunt, Sara Sampaio, Stella Maxwell, Taylor Hill, Romee Strijd, Kate Grigorieva, and Jac Jagaciak.

The show featured musical performances by Ellie Goulding, Selena Gomez, and The Weeknd.

Dates	Locations	Broadcaster	Viewers (millions)	Performers
November 10, 2015 (recorded); December 8, 2015	New York City	CBS	6.60	Ellie Goulding, Selena Gomez, and The Weeknd.

== Fashion show segments ==
=== Segment 1: Boho Psychedelic ===
Performer	Song	Status
(United States) Run-DMC	"King of Rock"	Remixed Recording
(United States) Pat Benatar	"Heartbreaker"	Remixed Recording
(United Kingdom) Cream	"I Feel Free"	Remixed Recording
(United States) The Temptations	"Ball of Confusion (That's What the World Is Today)"	Remixed Recording

Nationality	Model	Wings	Runway shows	Status
(Namibia) Namibian	Behati Prinsloo	꒰১ ໒꒱	2007–2015 • 2018 • 2024–present	VS 3 Angel (2009–2019)
(United States) American	Lily Aldridge		2009–2017 • 2025	VS 4 Angel (2010–2018)
(United States) American	Jasmine Tookes	꒰১ ໒꒱	2012–2018 • 2024–present	New VS 5 Angel (2015–2021)
(South Africa) South African	Candice Swanepoel	꒰১ ໒꒱	2007–2015 • 2017–2018 • 2024–present	VS 4 Angel (2010–2021)
(United Kingdom) British	Leomie Anderson		2015–2018	
(United States) American	Kendall Jenner		2015–2016 • 2018	
(United States) American	Martha Hunt	꒰১ ໒꒱	2013–2018	New VS 5 Angel (2015–2019)
(Puerto Rico) Puerto Rican	Joan Smalls		2011–2016 • 2024–present	
(Netherlands) Dutch	Romee Strijd	꒰১ ໒꒱	2014–2018	New VS 5 Angel (2015–2021)
(Angola) Angolan	Maria Borges		2013–2017	
(United States) American	Taylor Hill	꒰১ ໒꒱	2014–2018 • 2024	New VS 5 Angel (2015–2020)
(Denmark) Danish	Josephine Skriver		2013–2018 • 2024	
(Sweden) Swedish	Elsa Hosk		2011–2018 • 2026	New VS 5 Angel (2015–2020)
(Russia) Russian	Kate Grigorieva	꒰১ ໒꒱	2014–2016	New VS 5 Angel (2015–2016)

=== Segment 2: Exotic Butterflies ===
This segment was swapped in order of appearance with the third segment, Portrait of an Angel, for the TV version.

Performer	Song	Status
(United Kingdom) Ellie Goulding	"Army"	Live Performance

Nationality	Model	Wings	Runway shows	Status
(Brazil) Brazilian	Adriana Lima	꒰১ ໒꒱	1999–2003 • 2005–2008 • 2010–2018 • 2024–present	VS 2 Angel (2000–2018)
(United States) American	Gigi Hadid		2015–2016 • 2018 • 2024–present	
(Portugal) Portuguese	Sara Sampaio	꒰১ ໒꒱	2013–2018	New VS 5 Angels (2015–2021)
(Belgium) Belgian	Stella Maxwell	꒰১ ໒꒱	2014–2018 • 2025	New VS 5 Angels (2015–2021)
(France) French	Pauline Hoarau		2015	
(Australia) Australian	Shanina Shaik	꒰১ ໒꒱	2011–2012 • 2014–2015 • 2018	
(Poland) Polish	Jac Jagaciak	꒰১ ໒꒱	2013–2015	New VS 5 Angel (2015–2016)
(Brazil) Brazilian	Daniela Braga	꒰১ ໒꒱	2014–2017	
(China) Chinese	Ming Xi		2013–2018 • 2026	
(Brazil) Brazilian	Barbara Fialho	꒰১ ໒꒱	2012–2018	
(Poland) Polish	Magdalena Frackowiak	꒰১ ໒꒱	2010 • 2012–2015	
(Russia) Russian	Valery Kaufman		2015–2016	
(Brazil) Brazilian	Lais Ribeiro	꒰১ ໒꒱	2010–2011 • 2013–2018	New VS 5 Angel (2015–2021)

=== Segment 3: Portrait of an Angel ===
This segment was swapped in order of appearance with the second segment, Exotic Butterflies, for the TV version.

Performer	Song	Status
(Canada) The Weeknd	"In the Night"	Live Performance

Nationality	Model	Wings	Runway shows	Status
(Brazil) Brazilian	Alessandra Ambrosio	˚₊‧꒰ა ໒꒱ ‧₊˚	2000–2003 • 2005–2017 • 2024–present	VS 2 Angel (2004–2017)
(United Kingdom) British	Lily Donaldson	꒰১ ໒꒱	2010–2016	
(United States) American	Kendall Jenner		2015–2016 • 2018	
(Netherlands) Dutch	Sanne Vloet		2015–2017	
(China) Chinese	Sui He	꒰১ ໒꒱	2011–2018	
(Brazil) Brazilian	Gracie Carvalho		2010 • 2015	
(Brazil) Brazilian	Bruna Lirio		2015 • 2017	
(Russia) Russian	Vita Sidorkina		2015	
(Brazil) Brazilian	Flavia Lucini		2015–2016	
(United States) American	Jacquelyn Jablonski	꒰১ ໒꒱	2010–2015	
(France) French	Cindy Bruna		2013–2018 • 2026	
(Brazil) Brazilian	Izabel Goulart	꒰১ ໒꒱	2005–2016	Former VS 3 Angel (2005–2008)
(France) French	Constance Jablonski	꒰১ ໒꒱	2010–2015	
(United States) American	Jasmine Tookes	꒰১ ໒꒱	2012–2018 • 2024–present	New VS 5 Angel (2015–2021)

=== Segment 4: PINK USA ===
Performer	Song	Status
(United States) Selena Gomez	"Hands to Myself"	Live Performance • Medley
(United States) Selena Gomez	"Me & My Girls"	Live Performance • Medley

Nationality	Model	Wings	Runway shows	Status
(United States) American	Taylor Hill	꒰১ ໒꒱	2014–2018 • 2024	New VS 5 Angel (2015–2020)
(United States) American	Rachel Hilbert	꒰১ ໒꒱	2015–2016	PINK Angel (2015–2017)
(United States) American	Megan Puleri		2015	
(Belgium) Belgian	Yumi Lambert		2014–2015	
(Netherlands) Dutch	Maud Welzen		2012 • 2014–2015	
(China) Chinese	Ming Xi	꒰১ ໒꒱	2013–2018 • 2026	
(Belgium) Belgian	Leila Nda		2015 • 2017	
(Australia) Australian	Bridget Malcolm		2015–2016	
(United States) American	Gigi Hadid		2015–2016 • 2018 • 2024–present	
(Denmark) Danish	Josephine Skriver		2013–2018 • 2024	
(United States) American	Devon Windsor	꒰১ ໒꒱	2013–2018	

=== Segment 5: Ice Angels ===
Song List	Performance	Status
(United Kingdom) Ellie Goulding	"Love Me Like You Do"	Live Performance

Nationality	Model	Wings	Runway shows	Status
(South Africa) South African	Candice Swanepoel	꒰১ ໒꒱	2007–2015 • 2017–2018 • 2024–present	VS 4 Angel (2010–2021)
(Brazil) Brazilian	Lais Ribeiro		2010–2011 • 2013–2018	New VS 5 Angel (2015–2021)
(Angola) Angolan	Sharam Diniz		2012 • 2015	
(Russia) Russian	Kate Grigorieva	꒰১ ໒꒱	2014–2016	New VS 5 Angel (2015–2016)
(Sweden) Swedish	Elsa Hosk	꒰১ ໒꒱	2011–2018 • 2026	New VS 5 Angel (2015–2020)
(Brazil) Brazilian	Barbara Fialho		2012–2018	
(Brazil) Brazilian	Izabel Goulart	꒰১ ໒꒱	2005–2016	Former VS 3 Angel (2005–2008)
(China) Chinese	Sui He	꒰১ ໒꒱	2011–2018	
(United Kingdom) British	Lily Donaldson	꒰১ ໒꒱	2010–2016	
(Belgium) Belgian	Stella Maxwell	꒰১ ໒꒱	2014–2018 • 2025	New VS 5 Angel (2015–2021)
(Poland) Polish	Jac Jagaciak		2013–2015	New VS 5 Angel (2015–2016)
(Netherlands) Dutch	Romee Strijd	꒰১ ໒꒱	2014–2018	New VS 5 Angel (2015–2021)

=== Segment 6: Fireworks ===
Performer	Song	Status
(Canada) The Weeknd	"Can't Feel My Face"	Live Performance

Nationality	Model	Wings	Runway shows	Status	Fantasy Bra + Swarovski Outfit	Value
(United States) American	Lily Aldridge	꒰১ ໒꒱	2009–2017 • 2025	VS 4 Angel (2010–2018)	Fireworks Fantasy Bra by Mouawad	$2,000,000
(Brazil) Brazilian	Alessandra Ambrosio	꒰১ ໒꒱	2000–2003 • 2005–2017 • 2024–present	VS 2 Angel (2004–17)		
(France) French	Cindy Bruna	꒰১ ໒꒱	2013–2018 • 2026			
(Brazil) Brazilian	Adriana Lima	꒰১ ໒꒱	1999–2003 • 2005–2008 • 2010–2018 • 2024–present	VS 2 Angel (2000–2018)		
(Puerto Rico) Puerto Rican	Joan Smalls	꒰১ ໒꒱	2011–2016 • 2024–present			
(Namibia) Namibian	Behati Prinsloo	꒰১ ໒꒱	2007–2015 • 2018 • 2024–present	VS 3 Angel (2009–2019)		
(Angola) Angolan	Maria Borges	꒰১ ໒꒱	2013–2017			
(United States) American	Devon Windsor	꒰১ ໒꒱	2013–2018			
(Portugal) Portuguese	Sara Sampaio	꒰১ ໒꒱	2013–2018	New VS 5 Angel (2015–2021)		
(France) French	Constance Jablonski	꒰১ ໒꒱	2010–2015			
(United States) American	Martha Hunt	˚₊‧꒰ა ໒꒱ ‧₊˚	2013–2018	New VS 5 Angel (2015–2019)	Wonder Woman Swarovski Outfit	–

== Finale ==
Performer	Song	Status
(United States) Børns	"Electric Love"	Remixed Recording

Model	Runway shows	Status	Model	Runway shows	Status
(Namibia) Behati Prinsloo	2007–2015 • 2018 • 2024–present	VS 3 Angel (2009–2019)	(United States) Lily Aldridge	2009–2017 • 2025	VS 4 Angel (2010–2018)
(Brazil) Adriana Lima	1999–2003 • 2005–2008 • 2010–2018 • 2024–present	VS 2 Angel (2000–2018)	(Brazil) Alessandra Ambrosio	2000–2003 • 2005–2017 • 2024–present	VS 2 Angel (2004–2017)
(South Africa) Candice Swanepoel	2007–2015 • 2017–2018 • 2024–present	VS 4 Angel (2010–2021)	(Netherlands) Romee Strijd	2014–2018	New VS 5 Angel (2015–2021)
(Sweden) Elsa Hosk	2011–2018 • 2026	New VS 5 Angels (2015–2020)	(Russia) Kate Grigorieva	2014–2016	New VS 5 Angels (2015–2016)
(Brazil) Lais Ribeiro	2010–2011 • 2013–2018	New VS 5 Angels (2015–2020)	(Poland) Jac Jagaciak	2013–2015	New VS 5 Angels (2015–2016)
(United States) Jasmine Tookes	2012–2018 • 2024–present	New VS 5 Angels (2015–2020)	(Belgium) Stella Maxwell	2014–2018 • 2025	New VS 5 Angels (2015–2021)
(Portugal) Sara Sampaio	2013–2018	New VS 5 Angels (2015–2020)	(United States) Taylor Hill	2014-2018 • 2024	New VS 5 Angels (2015–2021)
(United States) Martha Hunt	2013–2018	New VS 5 Angels (2015–2020)	(United States) Rachel Hilbert	2015–2016	PINK Angel (2015–2017)
(United States) Constance Jablonski	2010–15		(France) Cindy Bruna	2013–2018 • 2026	
(United States) Devon Windsor	2013–2018		(Brazil) Izabel Goulart	2005–2016	Former VS 3 Angel (2005–2008)
(Puerto Rico) Joan Smalls	2011–2016 • 2024–present		(China) Sui He	2011–2018	
(United Kingdom) Lily Donaldson	2010–2016		(Brazil) Barbara Fialho	2012–2018	
(United States) Jacquelyn Jablonski	2010–2015		(Angola) Sharam Diniz	2012 • 2015	
(Angola) Maria Borges	2013–17		(United States) Gigi Hadid	2015–2016 • 2018 • 2024–present	
(Russia) Vita Sidorkina	2015		(Brazil) Flavia Lucini	2015–2016	
(Brazil) Gracie Carvalho	2010 • 2015		(Brazil) Bruna Lirio	2015 • 2017	
(United States) Kendall Jenner	2015–2016 • 2018		(France) Pauline Hoarau	2015	
(Denmark) Josephine Skriver	2013–2018 • 2024		(Netherlands) Sanne Vloet	2015–2017	
(Russia) Valery Kaufman	2015–2016	✿	(Poland) Magdalena Frackowiak	2010 • 2012–2015	
(Australia) Shanina Shaik	2011–2012 • 2014–2015 • 2018		(Brazil) Daniela Braga	2014–2017	
(Australia) Bridget Malcolm	2015–2016	✿	(China) Ming Xi	2013–2018 • 2026	
(Belgium) Leila Nda	2015 • 2017	✿	(Belgium) Yumi Lambert	2014–2015	
(United Kingdom) Leomie Anderson	2015–2018	✿	(Netherlands) Maud Welzen	2012 • 2014–2015	
(United States) Megan Puleri	2015	✿			

== Index ==
Symbol	Meaning
VS 2	2nd Generation Angels
VS 3	3rd Generation Angels
VS 4	4th Generation Angels
VS 5	5th Generation Angels
PINK	PINK Angels
꒰১ ໒꒱	Wings
˚₊‧꒰ა ໒꒱ ‧₊˚	Swarovski Wing
