= Nico Marley =

Haitian-Jamaican American football player (born 1995)

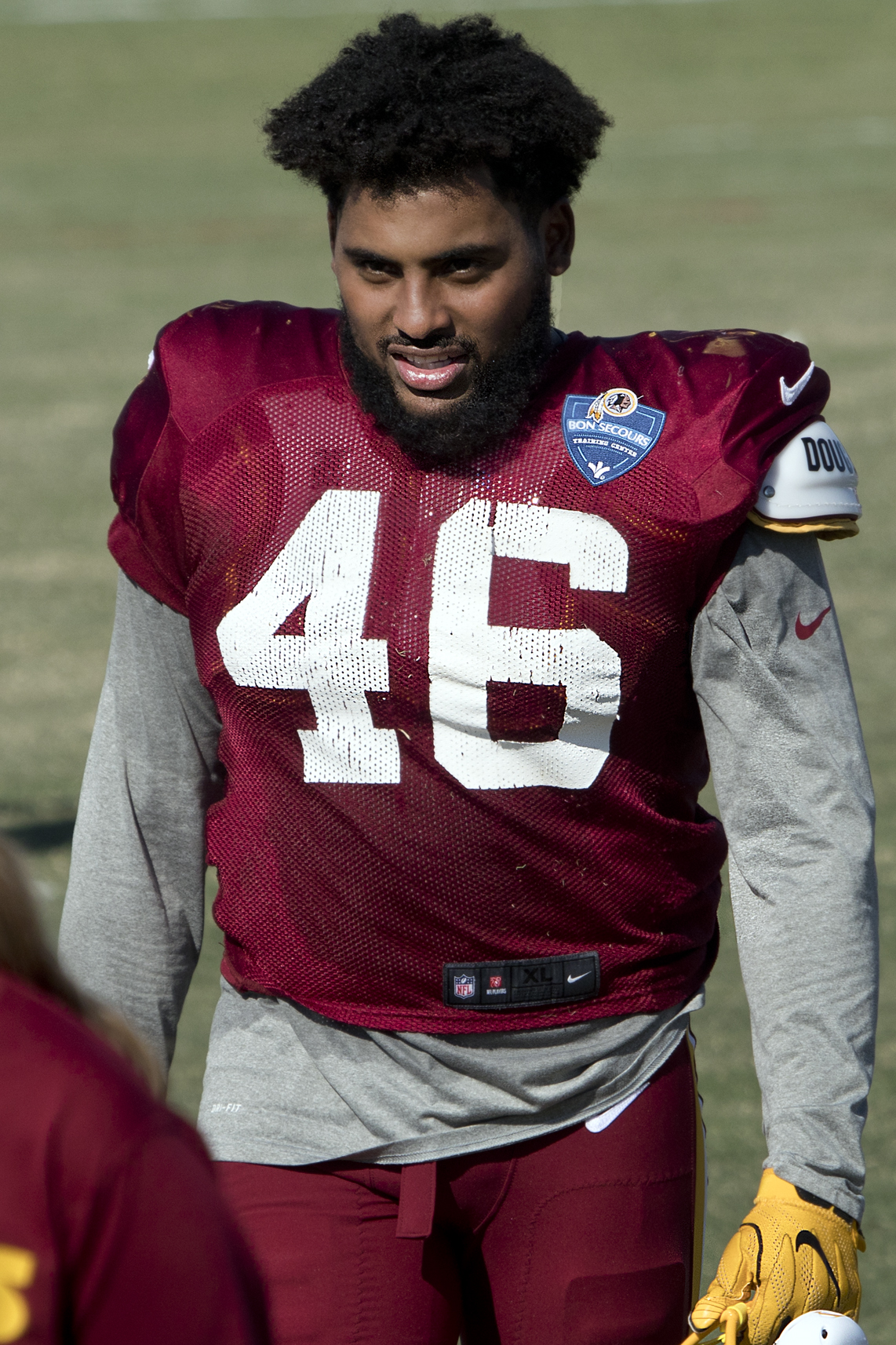
- Marley with the Washington Redskins in 2017

No. 46
- Position: Linebacker

Personal information
- Born: January 5, 1995 (age 31); Haiti
- Listed height: 5 ft 8 in (1.73 m)
- Listed weight: 200 lb (91 kg)

Career information
- High school: Cypress Bay (Weston, Florida)
- College: Tulane
- NFL draft: 2017: undrafted

Career history
- Washington Redskins (2017)*
- * Offseason or practice squad member only
- Stats at Pro Football Reference

Nicolas Rohan "Nico" Marley (born January 5, 1995) is an Haitian-American former linebacker. He played college football at Tulane and was signed by the Washington Redskins as an undrafted free agent in 2017. He is the son of former college football player Rohan Marley and his first wife Geraldine Khawley, grandson of the reggae musician Bob Marley, and half-brother of Selah Marley and YG Marley.

== Early life ==
Marley was born in Haiti and lived in Jamaica for two years before moving to Miami at the age of four. He then later attended Cypress Bay High School in Weston, Florida, where he was named first-team all-state as a senior with 67 tackles. In 2012 he was MVP of the Al Golden Summer Camp. He was rated a three-star college recruit by 247Sports.com and two-star by ESPN, Rivals.com, and Scout.com.

== College career ==
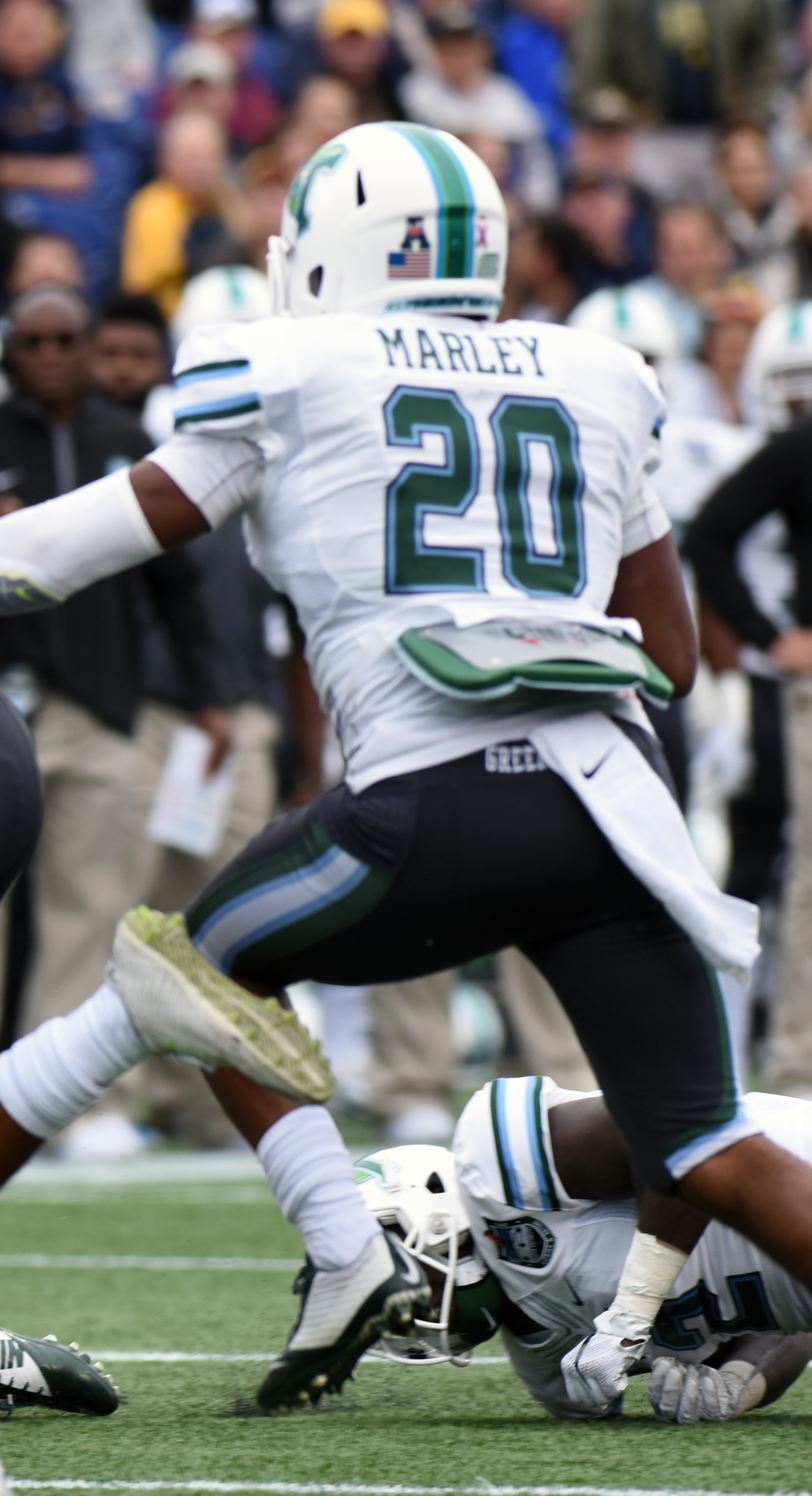
Marley with Tulane in 2015

Marley joined the Tulane Green Wave football team in 2013. It was the only NCAA D-I Football Bowl Subdivision institution to offer him a scholarship, and only two NCAA D-I Football Championship Subdivision institutions did. As a freshman, he was named Conference USA Co-Freshman of the Year and a member of the C-USA All-Freshman Team, with 67 tackles in 13 games. In 2014 he got an All-American Athletic Conference Honorable Mention with 82 tackles in 12 games. In 2015, he was named a member of the All-American Athletic Conference First-team, with 82 tackles in 12 games. In 2016, he was named again a member of the All-American Athletic Conference First-team, with 88 tackles in 12 games. He graduated in business management and marketing.

== Professional career ==
Pre-draft measurables
Height	Weight	Arm length	Hand span	Wingspan	40-yard dash	10-yard split	20-yard split	20-yard shuttle	Three-cone drill	Vertical jump	Broad jump	Bench press
5 ft 7 3/4 in (1.72 m)	195 lb (88 kg)	30 in (0.76 m)	8 1/4 in (0.21 m)	6 ft 1 in (1.85 m)	4.83 s	1.64 s	2.75 s	4.45 s	7.14 s	29.0 in (0.74 m)	9 ft 2 in (2.79 m)	15 reps
All values from Pro Day

On May 16, 2017, Marley signed with the Washington Redskins as an undrafted free agent. He was waived by the Redskins on September 2.
