= Pink (Victoria's Secret) =

Brand of apparel

PINK

- Type: Subsidiary
- Industry: Apparel
- Founded: October 16, 2002; 24 years ago
- Headquarters: Reynoldsburg, Ohio, US
- Number of locations: 141 stores (2020)
- Key people: Ali Dillion (President of PINK)
- Products: Apparel, lingerie
- Parent: Victoria's Secret & Co.
- Website: victoriassecret.com/pink

Pink (stylized PINK) is a lingerie and apparel line by Victoria's Secret targeting younger women than their main line. The target demographic skews younger from teenage girls (13–18) to young adult women through their mid-twenties (18–25). PINK had a regular segment featuring their products in the original Victoria's Secret Fashion Show, held from 1995 to 2018, as well as a segment in the 2025 show. Launched in 2002, sales at the company were initially swift, reaching $1 billion in 2010. Reports of decline due to shifting consumer preferences appeared in 2018.

== History ==
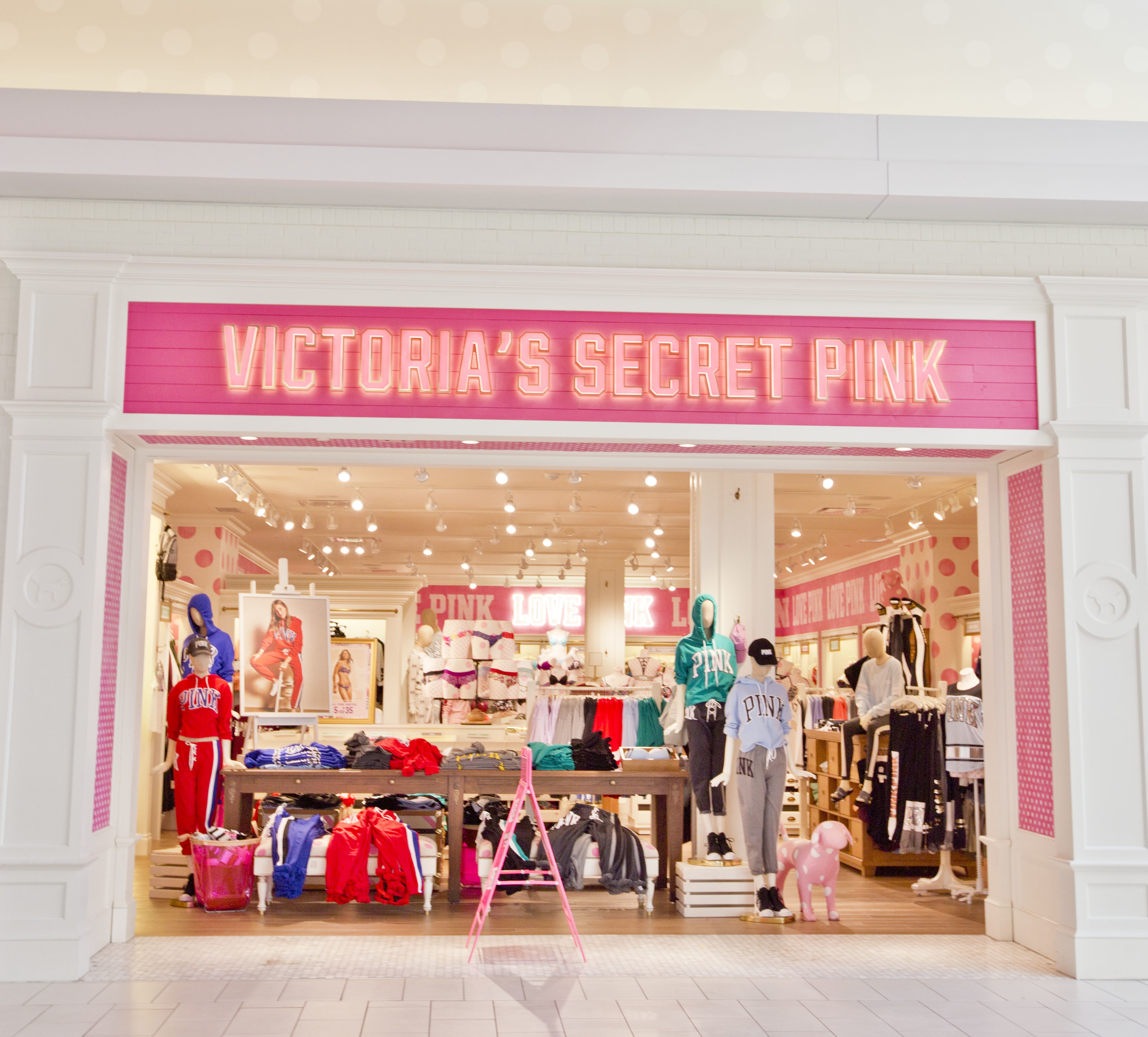
Pink in Vancouver, BC, Canada

On October 16, 2002, Victoria's Secret announced the launch of PINK, a new sub-brand and product line. While originally aimed at "junior" girls, the brand would eventually state its official target demographic is teen girls and college-age women. The product first appeared in late 2003 in select stores, with a full chain-wide roll out in July 2004. The company often placed its stores side-by-side with Victoria's Secret stores.

The PINK brand sells underwear, swimsuits, sleepwear, loungewear, beauty products, and accessories. The brand was launched strategically, to increase and preserve future Victoria's Secret customers (i.e, ages 21+) and market share by building an expanded pipeline of customers whose brand awareness and loyalty are established and cemented up to 10 years earlier, as tweens and teens.

Pink's competition in the lingerie market for the youth demographic includes Abercrombie & Fitch and Aerie by American Eagle. The company's pajamas and sweat pants proved popular within the teenage and preteen set from 2006.

The company grew rapidly in the 2000s, adding stores domestically, and by 2010, sales at PINK reached $1 billion. On November 1, 2009, PINK established its first stand-alone store in Canada, prior to the main Victoria's Secret brand opening its first Canadian store on August 12, 2010.

After working as a leading executive at L Brands and Bath and Body Works, Richard Dent joined the management team at PINK in 2005. He held several key leadership roles at PINK, including the jointly-held responsibilities of COO, SVP, and co-leader of the division. Under Dent's leadership, the brand established a partnership with the National Football League (NFL), Major League Baseball (MLB) and the Collegiate Licensing Company for use of the names and logos of 60 universities in a line of PINK clothing. The Pink "Collegiate Collection" was released in July 2008. Dent expanded the company’s college line in 2009 to include historically black colleges and universities (HBCUs), in response to a campaign by a student at Howard University.

Denise Landman was appointed CEO at PINK in 2011 and served until she retired at the end of 2018. Landman was succeeded by Amy Hauk as CEO in 2019.

The PINK line has been promoted through college tours, and in 2011, the brand continued to work in partnership with NFL teams to market apparel containing team logos to teenage girls and college-aged women.

In March 2013, Victoria's Secret PINK launched a marketing campaign for its "Bright Young Things" underwear line, directed at teen and pre-teen girls, that drew considerable negative attention. The underwear contained wording such as "call me", "feeling lucky", and "wild". A Change.org petition calling for the company to discontinue its product line amassed over 24,000 subscribers. After the criticism increased, Victoria's Secret removed the items from the company's website and said that the ad campaign was meant for college-age women.

Reports of declining sales at PINK began to appear in 2018, following shifts in consumer preferences towards athleisure and a move towards more body-positive brands of underwear than parent brand Victoria's Secret. Analysts have regarded PINK as more nimble, with a better track record of shifting their marketing towards inclusivity, than their parent brand, which faced an onslaught of controversy in 2019 and 2020. As of 2020, the company had 141 stores, all attached to Victoria's Secret stores. In June 2020, Retail Dive reported that the brand's UK arm went into administration, as it struggled with falling sales, profits, and market share.

== Marketing ==
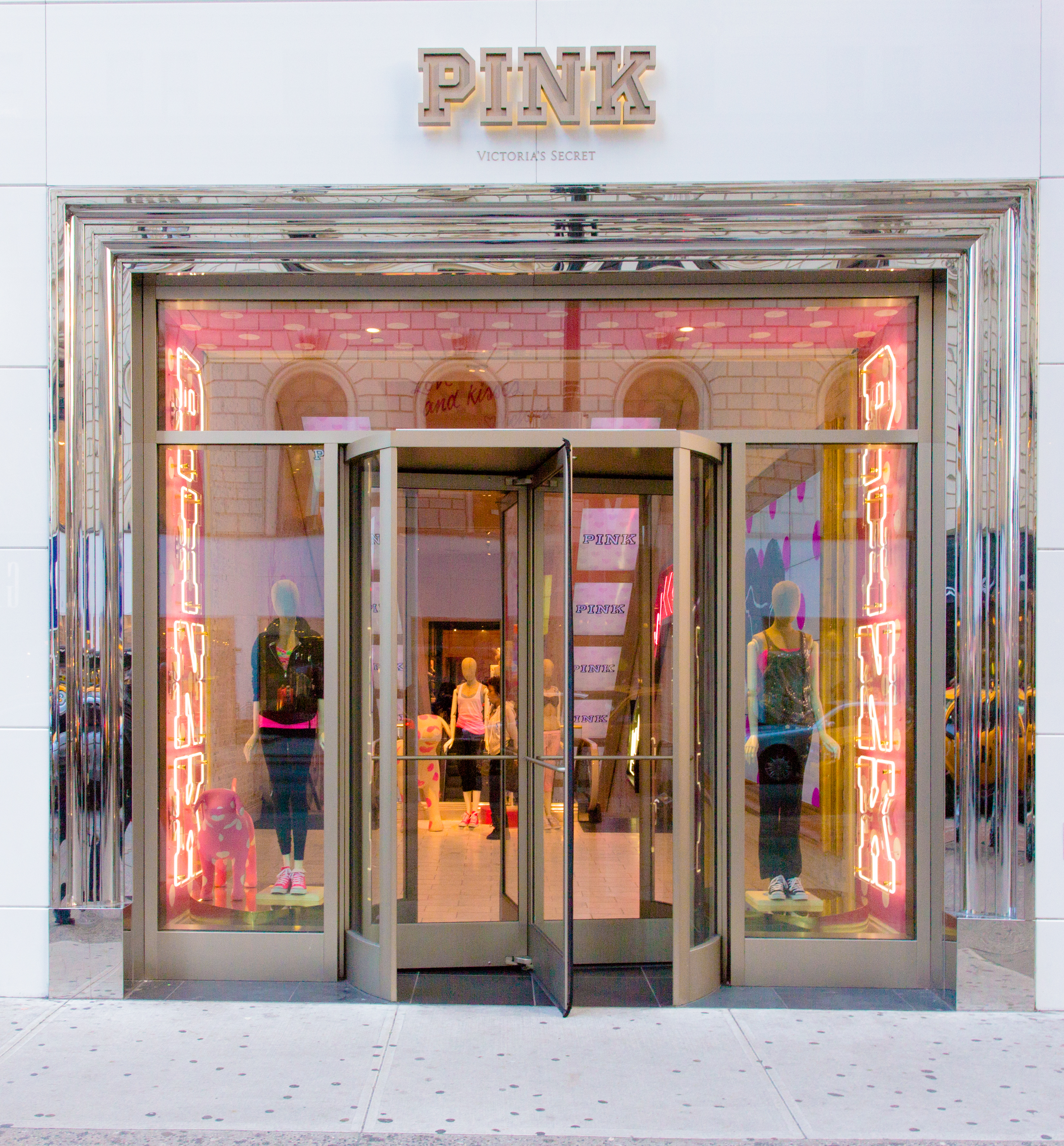
Victoria's Secret Pink Store in New York City

PINK is a division of Victoria's Secret, and was owned by American retail company L Brands. Victoria's Secret was a subsidiary of L Brands, with financials for PINK reported jointly with those of Victoria's Secret.

In a 2009 letter to shareholders, the company's founder, Les Wexner, stated in that PINK had "brought vitality, youth, energy, and an all-new customer base to base Victoria's Secret."

=== Models ===
The PINK brand has its own spokesmodels that serve as brand ambassadors. Zuri Tibby became the brand's first spokesmodel of color in 2016.

Nationality	Name	Contract
Brazil	Alessandra Ambrosio	2004–2006
Canada	Jessica Stam	2006–2007
Australia	Miranda Kerr	2006–2009
Namibia	Behati Prinsloo	2008–2011
Australia	Jessica Hart	2011–2013
Sweden	Elsa Hosk	2011–2014
United States	Rachel Hilbert	2015–2017
United States	Grace Elizabeth	2016–2018
United States	Zuri Tibby	2016–2018
United States	Maggie Laine	2018

PINK has a college line that focuses brand recognition through public university athletics, started in 2008 under the leadership of Richard Dent.

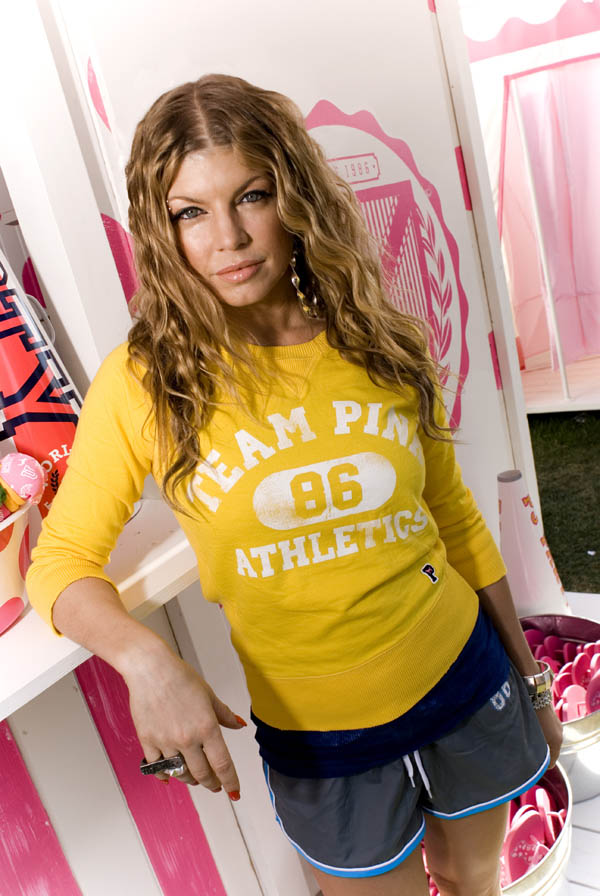
Singer Fergie wearing PINK shirt in July 2007.

The company has partnered with both MLB and the NFL for lines launched by Prinsloo as well as then Angels Chanel Iman, Erin Heatherton, and Candice Swanepoel. Since then, spokesmodels, including Hosk and Jessica Hart, have attended sporting events to promote joint ventures with MLB and the NFL.

Starting in 2010, the brand marketed their product line at spring break parties, often hosted by a pair of female models (including Behati Prinsloo, Chanel Iman, Elsa Hosk, Rachel Hilbert, Sara Sampaio, and Devon Windsor) and a male guest such as Alexander Ludwig, Nick Jonas, Cody Simpson, or Diego Boneta

The brand, via a "PINK Nation" campaign, has also promoted their products with campus bashes featuring popular performers, as in 2014 with Iggy Azalea at University of Nevada Las Vegas.

Additional models appeared at events for the brand, including Taylor Marie Hill, Emily Didonato, and Jessica Strother as well as the celebrity Ashlee Simpson.

Kylie Bisutti, a former Victoria's Secret model, headlined several Pink to Purpose events from 2013 to 2015, and since 2018. These events, unrelated to the retailer, are described as an encouragement for women "to leave the PINK lifestyle to find PURPOSE!" Bisutti perceives her past as "being at the pinnacle of the PINK lifestyle of fake, broken relationships".

PINK was central to the controversy around longtime L Brands Chief Marketing Officer Ed Razek's 2018 interview with Vogue, in which he spoke out against the inclusion of plus-size and trans models in the Victoria's Secret Fashion Show specifically, and the Victoria's Secret business model, generally. In August 2019, the first openly transgender model, Valentina Sampaio, was hired to work for PINK; Razek's resignation was announced just days later.

=== Victoria's Secret Fashion Show ===
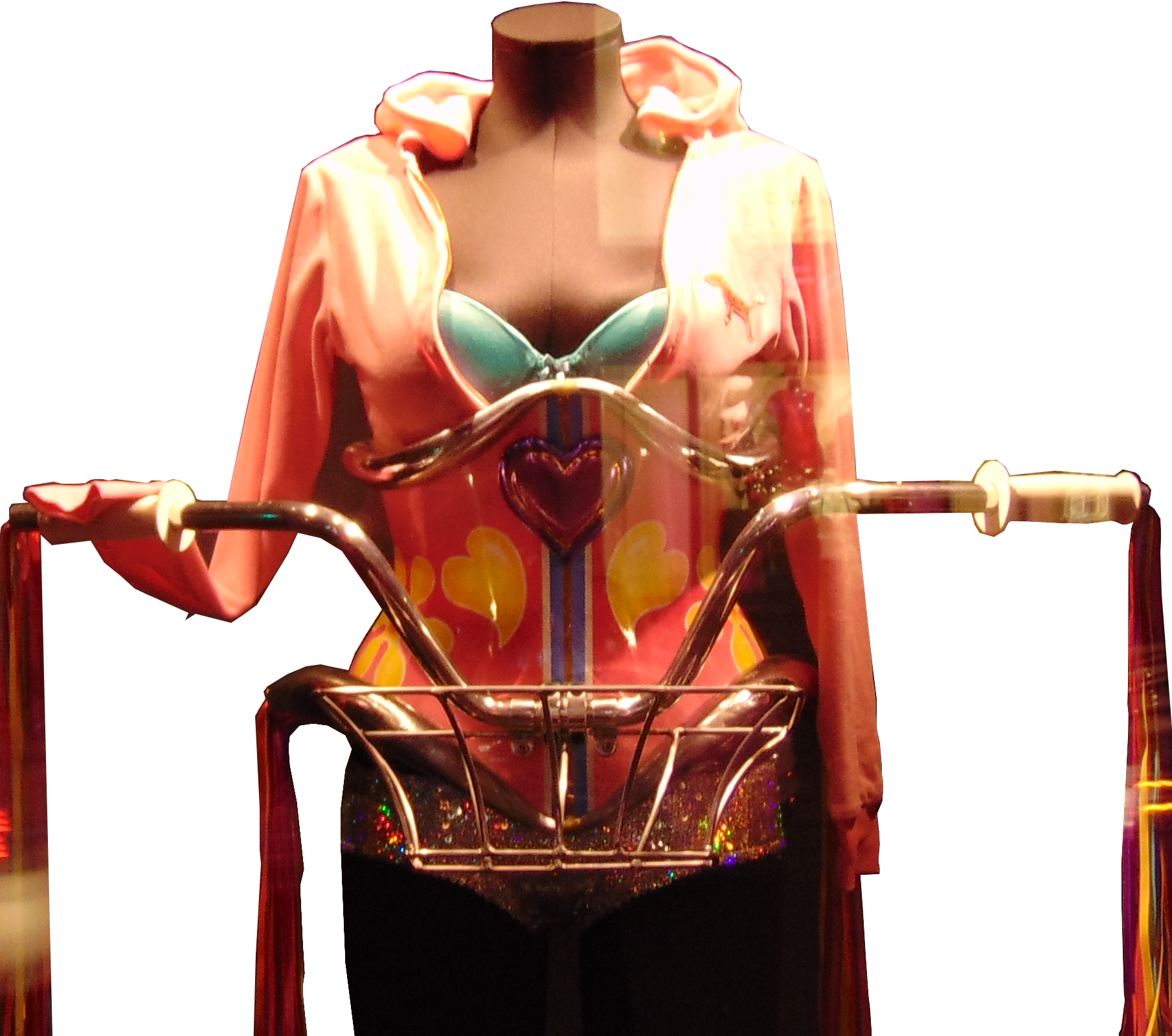
The bicycle corset, VS Fashion Show 2012 "Pink Ball" segment

There has been segment for PINK in the annual Victoria's Secret Fashion Show from 2006 to 2018, the final year of the original show. A PINK segment also appeared in the 2025 Victoria's Secret Fashion Show, during which K-Pop girl group TWICE performed.

In 2007, the brand held an event featuring spokesmodel Miranda Kerr, alongside Jessica Stam and Rosie Huntington-Whiteley. The company ran a contest called "Pink Road Trip to the Runway", awarding a spot in the 2007 fashion show to winner, Katie Wile.

The Fashion Show runway segment for PINK was initially accompanied by recorded music from popular artists. From 2010 through 2018, the PINK runway segment featured live performances by widely recognized music acts. Katy Perry was the first live performer for the PINK runway at Victoria's Secret Fashion Show 2010, performing a medley from her recently released Teenage Dream album, in addition to performing "Firework" in a segment for the main Victoria's Secret brand.

In 2012, Justin Bieber performed during the Pink segment of the fashion show, while the notorious bicycle corset, featuring only handlebars with streamers, was modeled by Jessica Hart.

PINK has also marketed their brand by sponsoring fashion show viewing parties during air time, such as in 2013 at West Virginia University.

Pink runway history

Year	Segment name	Opener	Closer	Performer	Song	Type
2006	PINK	Jessica Stam	Doutzen Kroes	Kelis	"Bossy" and "Entrance of the Gladiators"	Recording (mashup)
2007	PINK	Miranda Kerr	Flavia De Oliveira	The Vines	"Get Free"	Recording
2008	PINK Planet	Behati Prinsloo	Flavia De Oliveira	The Ting Tings and Montefiori Cocktail	"That's Not My Name" and "Hu Ha"	Recording
2009	PINK Planet	Behati Prinsloo	Shannan Click	Kings of Leon and The Four Tops	"Use Somebody" and "It's the Same Old Song"	Recording
2010	PINK	Behati Prinsloo	Chanel Iman	Katy Perry	"Teenage Dream" / "Hot n Cold" / "California Gurls"	Live performance (medley)
2011	Club PINK	Erin Heatherton	Karlie Kloss	Nicki Minaj	"Super Bass"	Live performance
2012	PINK Ball	Jessica Hart	Jourdan Dunn	Justin Bieber	"Beauty and a Beat"	Live performance (Note: Nicki Minaj did not return to the Victoria's Secret Fashion Show since her 2011 performance. As such, her vocals are played as a recording in the 2012 and 2014 performances. Jessie J and Iggy Azalea have never performed at Victoria's Secret; only their recordings of "Bang Bang" and "Problem", respectively, are played in 2014.)
2013	PINK Network	Ieva Lagūna	Monika Jagaciak	Neon Jungle	"Trouble"	Live performance
2014	University of PINK	Elsa Hosk	Monika Jagaciak	Ariana Grande	"Love Me Harder" / "Bang Bang" / "Break Free" / "Problem"	Live performance (medley)
2015	PINK USA	Taylor Hill	Taylor Hill & Megan Puleri	Selena Gomez	"Hands to Myself" / "Me & My Girls"	Live performance (medley)
2016	PINK Nation	Grace Elizabeth	Dilone	Bruno Mars	"Chunky"	Live performance
2017	PINK Millennial Nation	Grace Elizabeth	Zuri Tibby	Jane Zhang	"Work For It" / "808" / "Dust My Shoulders Off"	Live performance
2018	PINK	Grace Elizabeth	Maggie Laine	Bebe Rexha	"I'm a Mess"	Live performance
2025	PINK Halftime Show	Gabrielle Moura & Daniella Halfon	Barbie Ferreira	TWICE	"This is For" / "Strategy"	Live performance
2026	PINK Halftime Show	Trinity Rodman	Quenlin Blackwell	KATSEYE	"Pinky Up" / "Animal"	Live performance
