= Alessandra Meskita =

Brazilian fashion designer

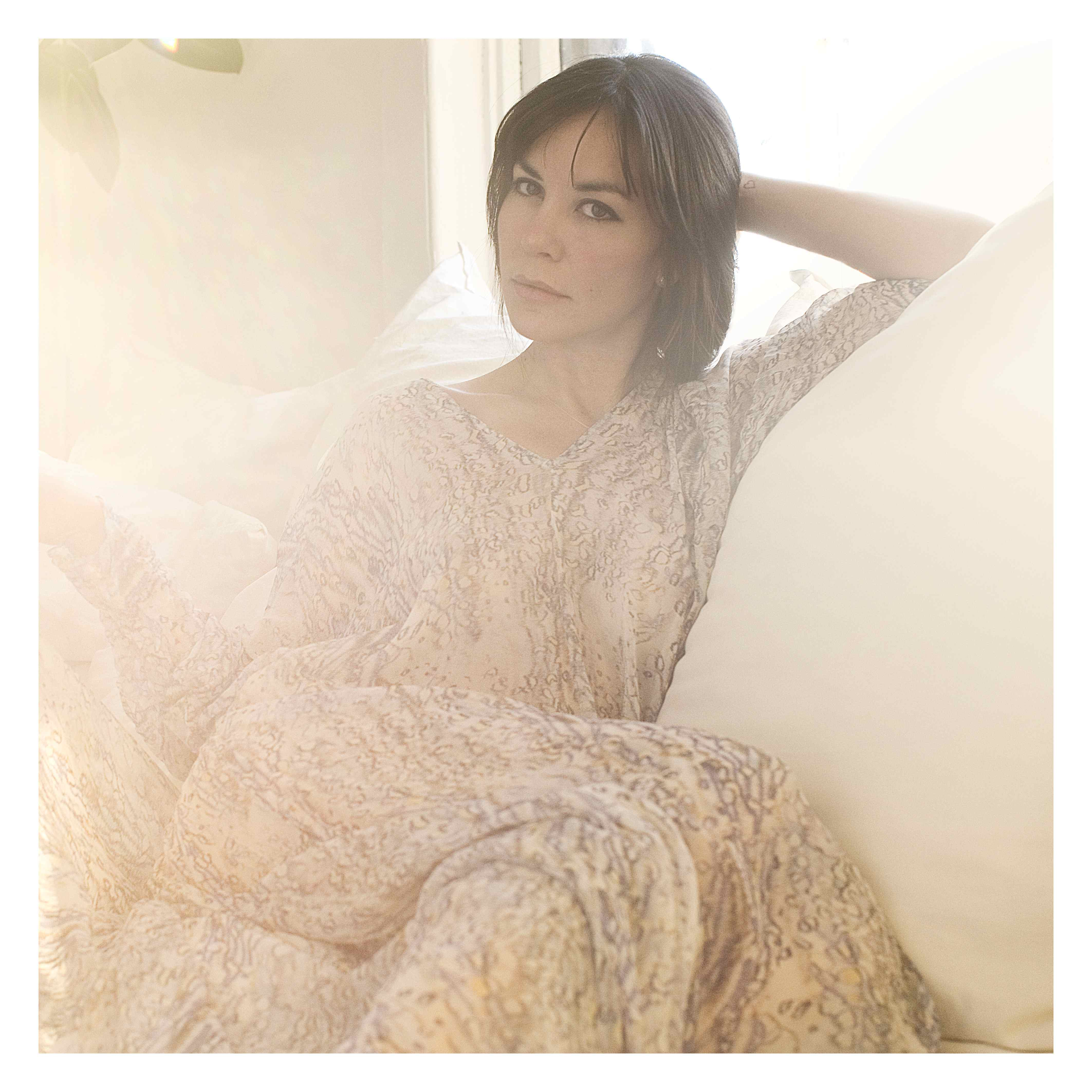
- Born: São Paulo, Brazil
- Occupation: Fashion designer
- Label: MESKITA
- Website: www.meskita.com

Alessandra Meskita is a Brazilian fashion designer. Her fashion and lifestyle line, MESKITA, features ready to wear, resort, lingerie, swimwear, shoes and home accessories.

== Early life ==
Alessandra Meskita grew up in São Paulo, Brazil. As of 2021, she resides in Miami, Florida. Her mother, a painter and sculptor, encouraged Meskita’s artistic expression, and by age 15 she was designing her own clothing. In 2007, she began her fashion career working under French designer Christian Audigier. While working for four years as his Global Creative Director, Meskita developed her use of traditional shapes and tailoring. Meskita then decided to take everything she learned and branch out to create her own clothing line, MESKITA, in 2012.

== Lines ==
Meskita is the designer of her self-titled fashion and lifestyle brand, MESKITA. The line consists of ready-to-wear, resort, lingerie, swimwear, shoes and household accessories. Meskita's designs focus on simple concepts and natural elements.

MESKITA was a featured designer in the September 2013 New York Fashion Week. Her Spring 2014 collection consisted mostly of bikinis, cover-ups, lingerie, and long dresses. The color profile included shades of nude, grey, burgundy and soft metallics. The line was inspired by the Brazilian deity Yemanja and is meant to inspire strength and beauty, helping women feel confident and independent.

In 2013, Meskita designed a collection of dresses in support of Emily Liebert's debut novel You Knew Me When. The five dresses are named for the three main characters of the novel and Emily Liebert.

In 2014, Meskita showed her Fall/Winter 2014 collection at Mercedes-Benz Fashion Week. Celebrities who attended the show included Cara Santana, Jesse Metcalfe, Cassidy Wolfe, Erin Brady, Elle creative director Joe Zee, Tamsen Fadal, Gabriela Isler, Nadeja Savcova, and many powerful magazine editors. The collection features feminine silhouettes that embrace the sensuality of the body and complement the color trend palette perfectly. The colors were predominantly vintage shades of mauve, pale creamy peach, warm nudes, and winter white, alongside dark shades of midnight blue and black, with accents in electric copper, amber and turquoise. The soft and quiet colors contrasted with hot and dark.

The inspiration for the collection was the 100th anniversary celebration of the Golden Era in Beverly Hills, made modern. The line combines the grace and feminine air of that classic time, with the flashing lights and energy of city glamour. Colors and silhouettes from the past were combined with prints and details that reflect an intense city edge.

Victoria's Secret model Barbara Fialho sported Meskita's "Vibrations" print dress on the runway.
