= Vita Sidorkina =

Russian model (born 1994)

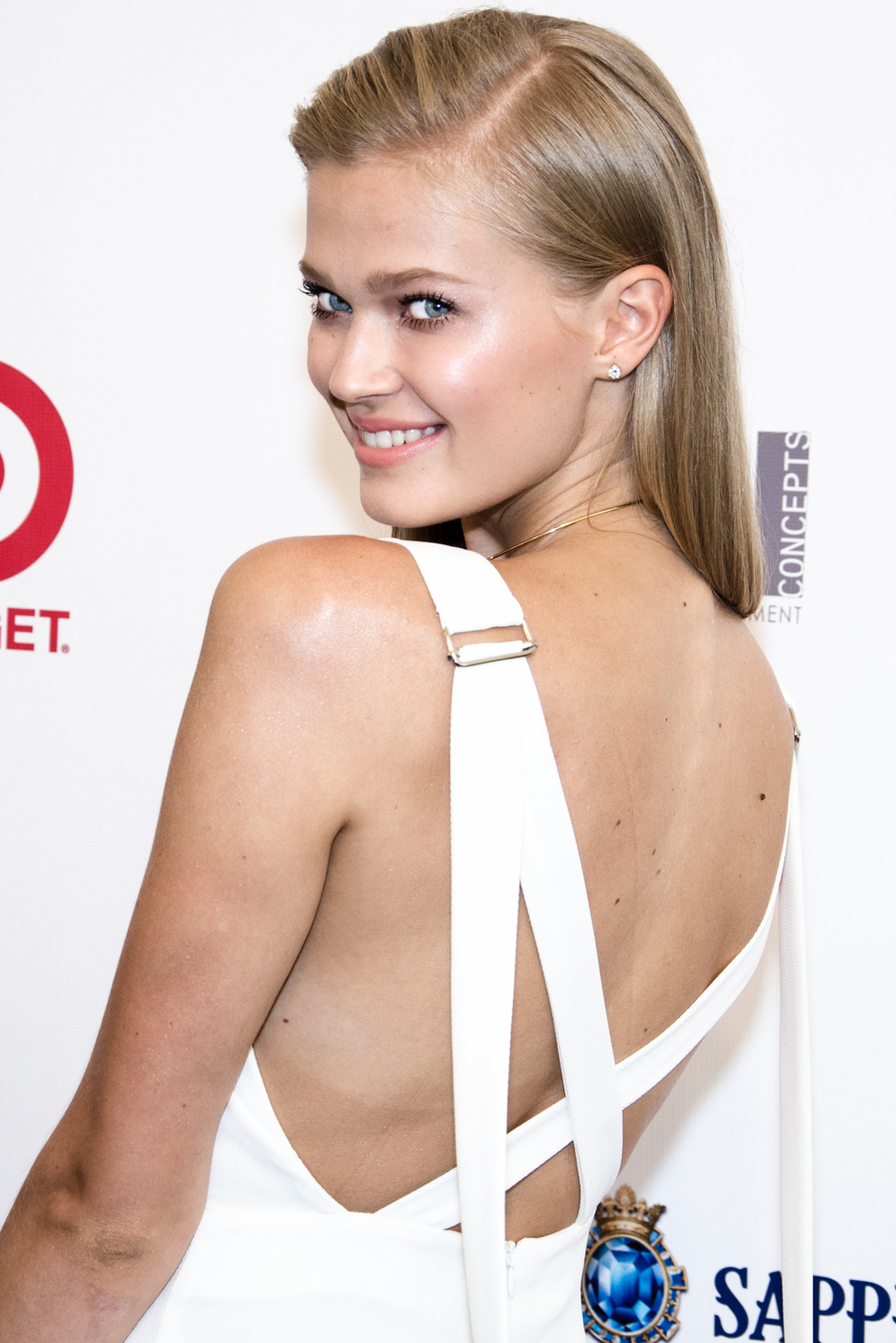
- Sidorkina at the 15th Annual Art For Life Gala in 2014
- Born: Vitalina Sidorkina; 20 March 1994 (age 32); Khabarovsk, Russia
- Occupation: Model
- Years active: 2011–present
- Spouse: Valerio Morabito (m. 2017)
- Children: 2
- Modeling information
- Height: 1.73 m (5 ft 8 in)
- Hair color: Dark blonde
- Eye color: Blue
- Agency: Elite Model Management (New York, Paris, London, Copenhagen); Dolls Model Management (Taipei)

YouTube information
- Channel: Vita Sidorkina-Morabito
- Years active: 2015–present
- Genre: Vlog
- Subscribers: 90.9 thousand
- Views: 12.3 million
- Last updated: 11 July 2026

Vitalina Sidorkina-Morabito (Russian: Виталина «Вита» Сидоркина; born 20 March 1994) is a Russian model best known for walking in Victoria's Secret Fashion Show 2015.

== Early life ==
Vita Sidorkina was born and raised in Khabarovsk. In 2011, she moved to New York City at the age of 17 in order to become a model.

== Career ==
In 2011, Sidorkina appeared in advertisings for Rebecca Minkoff and in Oyster as well as on the cover of French Revue des Modes. During the 2011 Autumn/Winter fashion show season, she walked the runway for Adam, Carmen Marc Valvo, Hermès, Joy Cioci, Moncler Gamme Rouge, Rebecca Minkoff and Tory Burch.

In 2012, she posed for L'Officiel Singapore and for the cover of Alexis and Elle. In 2013, she was featured in a fashion editorial for Creem and on the cover of Designaré.

In 2014, she posed for Vanity Fair-Italia. Since that year, she often poses for the lingerie brand Victoria's Secret and their younger line, PINK.

In 2015, she walked the Victoria's Secret Fashion Show. The same year, she appeared in editorials for Marie Claire-Spain, Dressed to Kill, Teen Vogue, Paper and Telva, and in advertisings for BCBG Max Azria, Spinelli Kilcollin and Lefties.

== Personal life ==
Sidorkina supports the Voss Foundation. In 2014, she hosted the 2nd annual Voss Foundation fundraiser at Georgica in East Hampton.

In December 2016, Sidorkina announced her engagement to her boyfriend, Valerio Morabito (b. 1974). The couple married on 29 July 2017. She gave birth to their first child, daughter Allegra, in November 2018 and her second daughter in November 2023.
