= Hands to Myself =

2016 single by Selena Gomez

Single by Selena Gomez

from the album Revival
- Released: January 20, 2016
- Recorded: July 2015
- Studio: Wolf Cousins Studios and Maratone Studios (Stockholm, Sweden); Interscope Studios (Santa Monica, California)
- Genre: Dance-pop; synth-pop
- Length: 3:20
- Label: Interscope
- Songwriters: Justin Tranter; Julia Michaels; Robin Fredriksson; Mattias Larsson; Max Martin; Selena Gomez (Note: Gomez is not credited as a writer on the Revival booklet, although she is listed as a writer in both ASCAP and BMI repertoires.)
- Producers: Mattman & Robin; Max Martin

Selena Gomez singles chronology
"Same Old Love" (2015)	"Hands to Myself" (2016)	"Kill Em with Kindness" (2016)

Music video
- "Hands to Myself" on YouTube

"Hands to Myself" is a song recorded by American singer Selena Gomez for her second studio album, Revival (2015). It was released on January 20, 2016, as the record's third single by Interscope Records. The track was written by Gomez, Justin Tranter, Julia Michaels, and its producers Mattman & Robin and Max Martin. It is meant to add a fresh female perspective to the album and was influenced by the music of Prince. Musically, it is a dance-pop and synth-pop song backed by lightly clicking percussion, hand claps, a guitar riff and "tribal pop" synths. Throughout the track, Gomez uses both her higher vocal register for belting, as well as her lower range breathy vocals in a volume just above a whisper. She clips her enunciation of the lyrics, which detail sexual desire.

"Hands to Myself" received acclaim from music critics, who complimented its uncharacteristic production and lyrics, as well as Gomez's versatile vocal performance. An accompanying music video directed by Alek Keshishian was premiered as an Apple Music exclusive on December 21, 2015. The video depicts a film of Gomez dressed in lingerie playing a stalker of a Hollywood actor; critics commended its cinematography and the singer's appearance, hailing it as her sexiest and most revealing visual yet. Gomez promoted the song with televised performances on the 2015 Victoria's Secret Fashion Show and Saturday Night Live. It has also been lip-synched to by the Victoria's Secret Angels in a promotional video, and used in Beats Electronics' commercial for their Beats Pill portable speaker and was also featured in a television commercial for Pantene. Commercially, "Hands to Myself" reached number seven on the US Billboard Hot 100, becoming Gomez's fifth consecutive top-ten hit in the United States and third from Revival. It also peaked within the top ten in Canada, New Zealand, Portugal and Slovakia, and the top twenty in Australia and the United Kingdom.

== Writing and production ==
"Hands to Myself" was written by Justin Tranter, Julia Michaels, Robin Fredriksson, Mattias Larsson, Max Martin and Selena Gomez. The second-to-last song recorded for Selena Gomez's second studio album, Revival (2015), "Hands to Myself" was described by Gomez as "a beautiful accident" and "probably the best song on the album". Following the success of the album's lead single "Good for You" which Julia Michaels and Justin Tranter co-wrote, Gomez decided to collaborate for an additional four days with Michaels and Tranter despite her label's instructions for the album to be mixed at the time. Before the sessions began, Gomez felt that she had already addressed her desired themes for Revival, but wanted additional material that would be fresh from a female perspective.

The idea of development for "Hands to Myself" started with the hook, "Can't keep my hands to myself", which Michaels had voiced in a note on her cellphone after singing it in her car. She first approached Tranter, and Robin Fredriksson of Mattman & Robin with the hook, asking, "Is this stupid? This could be really cool, I think". Later, Michaels suggested to Gomez that the track should sound like Prince's music; Gomez enthusiastically agreed. Michaels was also banging a cup on a desk at the session, inspiring a similar sound included in the recording. Another lyric, "You're metaphorical gin-and-juice", was a line Tranter had initially tried using in "a hundred" other songs. A demo of the song was recorded within a day with production from Mattman & Robin who told Gomez that it should be sent to producer Max Martin for further vocal production. At first unsure, Gomez acceded to the duo's suggestion. Martin immediately responded through FaceTime, describing it as the best thing he had heard all year. He included ad libitum and additional vocal hooks at the song's final chorus while also adjusting its pre-chorus. Recording took place at Wolf Cousins and Maratone Studios in Stockholm, Sweden, and at Interscope Studios in Santa Monica, California.

== Composition and lyrical interpretation ==
"Hands to Myself"
A 19-second sample of "Hands to Myself" featuring Gomez singing the line "I mean I could but why would I want to?" in a melodic burst before a crescendo in the track's final chorus.

"Hands to Myself" is a dance-pop and synth-pop song. It begins stripped-down with a minimal backdrop and a sparse, thumping beat. This comprises drums, bass, lightly clicking percussion and hand claps. The beat then snaps and percolates as a dark guitar riff, reminiscent of the Pixies' "Where Is My Mind?" (1988), plays beneath it. Using her lower vocal register and breathy vocals, Gomez coos in an octave just above a whisper. She clips her enunciation with a string of consecutive syllables, "Can't-keep-my-hands-to-my-self".

At the pre-chorus, the song pertains to a "tribal pop" sound with synths and piano becoming prominent. Gomez extends her vocal range belting, "All of the downs and the uppers / Keep making love to each other / And I'm trying, trying, I'm trying, trying". In the chorus, she is then accompanied by gasping background vocals sung by Michaels. Before the final chorus, the music cuts out; Gomez then sings the line "I mean I could but why would I want to?" unaccompanied in one melodic burst. The song ends in a booming crescendo with Gomez's vocal breaking into gasps and sighs.

Lyrically, "Hands to Myself" express sexual desire and wish to find love through good and bad situations. Sam Wolfson of Vice magazine opines that at first the lyrics suggest a typical song about sexual desire, but a "darker undercurrent" then becomes apparent; "there's two narratives at play – a surface and a more hostile truth", he explained. According to Wolfson, the "all of the downs and the uppers" lyric implies a relationship affected by drugs and mental health, further manifested in the line, "The doctors say you're no good". Spencer Kornhaber of The Atlantic writes that the lyric "you're metaphorical gin-and-juice" "rebukes the idea that Millennials like the 23-year-old Gomez don't get the meaning of 'literal'; is a redundant description given that it's unlikely she'd be singing to an actual cocktail; and is further proof of Long Beach gangsta rap's grand influence". "Hands to Myself" is written in the key of E♭ major with a tempo of 111 beats per minute. The song follows a chord progression of E♭ – Gm – Cm – B♭, with Gomez's vocals ranging from the low note of B♭_{3} to the high note of C♯_{5}.

== Critical reception ==
Dave Hanratty from Drowned in Sound deemed it a "laser-focused sugar rush". Brittany Spanos of Rolling Stone praised the song's fun and flirty sound, writing, "Her brand of sexiness has a coy, subtle quality that never tries too hard". Sal Cinquemani, writer for Slant Magazine, said Gomez's vocal performance made the track interesting, describing it as smartly indebted to that of Robyn; "success is a pretty girl who knows how to play her cards," he concluded. Jamieson Cox of The Verge commented: "She's a piece of the puzzle rather than a figure at the forefront, and her bigger moments are made to look more impressive by the gulf between them and her hushed, clipped verses. The result is something that sounds like an upper-case version of the xx, and it's a great look for Selena. Smart writing always wins." USA Today critic Elysa Gardner commended Gomez's "sense of poise and reserve" on the song which she highlighted as "lithe".

Ed Masley from The Arizona Republic regarded Gomez's phrasing as brilliant and deemed "Hands to Myself" the sexiest track the singer had done. Masley also complimented the production which he felt was uncharacteristic for Martin, likening it to 1990s productions by The Neptunes. Similarly, Los Angeles Times critic Mikael Wood commended Gomez's vocal performance as "a study in restraint" and Martin's production as "uncharacteristically delicate". Spencer Kornhaber from The Atlantic called it "instantly catchy", highlighting the "wonderfully bizarre" lyrics. Jia Tolentino of Spin magazine regarded "Hands to Myself" as "weightless meditation on seduction" and lauded its "dance tent's worth of pent-up energy" and "perfect interlude". Brennan Carley, also writing for Spin, complimented Gomez's "impeccable" phrasing and the track's "crisp" production, further noting that the song manifested Gomez's growth as a singer; he wrote she "breathes life" into the song and excels at "stretching the boundaries of what her aerated tones can achieve".

Myles Tanzer from The Fader wrote: "Swedish [production] perfection aside, Gomez makes the song. Her vocal performance is equal parts power and fun." Another The Fader writer said Gomez sounded "borderline unrecognizable", adding, "and I'm 100% here for the glo up". Sal Maicki of Complex magazine called it "a certified banger", adding, "It's intimate and mature, whilst ridiculously catchy". Lauren Nostro of the same publication deemed the track "absolutely irresistible", and opined that it marked a peak for Gomez's coy attitude and breathy vocals. Nostro concluded: "It's an effortlessly catchy pop smash, but more importantly, it finds Selena at her most playful—she's making grown and sexy music now, and she's not afraid to show it." Some critics viewed the song's "I mean I could but why would I want to?" line as one of the best moments in pop music in 2015. Billboard ranked "Hands to Myself" at number 91 on their "Billboard's 100 Best Pop Songs of 2016: Critics' Picks" list, writing “Breathy, sexy fun, and Selena Gomez's quivering delivery of the coy lyrics makes you really believe she literally cannot let her hands stay idle. It also contains quite possibly the best throwaway line of the year.”

== Accolades ==
=== Year-end lists ===
	Publication	List	Rank
2015	Complex	The Best Songs of 2015	50
2015	Rolling Stone	Rob Sheffield's Top 25 Songs of 2015	15
2015	Spin	The 101 Best Songs of 2015	92
2015	The Arizona Republic	30 Best Songs of 2015	30
2015	The Fader	The 107 Best Songs of 2015	103
2016	Billboard	100 Best Pop Songs of 2016: Critics' Picks	91
2021	Billboard	The 100 Greatest Song Bridges of the 21st Century	97

== Awards and nominations ==
Year	Award	Category	Result	Ref.
2016	iHeartRadio MMVAs	iHeartRadio International Artist of the Year	Nominated	
2016	iHeartRadio MMVAs	Most Buzzworthy International Artist or Group	Nominated	
2016	iHeartRadio Music Awards	Best Cover Song (Covering Troye Sivan)	Nominated	
2016	Teen Choice Awards	Choice Song: Female Artist	Nominated	
2016	Teen Choice Awards	Choice Love Song	Nominated	
2017	iHeartRadio Music Awards	Best Cover Song (Covering DNCE)	Nominated	

== Chart performance ==
Despite Interscope's promotion, and strong airplay of Revival's second single "Same Old Love" at the time, "Hands to Myself" managed to initially find commercial success with minimal promotion ahead of an announced release date after an accompanying music video that shows a lip-synced version of "Hands to Myself" by Victoria's Secret Angels. "Hands to Myself" debuted at number 77 in the US Billboard Hot 100 chart dated December 26, 2015. Following the release of its accompanying music video, the song rose from number 62 to number 39—prompted by a 95% sales increase (47,000 copies) and a 43% increase in streams (five million) that week—and also climbed from number 46 to number 18 on the US Digital Songs chart and debuted at number 37 on the US Streaming Songs chart. For the week ending February 13, 2016, the song rocketed from number 21 to seven on the Hot 100, giving Gomez her fifth top ten hit overall and third from Revival. As of July 2022 ''Hands to Myself'' had sold 1.1 million copies and earned 438 million on-demand streams in the US, according to Nielsen Soundscan.

"Hands to Myself" debuted at number 74 on the Canadian Hot 100 chart for the week ending December 26, 2015. In its eighth charting week, the song leaped 18 places from number 23 to five, marking it as Gomez's highest-charting single on the chart and first top-five hit. In Australia, it entered the ARIA Singles Chart at number 87 on the chart dated December 26, 2015, and peaked at number 13. The song debuted at number 33 on the New Zealand Singles Chart for the week ending January 4, 2016, and has since peaked at number five, giving Gomez her first top five single in New Zealand. "Hands to Myself" debuted at number 75 on the UK Singles Chart issued for February 4, 2016, reaching number 14 on April 8, 2016, becoming the album's first top-twenty single and her highest-charting single since "Come & Get It" (2013).

== Music video ==
=== Background and release ===
The accompanying music video for "Hands to Myself" was directed by Alek Keshishian and filmed in Hollywood Hills, California. Christopher Mason of Wilhelmina Models plays Gomez's love interest in the music video. Gomez and Keshishian had met a number of times socially before, though "Hands to Myself" marked their first time working together. Gomez recruited Keshishian inspired by his work on Madonna's 1991 documentary Madonna: Truth or Dare. Keshishian explained: "I always like to find a different way of seeing a celebrity. [And] Selena's head was in the same place." He felt it was important to incorporate attention to detail for visuals such as Gomez wearing an engagement ring to depict her as a stalker thinking she is married to Mason, and Mason's extravagant closet to portray him as rich and successful. Gomez wore lingerie from the Emporio Armani underwear collection. Regarding the filming, Keshishian mentioned: "We would be lighting with a stand-in and then [Gomez] would come in and it would be a completely live shot with her. She's so good at it." The singer wanted to convey the feeling people get when they have lust and obsess towards someone else, portraying it in the video's plot and plot twist. She explained the concept in detail:

I wanted the idea to feel like it was two different versions of being in this fantasy. I think everybody can have those moments where they're dreaming about what their life could be, especially girls with love. Being obsessed with the idea, and you can't control yourself because that's what you want, no matter what's happening. (...) You get to see these images of what people think love is. It's theatrical, it's movie-like. And all that you end up seeing ends up being this false reality on both ends. That's what I wanted it to feel like.

Gomez partnered with Beats Electronics for the "Hands to Myself" music video, promoting their Beats Pill portable speaker. She shared a 30-second preview clip of the music video on Facebook on December 7, 2015. The clip which heavily features the Beats Pill tied in as Beats Electronics' commercial for the product. On December 17, 2015, Gomez posted two image teasers on Instagram and then a second preview clip the following day. The music video premiered as an Apple Music exclusive on December 21, 2015, like its predecessor "Same Old Love". It remained on the service for almost a month, until being released on Vevo on January 20, 2016.

=== Synopsis ===
Mason and Gomez in a revealing love scene imagined from Gomez's stalker mind-frame

In the music video, Mason plays the role of an actor while Gomez plays his stalker. The video begins with a handcuffed Gomez writhing around on a bed, donning an engagement ring, a wig and black silk robe. Shots of marked maps and an image collage of Mason on a wall are then shown. Gomez later breaks into Mason's modern penthouse apartment with the intention of fulfilling a sexual fantasy of him. On arrival, Gomez takes off her robe and wears only spiked stilettos and black lingerie consisting of a bra and high-waisted underwear. She searches through his color-coordinated closet and tries on one of his dress shirts. Dancing in the shirt, Gomez proceeds to smelling his cologne bottle.

Gomez is then depicted writhing around on his bed caressing herself as she imagines a love scene with Mason. In another segment, she is shown taking a hot bath, imagining him in a shower. Gomez also watches a marathon of movies in which Mason stars. Tired, she proceeds back upstairs wrapped in a bed sheet where one of Mason's film posters titled The Obsession is shown at the staircase wall. Gomez then passes out on his bed. Mason later arrives home and realizes that something is wrong and calls the police who arrest Gomez. In a plot twist, the video ends zooming out from the preceding events, showing Gomez and Mason happily cuddling on a couch watching a film called Hands to Myself in which they starred.

=== Reception ===
The music video's release aided a 46% gain of 180,000 Twitter mentions for Gomez in the week ending December 27, 2015, according to Next Big Sound. It was well received by critics. Billboard magazine's Colin Stutz said: "It's not your standard love story, by far, and it's probably the sexiest we've seen Gomez get yet." Both Lauren Alexis Fisher of Harper's Bazaar and Kelly McClure from Maxim magazine hailed it as Gomez's sexiest video yet, with the former likening it to the 2015 film Fifty Shades of Grey. Nick Maslow from People magazine regarded the video as "undoubtedly Gomez's most revealing offering to date". Nylon magazine's Daniel Barna remarked that Gomez "looks sexier and more secure than ever". Digital Spy's Lewis Corner opined that the video was "appropriately seductive" and described it as Gomez's "raunchiest visual yet". Madeline Roth of MTV News wrote that "being a felon never looked so good" and found the visual's plot twist clever.

Chris Mench from Complex hailed it as "quite a spectacle". Sean Fitz-Gerald of New York magazine deemed it "very cinematic, twisty", likening it to the 2015 film The Gift. Meghan Overdeep from InStyle commented: "Gomez takes on a persona that couldn't be farther from her Barney & Friends days, and wow ... she's looking good!" Brennan Carley of Spin magazine called it "a sexy psycho-thriller" and viewed its Apple Music exclusive release as "a smart pop play"; he opined that its exclusivity was well-timed considering the success of "Same Old Love" at the time and felt that the video's exclusivity would help build "widespread buzz" for "Hands to Myself". Conversely, Tessa Berenson from Time magazine found the music video "a little creepy". In May 2018, in a music video countdown, Garry Sutton of Buzzfeed voted the video as Selena's' best music visual work.

== Live performances and cover versions ==
Gomez gave her first televised rendition of "Hands to Myself" on Victoria's Secret Fashion Show which aired on December 8, 2015, performing it in a medley with Revival album track "Me & My Girls" while flanked by 14 female backup dancers. The performance was choreographed by Jermaine Browne. Gomez included "Hands to Myself" as part of her setlist for iHeartRadio's Jingle Ball Tour throughout December 2015. She performed the song with Taylor Swift at the second Los Angeles show of Swift's Reputation Stadium Tour in 2018.

As the music guest on Saturday Night Live on January 23, 2016, Gomez performed a bed choreography for the song. She started out singing on top a satin bed while a male dancer touched and danced around her. Then a second dancer appeared (a female) and joined them. On December 1, 2015, the Victoria's Secret Angels released a promotional video in which they lip-synced to "Hands to Myself". American band DNCE and Kings of Leon performed a cover of the song for the BBC Radio 1 Live Lounge. American duo Niki & Gabi released a cover version of the song in February 2016. Australian pop-duo The Veronicas performed a cover of the song at The Edge in 2016. "Hands to Myself" was included on the setlist for Gomez's 2016 Revival Tour.

== Track listings ==
- Digital download
1. Hands to Myself - 3:20
- Digital download (Remixes)
1. Hands to Myself (Betablock3r Remix) - 5:16
2. Hands to Myself (Fareoh Remix) - 3:01
3. Hands to Myself (KANDY Remix) - 3:18

== Credits and personnel ==
Credits adapted from Revival album liner notes.

Recording

- Recorded at Wolf Cousins Studios and Maratone Studios (Stockholm, Sweden), and Interscope Studios (Santa Monica, California)
- Mixed at MixStar Studios (Virginia Beach, Virginia)
- Mastered at Sterling Sound (New York City, New York)

Management

- Published by Justin's School for Girls (BMI) and Warner-Tamerlane Publishing Corp. (BMI)
- All rights administered by Warner-Tamerlane Publishing Corp. (BMI) and Thanks for the Songs Richard (BMI)
- All rights on behalf of itself and Thanks for the Songs Richard (BMI) — administered by Warner-Tamerlane Publishing Corp. —, Ma-Jay Publishing/Wolf Cousins/Warner Chappell Music Scandinavia (STIM) and MXM — administered by Kobalt (ASCAP)

Personnel

- Selena Gomez – lead vocals, writer
- Justin Tranter – writer
- Julia Michaels – writer, background vocals
- Mattman & Robin – writers, producers, vocal producers, programming, guitar, drums, percussion, piano, synths, bass, recording
- Max Martin – writer, vocal producer, programming, synths, percussion
- Juan Carlos Torrado – recording assistant
- Serban Ghenea – mixing
- John Hanes – mixing engineer
- Chris Gehringer – mastering

== Charts ==
=== Weekly charts ===
Chart (2016–2017)	Peak position
Australia (ARIA)	13
Austria (Ö3 Austria Top 40)	37
Belgium (Ultratop 50 Flanders)	50
Belgium (Ultratop 50 Wallonia)	46
Canada Hot 100 (Billboard)	5
Canada CHR/Top 40 (Billboard)	4
Czech Republic Airplay (ČNS IFPI)	40
Czech Republic Singles Digital (ČNS IFPI)	10
Denmark (Tracklisten)	22
Finland Airplay (Radiosoittolista)	19
France (SNEP)	118
Germany (GfK)	52
Hungary (Stream Top 40)	14
Ireland (IRMA)	24
Italy (FIMI)	38
Mexico Ingles Airplay (Billboard)	23
Netherlands (Dutch Top 40)	33
Netherlands (Single Top 100)	32
New Zealand (Recorded Music NZ)	5
Norway (VG-lista)	18
Portugal (AFP)	9
Scottish Singles Sales (Official Charts)	8
Slovakia Singles Digital (ČNS IFPI)	8
South Africa Airplay (EMA)	9
Spain (Promusicae)	55
Sweden (Sverigetopplistan)	20
Switzerland (Schweizer Hitparade)	40
UK Singles (Official Charts)	14
US Billboard Hot 100	7
US Adult Contemporary (Billboard)	26
US Adult Pop Airplay (Billboard)	13
US Dance Airplay (Billboard)	15
US Dance Club Songs (Billboard)	38
US Pop Airplay (Billboard)	1
US Rhythmic Airplay (Billboard)	21

=== Year-end charts ===
Chart (2016)	Position
Australia (ARIA)	50
Canada (Canadian Hot 100)	40
Czech Republic (Top 200 Óčko 2016)	184
Denmark (Tracklisten)	94
New Zealand (Recorded Music NZ)	43
UK Singles (Official Charts Company)	67
US Billboard Hot 100	56
US Mainstream Top 40 (Billboard)	26

== Certifications ==
Region	Certification	Certified units/sales
Australia (ARIA)	4× Platinum	280,000^{‡}
Austria (IFPI Austria)	Gold	15,000^{‡}
Brazil (Pro-Música Brasil)	Diamond	250,000^{‡}
Canada (Music Canada)	Platinum	80,000^{*}
Denmark (IFPI Danmark)	Platinum	90,000^{‡}
Germany (BVMI)	Gold	200,000^{‡}
Italy (FIMI)	Platinum	50,000^{‡}
New Zealand (RMNZ)	2× Platinum	60,000^{‡}
Norway (IFPI Norway)	2× Platinum	120,000^{‡}
Portugal (AFP)	Platinum	10,000^{‡}
Spain (Promusicae)	Gold	30,000^{‡}
Sweden (GLF)	2× Platinum	80,000^{‡}
United Kingdom (BPI)	Platinum	600,000^{‡}
United States (RIAA)	2× Platinum	2,000,000
^{*} Sales figures based on certification alone.^{‡} Sales+streaming figures based on certification alone.

== Release history ==
Country	Date	Format	Label	Ref.
United States	January 26, 2016	Contemporary hit radio	Interscope	
United States	February 16, 2016	Rhythmic contemporary	Interscope	
Italy	March 4, 2016	Contemporary hit radio	Universal	

== See also ==
- List of Billboard Hot 100 top-ten singles in 2016
