= Etam plc v Rowan =

UK employment discrimination case concerning genuine occupational requirements

- Court: Employment Appeal Tribunal
- Citation: [1989] IRLR 150

Keywords
- Discrimination

Etam plc v Rowan [1989] IRLR 150 is a UK labour law case concerning discrimination, and genuine occupational requirements. It would now fall under the Equality Act 2010 Schedule 9.

== Facts ==
Mr Rowan applied for a job in Etam plc's women's clothing shop. The job involved changing room duties and the employers argued there was a genuine occupational qualification under SDA 1975 section 7(2)(b). He argued that section 7(4) would be triggered, because other women could do the changing room.

The Tribunal found that there was sex discrimination and no genuine occupational qualification.

== Judgment ==
The Employment Appeal Tribunal held that Mr Rowan ‘would have been able to adequately carry out the bulk of the job of sales assistant, and such parts as he could not carry out could easily have been done by other sales assistants without causing any inconvenience or difficulty for the appellants.’

== See also ==
- UK labour law
- UK employment equality law
