= Rachel Hilbert =

American model (born 1995)

- Born: Rachel Leigh Hilbert; March 14, 1995 (age 31); Rochester, New York
- Occupations: Model, actress
- Years active: 2012–present
- Known for: PINK
- Partner: Single
- Modeling information
- Hair color: Blonde
- Eye color: Blue
- Agency: Muse models (New York); Kult (Germany); Miami (Next Models); Los Angeles) LA models Australia (IMG models); London Kult Models; Germany (Kult Models); Brazil (Joy Models); Acting Agency (Sovereign Talent Group)
- Website: www.rachelhilbert.com

Rachel Leigh Hilbert (born March 14, 1995) is an American fashion model. She is best known for being a spokesmodel for Victoria's Secret's lingerie and apparel line, PINK as well as walking Victoria's Secret Fashion Show from 2015 to 2017.

== Early life ==
Hilbert grew up in Webster, New York, a suburb of Rochester. Hilbert modeled locally in her youth, until her mother brought her to New York City during spring break of her second year in high school to audition for various modeling agencies. Hilbert was a competitive high school skier and dancer at Webster Thomas High School, where she graduated in 2013.

== Career ==
In 2014, she became the official spokesmodel for Victoria's Secret's lingerie and apparel line, PINK, and walked in the annual Victoria's Secret Fashion Show from 2015 to 2017.

In 2015, she starred in one episode of the TV series Younger, where she played a minor character alongside Nico Tortorella, Hilary Duff and Sutton Foster. Earlier the same year, she had hosted a Spring Break event for PINK with Gigi Hadid and Cody Simpson. She was also featured in Brett Eldredge's music video for the song "Lose My Mind", in which she played a nurse. In 2018 Hilbert suffered from major injuries a broken foot, followed by two broken arms at the same time, and a tendon transfer, resulting in her having to take a break from modeling. In 2019 Hilbert was one of the lead roles in the movie "Three days Rising". In 2019 Hilbert was in multiple fashion campaigns. In 2020 Hilbert was featured in multiple fashion magazines and filmed the movie "The Retaliators" coming out in 2021. In 2022, and on Rachel has fronted many fashion campaigns, including in 2025 becoming "Lady Godiva" the face of Godiva Chocolate globally.

Rachel fronted campaigns for Urban Outfitters, Delia's, Macy's, Free People, Juicy Couture, Kohl's. She has also been featured in international editions of many magazines, such as Cosmopolitan, Elle, Harper's Bazaar, L'Officiel, Hamptons, Playboy, Maxim, and Marie Claire. She appeared on multiple magazine covers, including the 25th anniversary issue of Lucire.

== Filmography ==
Television
Year	Title	Role	Notes
2015	2015 NBA All Star All Style	Herself	Model; Television special
2015	Victoria's Secret Fashion Show	Herself	Model; Television special
2015	Younger	Super Hot Girl	Episode: "The Exes"

Film
Year	Title	Role	Notes
2021	The Retaliators	Sophie	
TBA	3 Days Rising	Katie	

Music video
Year	Title	Artist	Role
2015	"Lose My Mind"	Brett Eldredge	Nurse
