= Lana Zakocela =

Latvian model

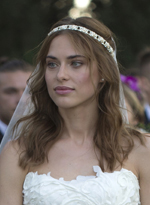
- Born: 1985 or 1986 (age 40–41); Daugavpils, Latvia
- Occupation: Model
- Modeling information
- Height: 1.73 m (5 ft 8 in)
- Hair color: Brown
- Eye color: Green–gray
- Agency: Karin Models (Paris); Next Model Management (Milan, Miami); The Hive Management (London); View Management (Barcelona); Scoop Models (Copenhagen); Modelwerk (Hamburg)

Lana Zakocela (born 1985) is a Latvian fashion model based in Los Angeles.

== Career ==
Zakocela was born in Daugavpils, Latvia. At the age of 16, she moved to England. She studied in Chatham Grammar School.

Zakocela used to be a model and previously appeared in some advertising for Garnier, Dior, Clarins, Lancaster, and Thierry Mugler, Lancôme, Cartier, and Graff. She appeared in a supplemental piece about parties in Vogue Taiwan in 2013.

Zakocela was featured in 2015 for a Spanish advert for Antonio Banderas' fragrance "Queen of Seduction". She was Maxim's May 2017 cover girl.

== Notable covers ==
- Bulgaria Elle (2017)
- Grazia Spain (2013)
- BIBA (2012)
- En Vie (2011)
- Monsoon (2011)
- Votre Beauté France (2009)
- Maxim (2017)

== Personal life ==
In 2015, Zakocela, married entrepreneur and diplomat Justin Etzin in a lavish wedding in Seychelles. Etzin filed for an uncontested divorce due to Zakocela Infidelity in February 2017, but Zakocela contested, wanting a large financial settlement. The couple are still married and negotiating a divorce settlement.
