= Hannah Ferguson =

American model

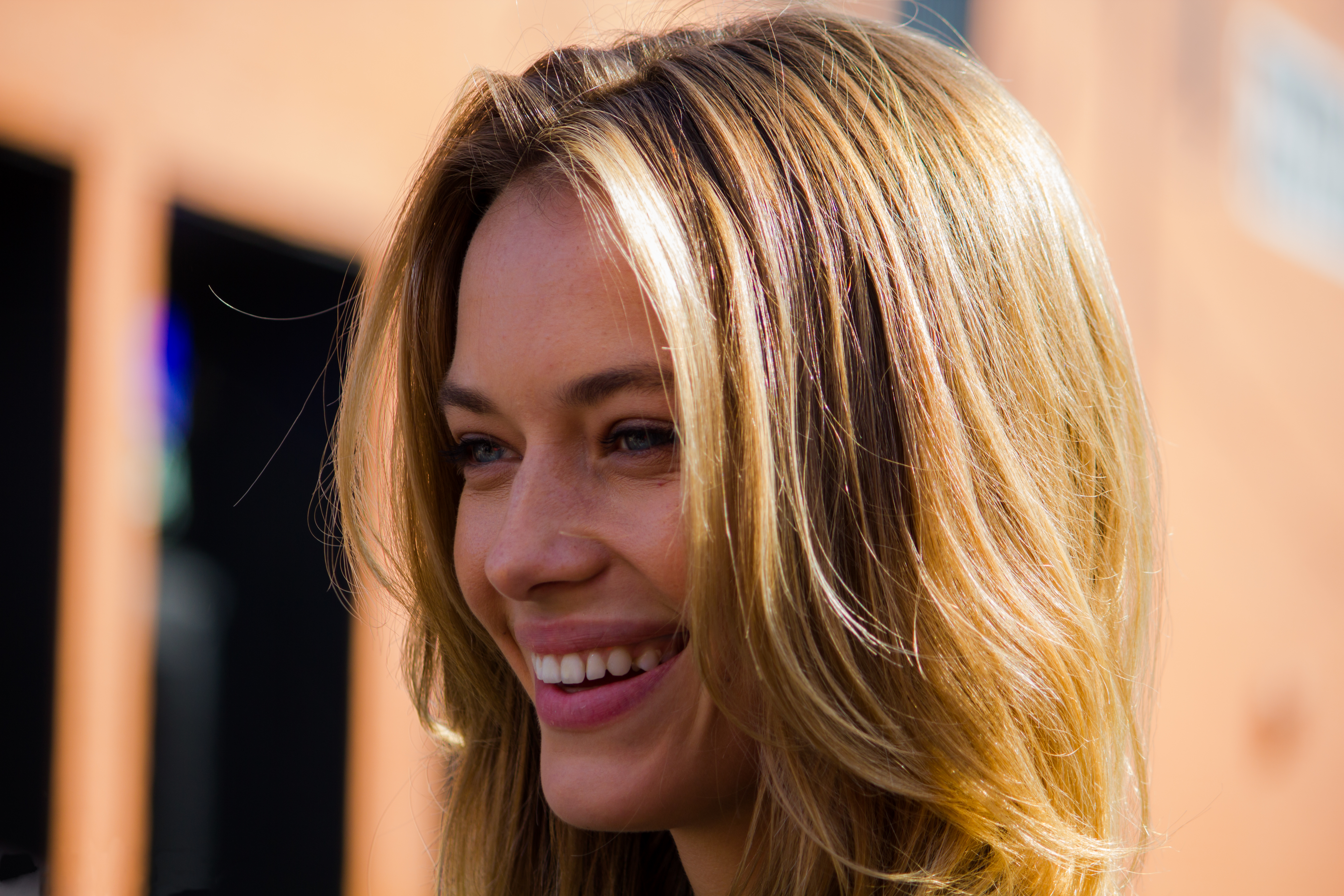
- Ferguson in February 2015
- Born: Hannah Emily Rose Ferguson; October 11, 1992 (age 33); San Angelo, Texas, U.S.
- Occupation: Model
- Years active: 2014–present
- Spouse: Imad Izemrane (m. 2022)
- Children: 1
- Modeling information
- Height: 1.77 m (5 ft 9 1/2 in)
- Hair color: Blonde
- Eye color: Blue
- Agency: IMG Worldwide

Hannah Emily Rose Ferguson (born October 11, 1992) is an American model.

== Early life ==
Ferguson's parents met while serving in the U.S. Marine Corps. She stated on the show Model Squad (2018) that her family "had financial struggles". The family went through a phase "without running water for 5 years". After graduating from high school, she won the Kim Dawson Model Search and moved to Dallas to start her career. After six months, she moved to New York City.

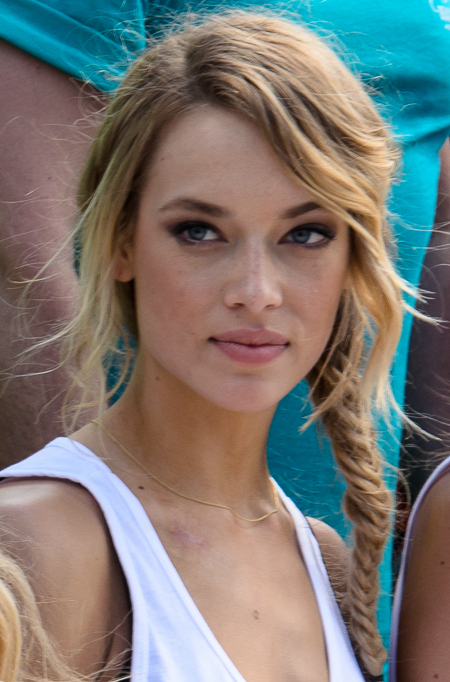
Ferguson in 2014

== Career ==
She has appeared in the 2014, 2015, 2016, and 2017 editions of the Sports Illustrated Swimsuit Issue. In her first appearance, she also posed in bodypaint by Joanne Gair. She has also been featured in magazines such as GQ. Ferguson appeared in advertising for Triumph International, and co-starred with Paris Hilton in a steamy TV commercial for Carl's Jr.

In 2017, Ferguson walked for Max Mara, Alberta Ferretti and Moschino at Milan Fashion Week and opening the 2018 Philipp Plein Resort show. In 2018, she walked for designers including Chloé, Dolce & Gabbana and Chanel. Ferguson also appeared in campaigns for Chanel Beauty and Jimmy Choo's Fever fragrance and was featured on the covers of Vogue Thailand, Elle (Brazil, Portugal), Harper's Bazaar Ukraine and Numéro Russia.

== Personal life ==
Hannah Ferguson married in November 2022 the businessman Imad Izemrane. On April 4, 2024, Ferguson gave birth to the couple's first son.
