= Zuri Tibby =

American model originally from Florida (born 1995)

- Born: September 1, 1995 (age 30); Florida, United States
- Occupation: Model
- Years active: 2012–present
- Known for: PINK
- Modeling information
- Height: 1.79 m (5 ft 10 1/2 in)
- Hair color: Black
- Eye color: Brown
- Agency: IMG Models (New York, Paris, London, Los Angeles); Why Not Model Management (Milan); Zodiac Management (Miami)

Zuri Alexis Tibby (born September 1, 1995) is an American model from Florida. She was discovered in a shopping mall at the age of 15. It was announced on August 24, 2016, that Tibby would become the first black model to be a spokesmodel for Victoria's Secret PINK.

Tibby also appeared in the PINK segment in the Victoria's Secret Fashion Show 2016 and the next year in the Victoria's Secret Fashion Show 2017.
