= 10 Magazine (British magazine) =

British luxury quarterly magazine

- Editor: Sophia Neophitou-Apostolou
- Categories: Fashion
- Frequency: Quarterly
- Publisher: ZAC Publishing
- Founder: Sophia Neophitou-Apostolou
- Founded: 2001
- Country: UK
- Based in: London
- Language: English
- Website: www.10magazine.com

10 Magazine is a British luxury quarterly magazine published in London, UK.

== History and profile ==
10 Magazine was founded in 2001 by Sophia Neophitou-Apostolou, who served as editor-in-chief. The magazine is published by ZAC Publishing on a quarterly basis. It covers fashion, contemporary art and beauty. However, it is considered a niche fashion magazine in comparison to similar magazines like Vogue and Vanity Fair.

Covers of 10 Magazine have featured Victoria Beckham, Debbie Harry and Noomi Rapace and covers of 10 Men have featured David Beckham, David Gandy and James Franco.

== Spin off ==
In 2003, 10 Magazine launched a second publication called 10 Men. The bi-annual magazine, which is also edited by Neophitou-Apostolou, focuses on male fashion, contemporary art, and male grooming and is printed in C4 format. In August 2015, 10 Men was revamped with a new design.

== Editors and editions ==
Country/region	Circulation dates	Editor-in-chief	Start year	End year
United Kingdom (10 Magazine)	2001–present	Sophia Neophitou-Apostolou	2001	present
Australia (10 Magazine)	2013–present	Alison Veness-McGourty	2013	present
United States (10 Magazine USA)	2023–present	Dora Fung	2023	present
Japan (10 Magazine Japan)	2024–present	Saori Masuda	2024	present
Germany (10 Magazine DE)	2025–present	Toby Grimditch	2025	present
