= The Elder Statesman =

The Elder Statesman may refer to:

- The Elder Statesman (play), a play in verse by T. S. Eliot
- The Elder Statesman (brand), a luxury clothing, fashion and lifestyle brand
