= Manel Torres =

Spanish fashion designer

Manel Torres is a Spanish fashion designer and inventor of the spray-on fabric Fabrican.

== Early life and education ==
Torres was born in the Catalan region near Barcelona, Spain. He studied fashion design at the Escuela de Artes y Técnicas de la Moda (EATM) in Barcelona and the Winchester School of Art in the United Kingdom before pursuing postgraduate studies at the Royal College of Art, where he earned a Master's degree in Womenswear Design.

After a brief stint in the fashion industry in India, he returned to London to undertake a PhD at the Royal College of Art, in collaboration with Imperial College London. There, his doctoral research focused on developing innovative textile materials and accelerating traditional garment production methods, which ultimately led to the invention of spray-on fabric technology.

== Career ==
In 2003, Torres founded Fabrican Ltd, a research and innovation company utilising his patented spray-on fabric technology.

Torres has delivered TEDx talks in London and Vienna discussing this intersection of science and fashion.

Torres and Fabrican gained international attention when the material was showcased at the "Science in Style" show during London Fashion Week in 2010 featuring spray-on dresses inspired by Victorian crinolines and iconic architecture.

In 2022, Torres sprayed a dress directly onto supermodel Bella Hadid as she stood on stage in her underwear at Paris Fashion Week for the finale of the Coperni Spring 2023 show, creating a viral moment shared worldwide.

Torres continues to work on research and development for Fabrican's spray-on fabric and is an influence in discussions on sustainable fashion, rapid manufacturing and the future of wearable materials.
