= Richard Stark (disambiguation) =

Rick or Richard Stark may refer to:

- Richard Stark, most frequent pen name of American novelist and screenwriter Donald E. Westlake (1933–2008)
- Richard Stark (designer) (born 1960), American fashion designer and co-founder of Chrome Hearts
- Rick Stark (born 1962), American Democratic state representative from Florida

== See also ==
- Stark Ritchie (1916–2001), American football player during 1930s, attorney and lobbyist
- Richard Starke (born 1960), Canadian member of Legislative Assembly of Alberta
- Richard Starks (born 1990), American WWE wrestler, ring name Ricky Saints
