= Jesse Jo Stark =

American singer-songwriter

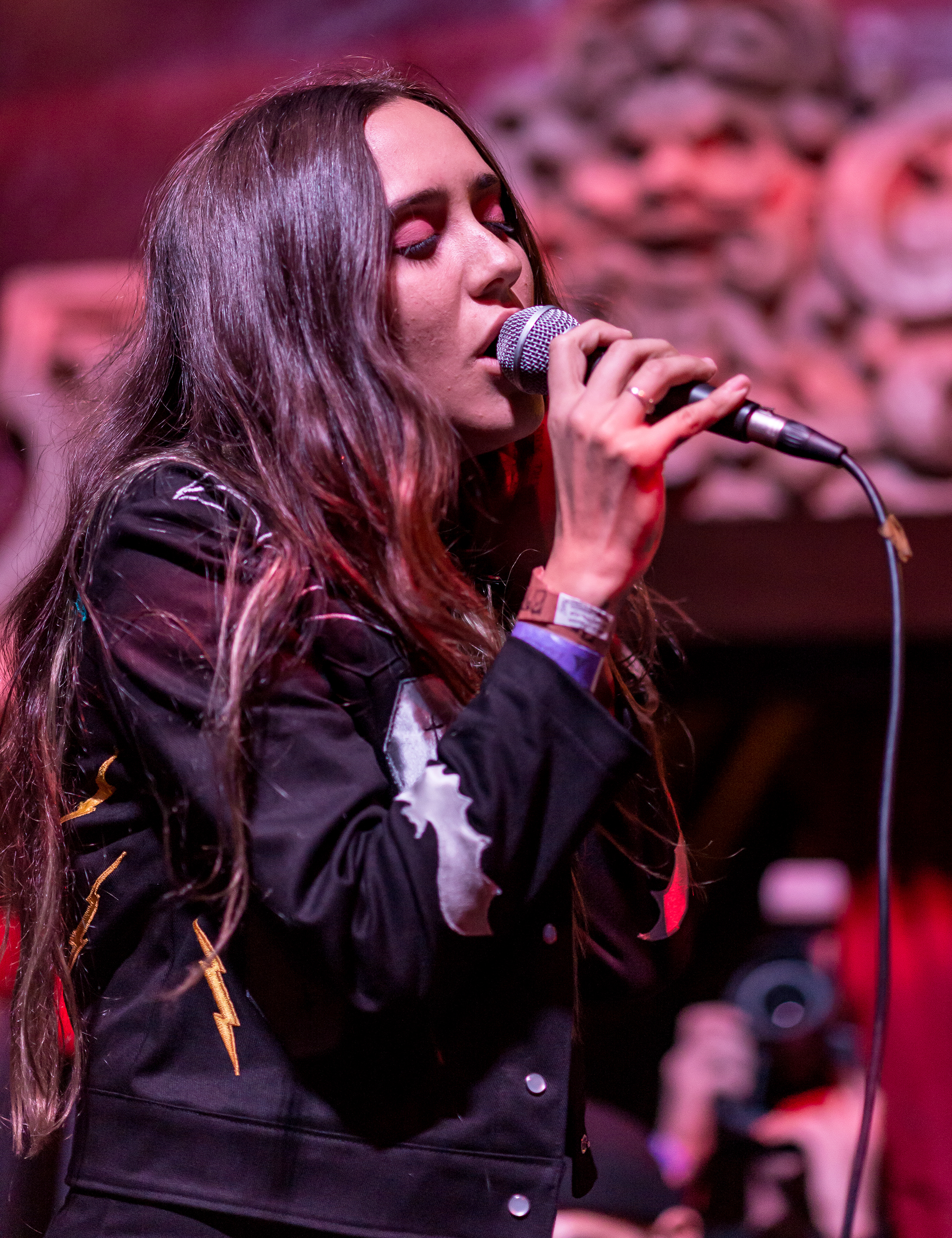
- Stark in 2017
- Born: April 4, 1991 (age 35); California, U.S.
- Occupations: Singer; songwriter; actress
- Years active: 2017–Present
- Partner: Yungblud (2020–present)
- Musical career
- Genres: Indie; indie rock; alternative pop; pop
- Instrument: Vocals
- Labels: Sugar Jones Music; Jesse Jo Stark
- Website: jessejostark.com

Jesse Jo Stark (born April 4, 1991) is an American singer and actress from Los Angeles, California.

== Early life ==
Stark was born to Laurie Lynn Stark and Richard Stark, the founder of Chrome Hearts. She has two younger siblings, Kristian Jack Stark and Frankie Belle Stark.

== Career ==
Stark performing live in 2018

Stark released her first EP in 2014, titled Down Your Drain. In 2018, she released her second EP, Dandelion. In 2019, she released the single "Lady Bird". Stark released her debut full-length album in 2022, Doomed. The album was produced by Jesse Rutherford and Michael Harris. Alongside the album's release, Stark released a music video for the song "Lipstick".

== Personal life ==
Stark resides in Los Angeles, California, where she works as the creative director for the luxury brand Chrome Hearts and maintains a local homestead. Stark is also a long-time personal associate of fashion model Bella Hadid.

In 2020, Stark began a relationship with English alternative rock musician Yungblud (Dominic Harrison). Despite navigating a brief public separation due to career pressures, the couple subsequently reconciled and continue to collaborate on music projects. Stark's godmother is the singer Cher.

== Discography ==
=== Studio albums ===
Title	Album details
Doomed	Released: September 21, 2022; Label: Sugar Jones Music; Formats: Vinyl, digital download, streaming
MUSE	Released: November 6, 2026; Label: BMG Rights Management (US) LLC; Formats: Digital download, streaming

=== Extended plays ===
Title	EP details
Down Your Drain	Released: 2014; Label: Sugar Jones Music; Formats: 12" vinyl
Dandelion	Released: 2018; Label: Sugar Jones Music; Formats: 12" vinyl, streaming
A Pretty Place to Fall Apart	Released: 2021; Label: Sugar Jones Music; Formats: Digital download, streaming

=== Singles ===
==== As lead artist ====
- "Driftwood" (2017)
- "April Flowers" (2017)
- "Deadly Doll" (2017)
- "Fire of Love" (2018)
- "Wish I Was Dead" (2018)
- "Mystery" (2018)
- "Lady Bird" (2019)
- "Tangerine" (2020)
- "Die Young" (2020)
- "Cry On Me" (2021)
- "Fallout" (2023)
- "Skeleton" (2024)
- "Billie Don't Be So Mad" (2024)
- "I'm Yours" (2024)
- "Grim Reaper" (2025)
- "Who Knew" (with Lil Yachty) (2025)

==== As featured artist ====
- "Sweetheart" (Seb Torgus featuring Jesse Jo Stark) (2023)
- "Vampire in Beverly Hills" (Eyedress featuring Jesse Jo Stark) (2024)
- "Stoner" (Eyedress featuring Jesse Jo Stark) (2025)

=== Singles ===
Title	Year	Ref
"Driftwood"	2017	
"April Flowers"	2017	
"Deadly Doll"	2017	
"Fire of Love"	2018	
"Wish I Was Dead"	2018	
"Mystery"	2018	
"Lady Bird"	2019	
"Angel from Montgomery"	2020	
"Tangerine"	2020	
"Die Young"	2020	
"Cry On Me"	2021	
"Fallout"	2023	
"Skeleton"	2024	

== Filmography ==
=== Film and television ===
List of acting performances
Year	Title	Role	Notes	Ref.
2013	Palo Alto	Jesse	Feature film	
2021	Fracture	Mya	Miniseries (Lead role; 5 episodes)	
2025	Who Knew	Herself	Short film (with Lil Yachty)	
