= Chrome Hearts =

Luxury brand from Hollywood

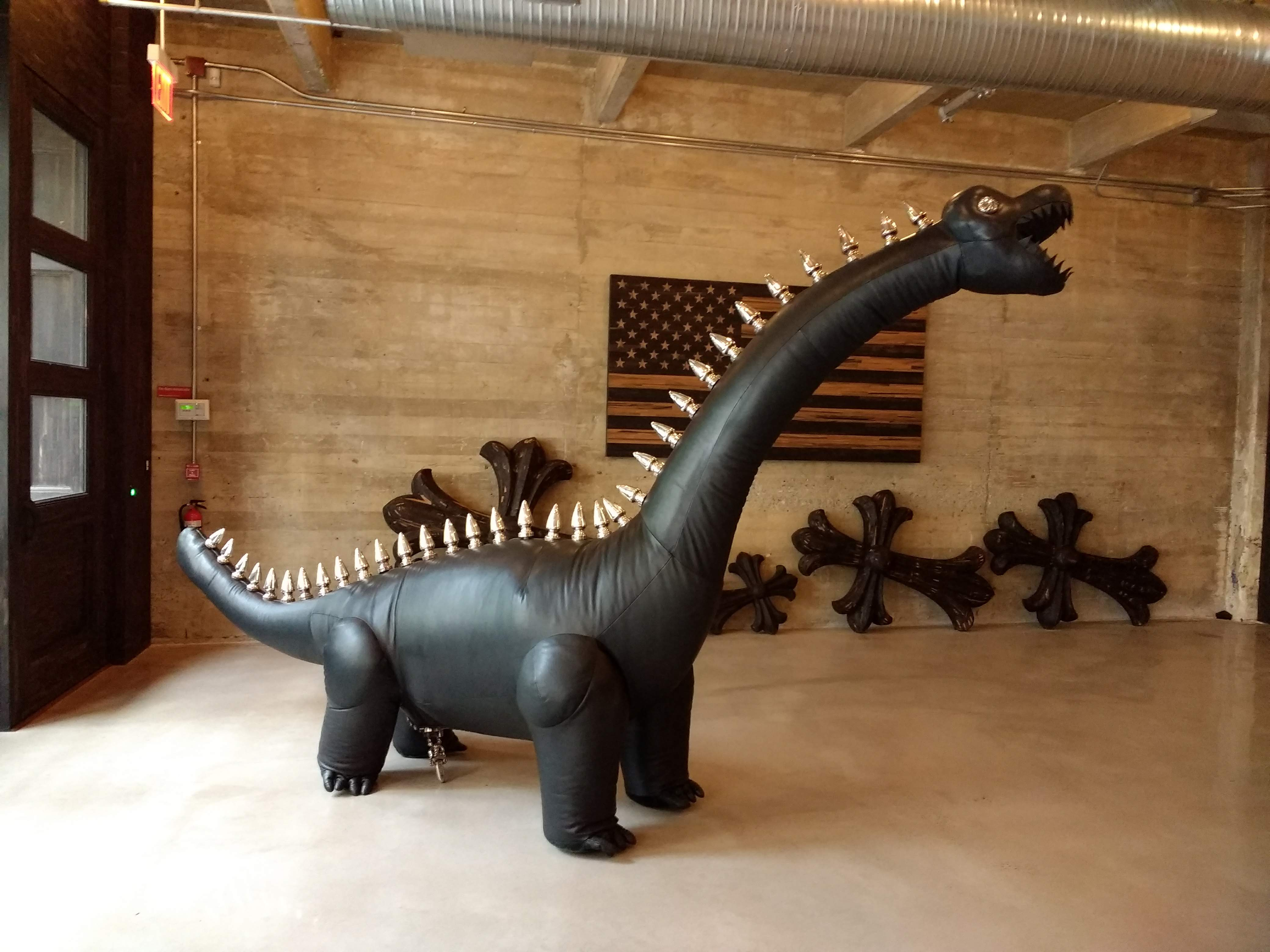
- Chrome Hearts Store in West Village, New York City.
- Type: Private company
- Industry: Luxury goods; Fashion
- Founded: 1988
- Founders: Richard Stark; Leonard Kamhout; John Bowman
- Headquarters: Hollywood, Los Angeles, US
- Area served: China; England; France; Hong Kong; Japan; Saint Barthélemy; South Korea; Taiwan; United States
- Key people: Laurie Lynn Stark; Jesse Jo
- Products: Clothing; accessories; jewellery; furniture; leather; eyewear; fragrances
- Website: Chrome Hearts

Chrome Hearts is a luxury brand from Hollywood, Los Angeles, primarily producing silver, gold, and diamond accessories, alongside eyewear, leather items, apparel, furniture, kitchenware, and miscellaneous other items, using leather, silver, and ebony.

It was founded in 1988 by Richard Stark, Leonard Kamhout and John Bowman. Today, it is co-owned by Richard Stark and his wife Laurie Lynn Stark. Its logo contains a cross with the brand name around it on a circular ribbon. Production of silver, gold and diamond accessories, alongside most clothing, leather goods and furniture occurs in Hollywood with eyewear primarily produced in Japan and their fragrance collection in France. As of 2021, they have over 1,000 staff at their Los Angeles production site. Although not disclosed by Chrome Hearts, the brand is estimated to be worth around $985 million.

== History ==
Richard Stark and John Bowman started the business in a Los Angeles garage in early 1988. Bowman was a manufacturer of leather goods, while Stark merchandised top grade raw leathers. They initially established the label in order to produce leather jackets that weren't available on the market. The third partner was master sterling silver jeweller Leonard Kamhout. The company's first task was a costume design for Chopper Chicks in Zombietown, co-starring the girlfriend of Steve Jones, the lead guitarist of the Sex Pistols; While some accounts suggest Stark took the name of the brand from the working title of the movie, this was contradicted by Richard in a handwritten note detailing his early life which was published in a photography book in Japan, 1997; 'October 1998 - One sedated eve, my favourite design was conceived - I called it Chrome Hearts'. In 1992, the brand was awarded Accessory Designer Award of the Year by the CFDA. In 1994, Stark, Bowman, and Kamhout had a falling-out, and Bowman and Kamhout withdrew from the brand. Since 1994, Chrome Hearts has been co-owned by Richard Stark and his wife, Laurie Lynn Stark.

In 1996, the first Chrome Hearts flagship boutique opened at 159 East 64th Street, Manhattan, New York City. In 1991, the famous Maxfield Boutique would stock some early hardware items from the brand. In 1999, a second boutique opened in Minami-Aoyama, Tokyo. In 2000, Richard Stark collaborated with Tommy Perse, owner of Maxfield, and architect Mark Steele to build a third boutique in West Hollywood, California. In 2003, Chrome Hearts opened a boutique at Prince's Building, Hong Kong.

In the early 2000s, Chrome Hearts began publishing its own fashion magazine, which featured interviews and celebrity photoshoots, many of which were shot by Laurie Lynn Stark. It was published until 2017.

In April 2020, Chrome Hearts sued clothing brand MNML for using their trademark cross symbol on jeans. In 2023, they pushed further suing Fashion Nova and Shein for infringement on their signature motifs.

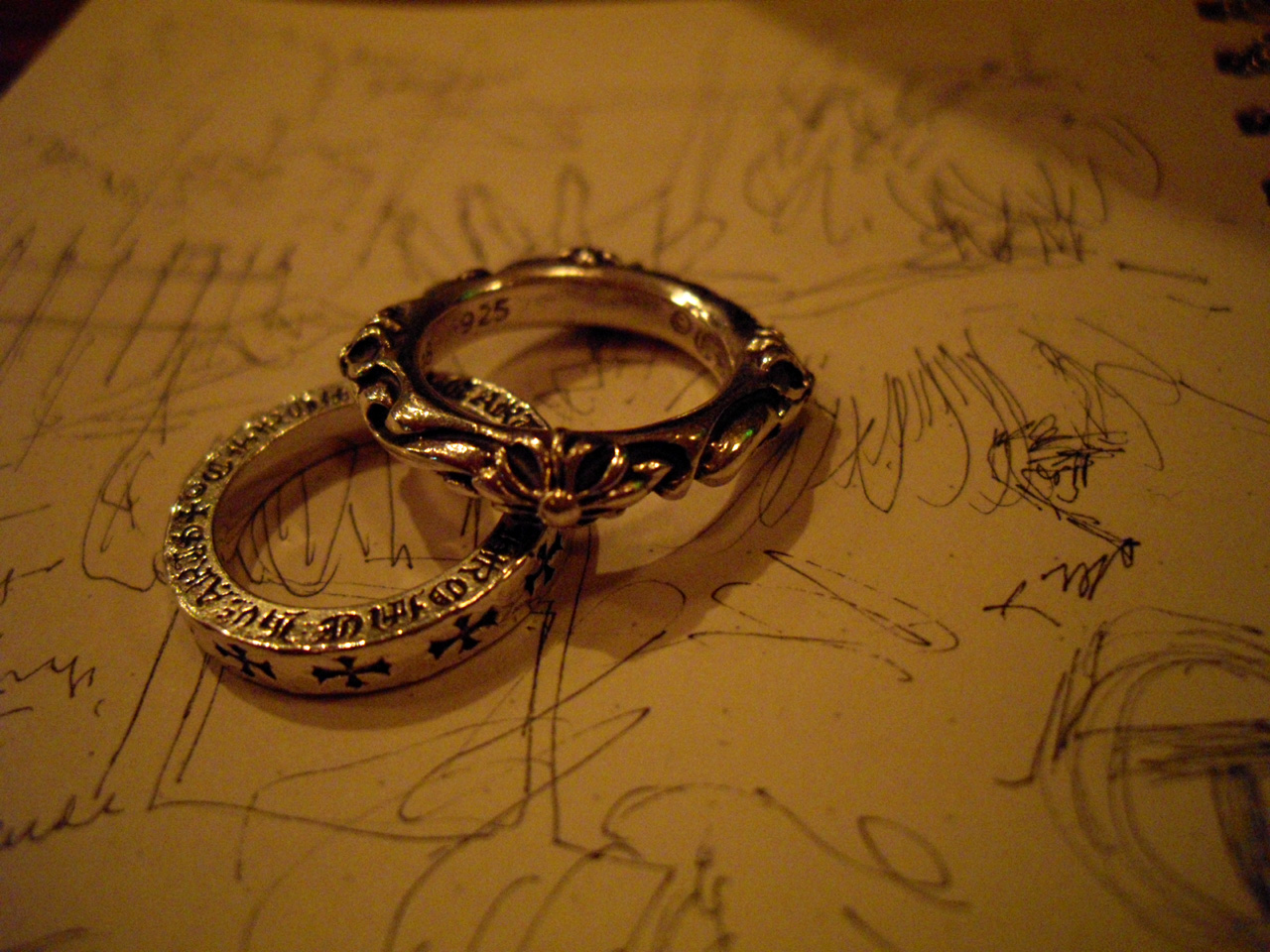
Chrome Hearts rings

== Goods and products ==
Chrome Hearts is primarily recognized for its clothing, accessories, furniture, leather products, and eyewear. Majority of their products are produced in their Hollywood production factory.

In July 2019, they introduced their first fragrance collection, based on two scents, featuring products such as incense and eau de parfum. At launch, the collection was exclusive to Selfridges in London. While Selfridges was an authorised retailer of the brand pre-2019, the launch marked the opening of a permanent store inside the shop.

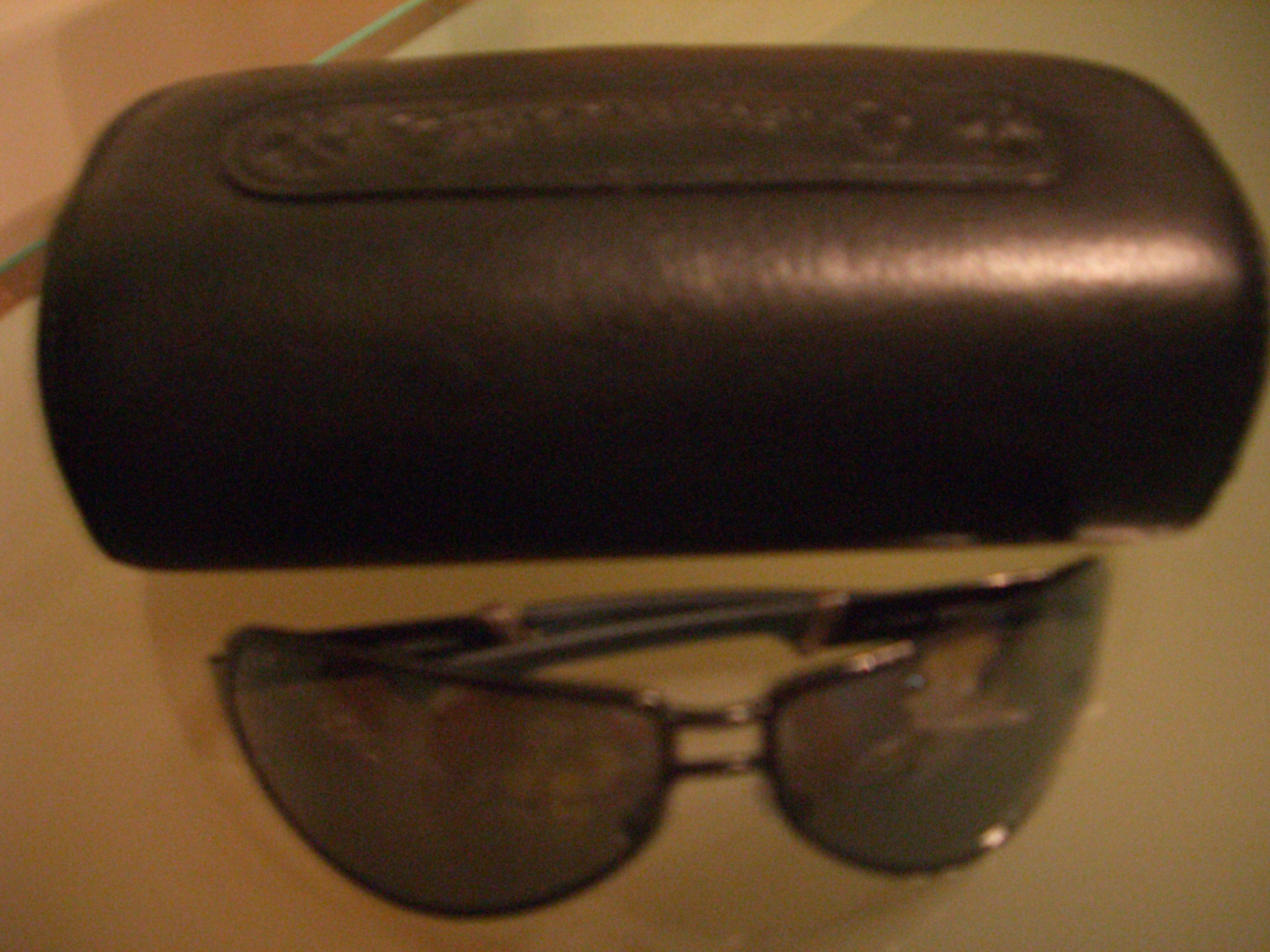
Chrome Hearts sunglasses

== Collaborations ==
In 2002, Chrome Hearts introduced a collaboration with the Rolling Stones featuring the band's iconic "Lips and Tongue" motif.

In 2007, Japanese fashion brand Comme des Garçons collaborated with Chrome Hearts on a series of pendants and garments. Prior to this, in the 90s, Rei Kawakubo from Comme des Garçons had already worked with the brand by displaying their products in the Aoyama flagship store.

In 2009, fashion brand BAPE (A Bathing Ape) collaborated with them on a series of t-shirts including the 12-piece limited edition Chrome Hearts X BABY MILO.

In 2010, they partnered on shoe design with the Robert Mapplethorpe Foundation, and Rick Owens. The shoes are adorned with various silver embellishments. In 2010, they collaborated with Owens on jewelry and sneakers which were unveiled at Paris Fashion Week.

In June 2013, Chrome Hearts partnered with the K-pop girl group 2NE1 for a limited collection to celebrate the launch of the brand in South Korea with department store Shinsegae.

In March 2014, Chrome Hearts bought a minority stake in high-end knitwear brand the Elder Statesman. The firm employed its hallmark silver accents in a customization of the iconic Adidas Stan Smith in early 2016.

In November 2014, Chrome Hearts opened their Miami boutique, with a Fahey/Klein Gallery on the second floor that showcased photographs from the 20th century by various photographers. Additionally, the boutique displayed artworks by Los Angeles artist Matt DiGiacomo and photographs from the Robert Mapplethorpe Estate. A store for the luxury fashion brand The Elder Statesman and another branch of David's Cafe, a Cuban café in Miami, was also built within the boutique.

In December 2015, Ladurée worked with Chrome Hearts and opened a macaron and tea café on the ground floor of Chrome Hearts' Miami store. The café also sold a collectible macaron box. On the second floor, they collaborated with Sean Kelly Gallery to display artworks by artists such as Mariko Mori.

Chrome Hearts has had multiple collaborations with Virgil Abloh from Off-White. In 2015 and 2016, they collaborated on capsule collections, with the latter primarily consisting of t-shirts. In 2018, they released a hoodie and another collection. In 2019, Abloh, alongside Louis Vuitton, hosted a fashion show at their New York branch.

Bella Hadid used to visit the factory in LA as a teenager and collaborated with the brand on a 40-piece apparel and accessories collection released in 2017. The Chrome Hearts x Bella collection debuted at Paris Fashion Week, and is sold exclusively at Selfridges. Bella's sister Gigi Hadid has modeled for the brand. It has had a few collaborations with Bella Hadid since then, including the release of an eyewear collection and also tie-dye t-shirts, for a Feeding America fundraiser during the COVID-19 pandemic. These 49 t-shirts were hand-dyed by Bella Hadid, released in three different styles and sold for $260 each with all of the proceeds given to the fundraiser.

In 2020, Drake collaborated with Chrome Hearts for his Rolls-Royce Cullinan, which included a customized hood ornament, air conditioning knob and rims. It was displayed at the Miami Institute of Contemporary Art for 1 week. They also worked with Snapchat's Lens Studio to display an augmented reality version of the Rolls-Royce. In May 2021, they worked together again to release a collection to promote Drake's album Certified Lover Boy. This collection was limited and was exclusively sold in Chrome Hearts' Miami store.

In June 2021, Chrome Hearts and Baccarat co-produced a decanter and tumbler set, featuring Chrome Hearts' Pyramid Plus design.

In late 2025, Chrome Hearts once again collaborated with Drake, alongside his brand Nocta and the American athletic equipment company Nike, releasing a collection of 'real-tree' camouflage patterned t-shirts, sweatshirts, hoodies and a puffer jacket. The collection also included Air Force 1s, modified with .925 sterling silver hardware in Chrome Hearts' signature style.

== Locations ==
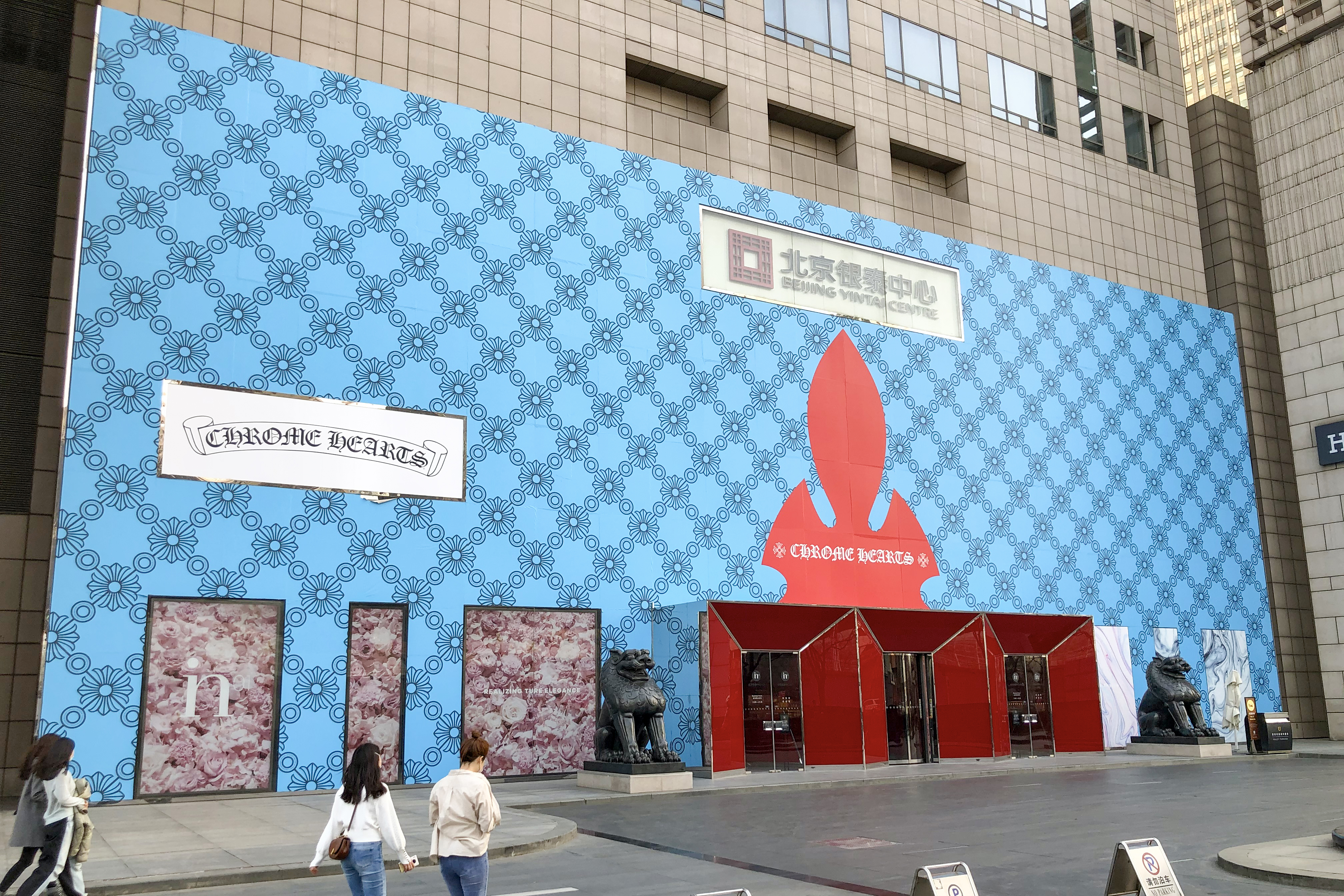
Chrome Hearts boutique at the Beijing Yintai Centre

There are Chrome Hearts boutiques in:

- Americas: New York City, Los Angeles, Malibu, Las Vegas, Honolulu, Miami, Aspen, St. Barth
- Asia: Tokyo, Nagoya, Fukuoka, Kobe, Hong Kong, Taipei, Seoul, Busan, Beijing, Hangzhou, Chengdu
- Europe: Paris, Cannes, London, Manchester

Each Chrome Hearts boutique has a diversity of both interior design and exclusive clothing products. Chrome Hearts is sold in luxury malls such as Bergdorf Goodman, Isetan, Prince's Building and Selfridges. In 2018 and 2021, the brand opened a pop-up store in New York for the Sex Records collection, which included products such as customised clothing and toy cars.

In late 2025, Chrome Hearts silently acquired the Surfrider Hotel in Malibu, a 20-room boutique hotel on the Pacific Coast Highway. Originally built in 1953 as a motel, then later redesigned into a high-end boutique, the sale was finalised for roughly $37.5 million, working out to be one of the most expensive per-room hotel deals in California. The acquisition marks their official entry into hotels, moving beyond fashion and jewellery. As of April 2026, no work has begun and little is known of the project.

== Awards and honours ==
In 1992, Chrome Hearts won the Council of Fashion Designers of America Accessories Designer of the Year award. In 2022, Richard and Laurie Lynn Stark received the CFDA Geoffrey Beene Lifetime Achievement Award.
