= Spray-on condom =

2006 German contraceptive prototype

A prototype spray-on condom (German: Sprühkondom) was invented by Jan Vinzenz Krause of the Institute for Condom Consultancy in 2006. The idea was inspired by the mechanics of a drive-through car wash—the penis was inserted into a chamber where nozzles apply a coat of fast-drying liquid latex. The process took close to a minute, a restriction that has kept the product off the market. The product was expected to cost around twice as much as a traditional condom. Prototypes consisted of an application chamber and a cartridge of liquid that produces around 20 condoms, depending on penis size.

Besides being attractive to some because of its novelty, the spray-on condom was intended to solve several problems. The product's proponents hoped that consumers would find it easier to apply and use correctly than a traditional condom. Because it is easier to operate correctly, the device's inventor hoped that the condom would be more successful in preventing unwanted pregnancy and STD transmission. Because the condom uses the penis as a mould for its creation, it could be especially attractive to men with unusually sized or oddly shaped penises.

== Development and issues ==
The product had several problems. In testing, some men found it intimidating, and were not willing to insert their penis into the device, opting to test it on their finger instead. The applicator emitted a loud hissing sound upon use, potentially "killing the mood", and the latex did not form a reservoir tip. The biggest problem, however, was that the drying process took 2–3 minutes before the condom was dry enough to use, which was too long to be truly marketable.

By 2008, the idea had not been developed further.

== See also ==
- Fabrican
