= Silly String =

Toy and practical joke device

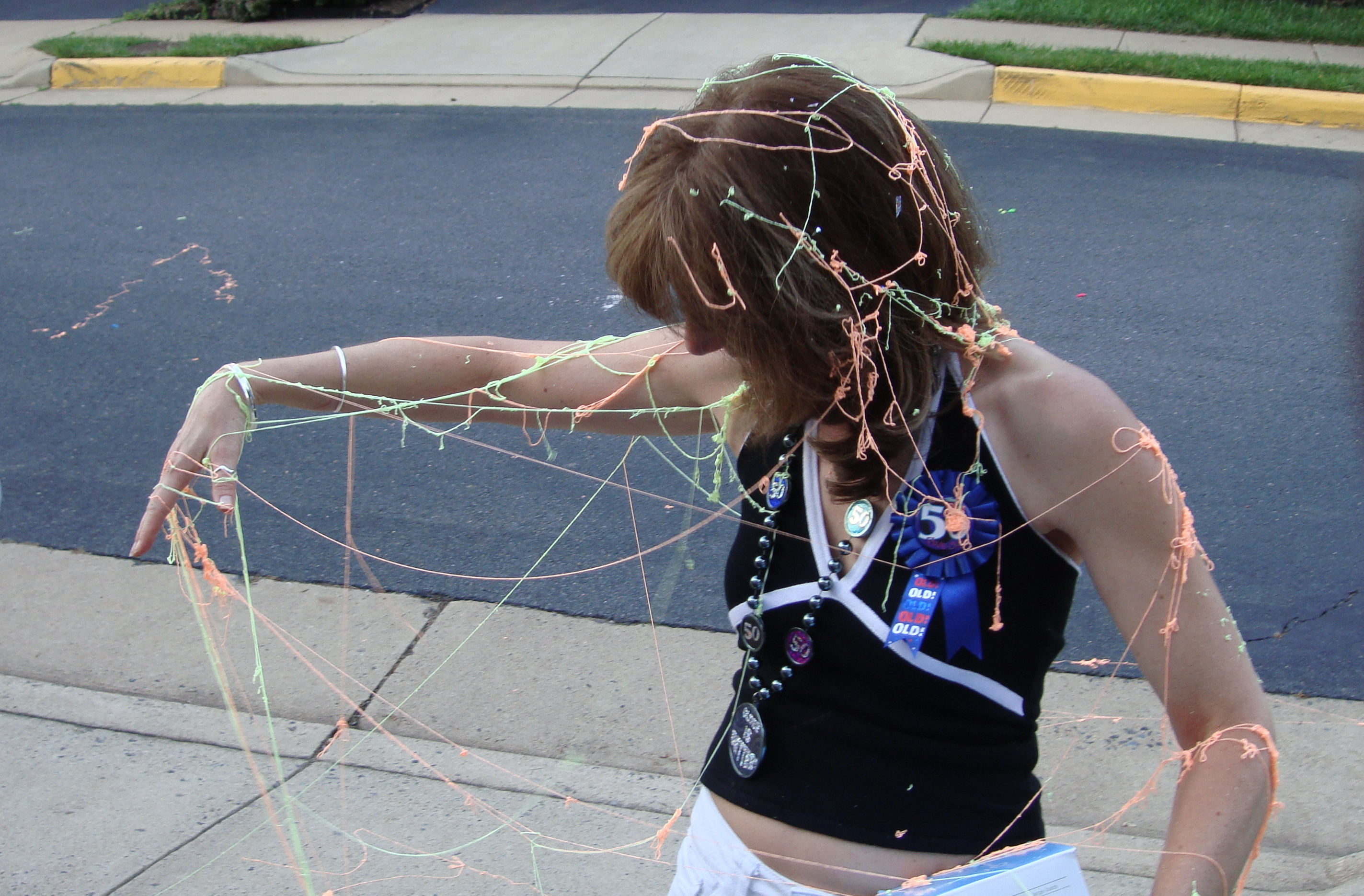
A person who has been sprayed with Silly String

Silly String (generically known as aerosol string) is a toy of flexible, sometimes brightly colored, plastic string propelled as a stream of liquid from an aerosol can. The solvent in the string quickly evaporates in mid-air, creating a continuous strand. Silly String is sometimes used during weddings, birthday parties, carnivals and other festive occasions, and has also been used by the U.S. military to detect tripwires.

== Composition ==
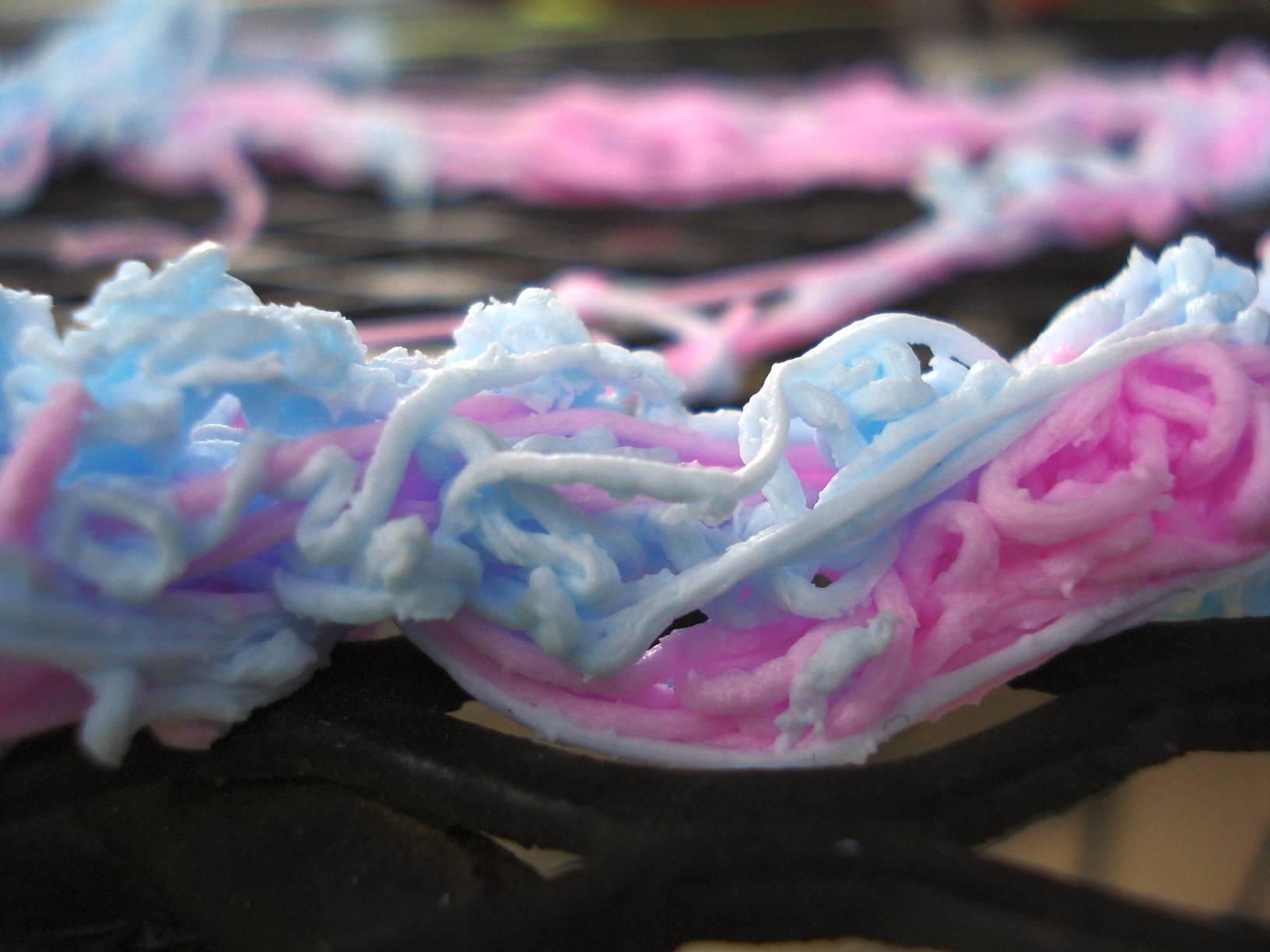
Blue and pink Silly String

Silly String is made of a mixture of components dispersed throughout a liquid solvent in the product's aerosol can. These substances include a polymer resin that provides the string's structure, a plasticizer to tune the physical properties of the string, and a surfactant that promotes foaming of the product. Other ingredients include silicone fluid (to make the strands easier to clean up), flame retardant, and a pigment for color.

Key components in Silly String are the aerosol spray can and the propellant that ejects the product mixture from the can. The product originally used chlorofluorocarbon propellant Freon 12 mixed with Freon 11, both part of a group of compounds that damage the ozone layer. However, since the United States banned the use of CFCs like Freon 11 and 12 in aerosol cans, the manufacturers then changed the formulation to use permitted propellants. Aerosol propellants are liquids with very low boiling points. When under pressure inside the can, the propellant is in liquid form, but when the nozzle is opened, it rapidly escapes – along with the compounds mixed in it – and evaporates as it enters the air. The string takes shape as the propellant evaporates.

The product forms a string that holds itself together while remaining slightly sticky to the touch. This allows the product to weakly adhere to people and windows, for instance, but can easily be cleaned up without the string falling apart or staining inert surfaces.

The current formulation is not published, but one of the primary recipes in the original patent calls for 12.2% of the synthetic resin poly(isobutyl methacrylate) by weight. It additionally calls for 0.5% of the selected plasticizer, dibutyl phthalate, 2.5% of sorbitan trioleate surfactant, 0.35% silicone fluid such as dimethyl siloxane or methyl phenyl siloxane, 5.6% of flame retardant hexabromobenzene, and 2–3% pigment (all percentages by weight). The aerosol propellant represents the bulk of the product. Solubility of the resin and other materials in the product is enhanced by addition of another solvent, originally Freon 11, in 6.6% by weight.

== History ==
The invention of the original silly string was accidental. In 1972, a United States Patent was issued to Leonard A. Fish, an inventor, and Robert P. Cox, a chemist, for a "foamable resinous composition". The partners initially wanted to create a can of aerosol that one would be able to spray on a broken/sprained leg or arm and use as an instant cast. Their invention worked, but the pair had to test 500 different types of nozzles. After testing about 30 or 40, Fish came upon one that produced a nice string, which shot about 30 feet across the room. This incident inspired Fish to turn the product into a toy. After altering the formula to be less sticky and adding colors, the pair decided to market their product.

Because neither of them knew how to sell toys, they made an appointment with Wham-O. Fish described how, during that meeting, he sprayed the can all over the person he was meeting with and all over his office. This person became very upset and asked him to leave the premises. One day later, Fish received a telegram asking him to send 24 cans of "Squibbly" for a market test immediately, signed by the same individual who had kicked him out. He called them back and explained that, after he had finished cleaning up his office, the two owners of Wham-O had come back to talk to him, and one had noticed a piece of the string on a lampshade he had overlooked while cleaning up. He explained where the string came from and the owners quickly asked him to send samples over for a market test. Two weeks later, Wham-O signed a contract with Fish and Cox to license the product, which became known as Silly String.

Silly String was licensed to and produced by Wham-O, in a range of colors including blue, red and green, until the Car-Freshner Corporation, the maker of Little Trees, acquired the Silly String trademark in 1997. Silly String Products, a division of Car-Freshner Corporation, manufactures Silly String in the United States and distributes Silly String in North America. The U.S. Patent #3705669 includes a description of preferred implementations. Similar toys are Goofy String, Streamer String, Wacky String, and Nickelodeon Smatter.

== Safety ==
In December 2006, Tween Brands Inc., a retailer of girls' clothing and accessories in the United States, was fined $109,800 by the United States Environmental Protection Agency for "allegedly distributing canned confetti string damaging to the ozone". EPA said that the product marketed under various names by the retailer damages the stratospheric ozone layer. The production and use of chemicals harmful to that layer is controlled by U.S. federal law.

== Military use ==
Silly String and similar products have been used by the military to detect tripwires for explosive booby traps. The string is sprayed in the air over the area, revealing hidden tripwires by catching on them as it falls. The string is light enough that it does not break the wires and trigger the explosive.

The military applications of Silly String were first discovered by Sergeant First Class David B. Chandler, Chief Instructor of the United States Army's Sapper Leader Course, in 1993. In 2006, it was being used by U.S. troops during the Iraq War for tripwire detection. However, because the material is an aerosol, it could not be shipped privately to Iraq and is not provided by official channels. Thus, 80,000 cans were unintentionally stockpiled in New Jersey. In October 2007, a shipping company with the required credentials was able to send the silly string overseas.

== Bans in the US ==
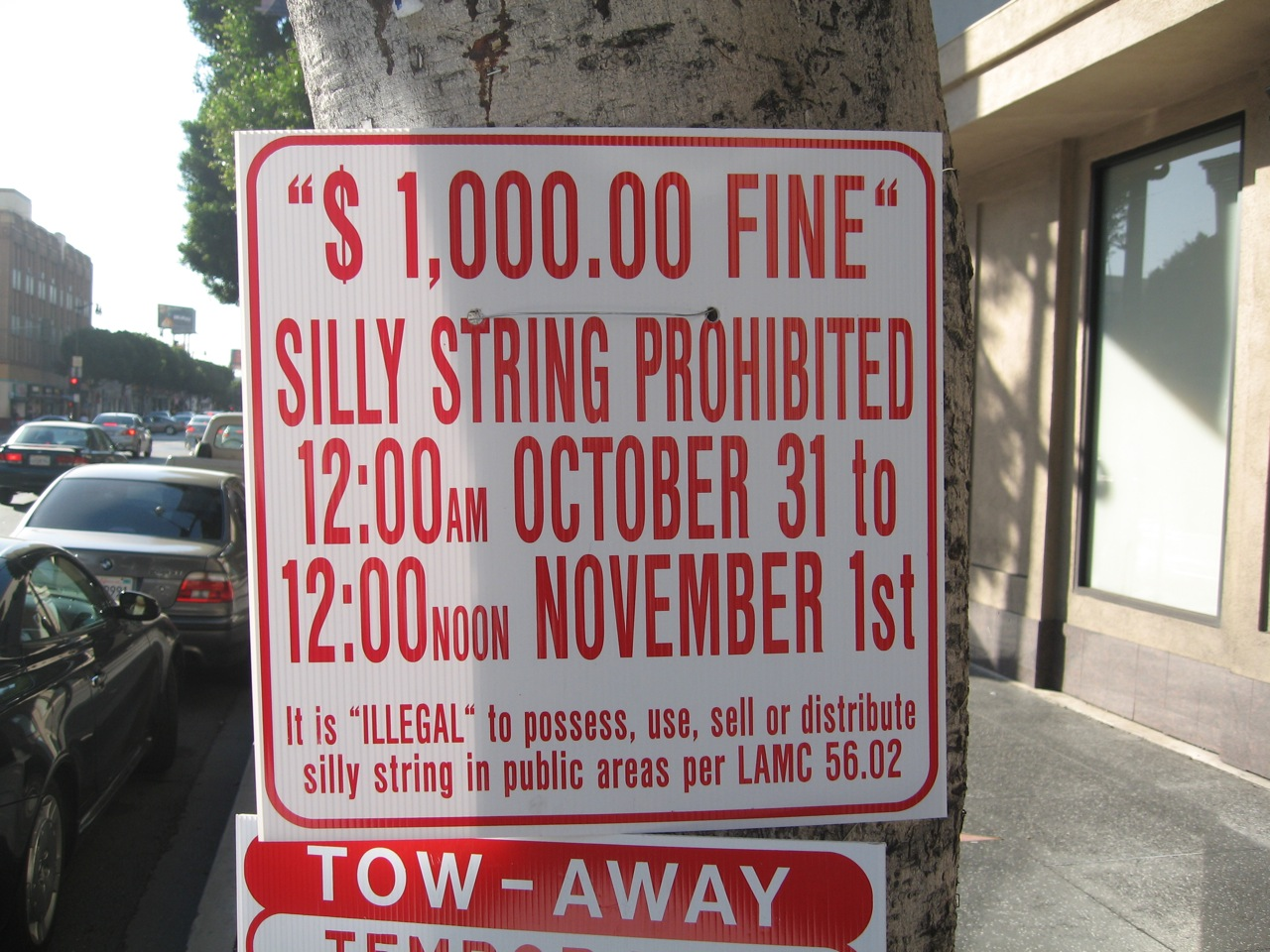
Sign in Los Angeles prohibiting the use of Silly String on Halloween night, punishable by a $1,000 fine

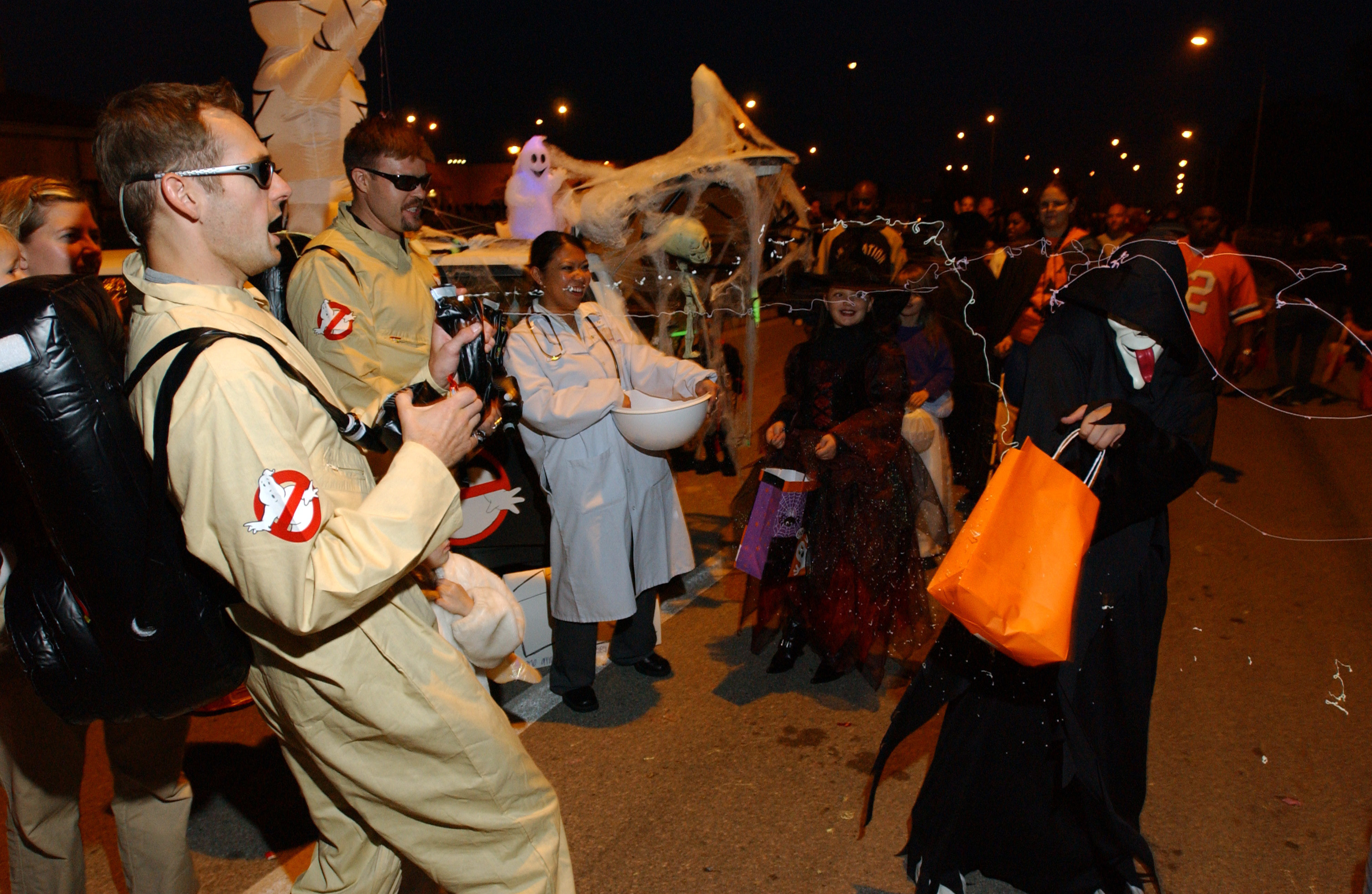
Halloween revelers spray each other with Silly String.

The use of aerosol string products has been banned in some places for various reasons, including cleanup and removal costs and the potential of damages to house or vehicle paint.

It has been banned in Ridgewood, New Jersey, and a number of other places, and also at some public gatherings and events. The town board of Huntington on Long Island banned the sale of Silly String within 1,500 feet (460 m) of the route of a parade. In the 1980s, the town of Marlborough, Massachusetts, banned "any instrument or product designed to project a string or streamer of plastic material", supposedly after the paintwork on some police cruisers was damaged; offenders are said to risk a fine of up to $200.

In 2004, Los Angeles enacted a city ordinance (LAMC Section 56.02) to ban aerosol string in Hollywood on Halloween night.

== See also ==
- Fabrican
