= Spray-on clothing =

Spray-on clothing is a form of clothing, that is applied by spraying polymer over the body in such a manner that it appears as clothing. It is a polymer mix that dries relatively quickly.

On September 15, 2010, Ian Sample, The Guardian's Science correspondent reported on a press conference where Dr Manuel Torres showed a spray-on clothing product named Fabrican. Covering the same announcement Prita Ganapati, writing for Wired magazine referred to the result as "spray-on fabric". The Guardian referred to both "spray-on bandages" and "spray-on fabric". Scientific American referred to both "spray-on clothing" and "spray-on clothes". Torres described the fabric as similar to felt.
