= Bella Hadid =

American fashion model (born 1996)

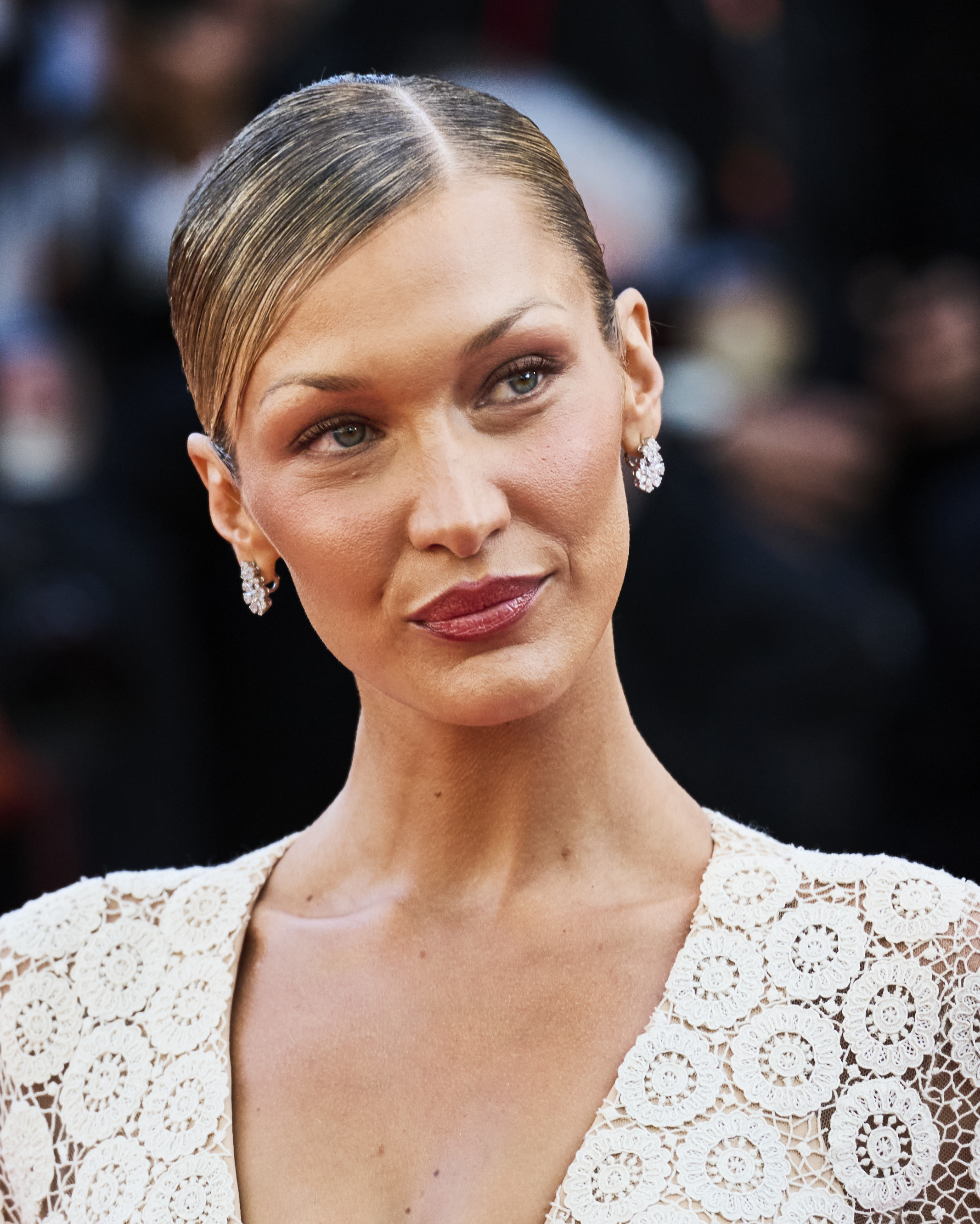
- Hadid in 2026
- Born: Isabella Khair Hadid; October 9, 1996 (age 30); Washington, D.C., U.S.
- Occupation: Model
- Years active: 2012–present
- Parents: Mohamed Hadid (father); Yolanda Hadid (mother)
- Relatives: Gigi Hadid (sister)
- Modeling information
- Height: 5 ft 8 1/2 in (1.74 m)
- Hair color: Blonde
- Eye color: Blue-green
- Agency: IMG Models

Isabella Khair Hadid (/həˈdiːd/ hə-DEED; born October 9, 1996) is an American fashion model. In 2022, she was named Model of the Year by the British Fashion Council. Throughout her career, Hadid has appeared on the covers of numerous international editions of Vogue. Time magazine named her one of the 100 most influential people in the world on its annual list in 2023.

Hadid began her modeling career aged 16. She was signed to IMG Models in August 2014, and made her New York Fashion Week debut the following month. In 2016, she was voted "Model of the Year" by industry professionals for Models.com. In 2017, Hadid broke Doutzen Kroes's record for the most Vogue September covers in one year by appearing in five international editions. As of 2023, Hadid was one of the world's highest paid models, earning $19 million.

== Early life ==
Hadid was born on October 9, 1996, in Washington, D.C., and raised in Southern California. Her father, Mohamed Hadid, is a Palestinian-American real-estate developer, while her mother, Yolanda Hadid (née van den Herik), is a Dutch former model. Her father, Mohamed Hadid, has claimed that his family descends from Daher al-Umar, an 18th-century ruler of northern Palestine. She has an older sister, Gigi Hadid, and a younger brother, both of whom are also models. She also has two older paternal half-sisters.

In May 2025, Hadid and her sister Gigi announced in a statement that they have a younger half-sister, through their father, who is named Aydan Nix, whom they contacted in late 2023. Nix was welcomed by her mother, Terri Hatfield Dull, after a brief relationship with Mohamed that came after his divorce from Yolanda. Hadid and her siblings were raised on a ranch in Santa Barbara, California. The family moved to Beverly Hills after ten years. Hadid's childhood home was destroyed in January 2025 due to the series of wildfires in Southern California.

As a teenager, Hadid was an equestrian in the discipline of equitation, and dreamed of competing at the 2016 Summer Olympics, but equitation was not among the equestrian disciplines contested at the Games.

During high school, Hadid was prescribed Adderall for difficulties with attention, which her psychiatrist suspected might be related to attention deficit hyperactivity disorder (ADHD). In a 2022 interview with Vogue, Hadid said that the medication's appetite-suppressing effects had contributed to her developing anorexia nervosa. She was diagnosed, along with her mother and brother, with chronic Lyme disease in 2012.

After graduating from Malibu High School in 2014, Hadid moved to New York City to study photography at the Parsons School of Design until she suspended her studies to focus on her modelling career. She has expressed an interest in returning to education to branch out into fashion photography.

== Career ==
=== 2012–2015: Early career ===
Hadid began modeling at age 16, with a commercial project for Flynn Skye in 2012. Before signing with a major modeling agency, she appeared in photographer Lesa Amoore's project The Swan Sittings and modeled for Hanna Hayes' Fall/Winter 2013 collection. She also modeled for Chrome Hearts, a fashion and accessories brand founded by the mother of her childhood friend Jesse Jo Stark.

Hadid signed to IMG Models on August 21, 2014. She made her New York Fashion Week debut in September, walking for Desigual. In December, Hadid made her first cover appearance on Jalouse, and was featured on day 27 of Love magazine's Love Advent Calendar.

In February 2015, Hadid appeared in the spring advertising campaign for handbag brand Botkier. Later that month, she walked in Tom Ford's Fall/Winter 2015 runway show, marking one of her first major appearances on the catwalk. In March, she appeared in "Fantasy Campaigns", an editorial project published by Carine Roitfeld's CR Fashion Book. In April, she was featured in another editorial for the publication, "Body by Bella". In May, she participated in amfAR's 22nd Cinema Against AIDS Gala.

In July 2015, Hadid appeared alongside Gigi in Balmain's Fall 2015 advertising campaign. In August, she appeared alongside Xiao Wen Ju in a Samsung lookbook promoting the Samsung Galaxy S6 Edge+ and Samsung Galaxy Note 5, photographed by Steven Klein. That month, she was announced as a model for Victoria's Secret Pink's holiday campaign alongside Rachel Hilbert and Devon Windsor.

During the fall 2015 fashion weeks, Hadid walked in New York, London, Milan and Paris for designers and fashion houses including Diane von Fürstenberg, Marc Jacobs, Tommy Hilfiger, Jeremy Scott, Topshop Unique, Moschino, Bottega Veneta and Balmain. She appeared in the November 2015 issue of Seventeen and in Topshop's holiday advertising campaign. In December, she made her Chanel runway debut at the fashion house's Métiers d'Art show in Rome. She also appeared in two installments of Love magazine's annual Advent Calendar.

Hadid's magazine work in 2015 included an eight-page fashion editorial in the February issue of Teen Vogue. She appeared on the covers of Grey and Unconditional magazines that spring and summer. In June, she appeared alongside Gigi on the cover of V magazine's Fall Preview issue, their first joint magazine cover. Later that year, she appeared on the cover of Editorialist's Fall/Winter issue and on one of the covers of Wonderland's tenth-anniversary issue.

=== 2016–2017: Breakthrough ===
In January 2016, Hadid made her Chanel haute couture debut at the fashion house's Spring/Summer 2016 show in Paris. She also appeared in Marc Jacobs's Spring 2016 advertising campaign. In February, she walked in Rihanna's Fenty x Puma debut show at New York Fashion Week. In March, she walked exclusively for Givenchy at Paris Fashion Week and appeared in the Spring 2016 advertising campaign for Joe's Jeans.

In May, Hadid made her Australian runway debut at Mercedes-Benz Fashion Week Australia, opening and closing Misha Collection's Resort 2017 show. She also participated in the fashion show held during amfAR's 23rd Cinema Against AIDS Gala at the Cannes Film Festival. Later that month, she walked in Dior's Cruise 2017 show at Blenheim Palace in Oxfordshire, England.

On May 31, 2016, Hadid was announced as a makeup ambassador for Dior. She subsequently appeared alongside makeup artist Peter Philips in the brand's online video series Dior Makeup Live with Bella Hadid, which premiered on June 6.

In June, Hadid modeled a look from Givenchy's Fall 2016 haute couture collection during the fashion house's Spring 2017 menswear show in Paris. In July, she walked in the Fall/Winter 2016–2017 haute couture shows for Atelier Versace and Dior, and closed Alexandre Vauthier's couture presentation in Paris. On July 7, she participated in Fendi's 90th-anniversary Haute Fourrure show, staged on a transparent runway over the Trevi Fountain in Rome.

Hadid's advertising work in 2016 included campaigns for Topshop's Spring/Summer denim collection, Givenchy's Fall/Winter collection, Calvin Klein's global Fall 2016 campaign, and J.W. Anderson's Fall/Winter campaign. In August, she photographed her longtime friends Jesse Jo Stark and Laurie Lynn Stark for W magazine at the headquarters of Chrome Hearts.

During the September 2016 fashion weeks, Hadid opened DKNY's Spring/Summer 2017 show in New York and walked for designers including Michael Kors, Anna Sui, Ralph Lauren and Marc Jacobs. She exclusively opened Versus Versace's show at London Fashion Week. At Milan Fashion Week, she opened the Spring/Summer 2017 presentations for Alberta Ferretti and Fendi, and closed the show for Philosophy di Lorenzo Serafini.

In October, Hadid appeared in the advertising campaign for Australian label Misha Collection's Gold by Misha range. On November 30, she made her Victoria's Secret Fashion Show debut in Paris. On December 13, she announced her first fashion design collaboration, a collection created with Chrome Hearts.

Hadid appeared on the cover of the March 2016 issue of Allure. In May, she made her first Vogue cover appearance in the Turkish edition of the magazine, photographed by Sebastian Faena. She also appeared on the June cover of the American edition of Elle, photographed by Terry Tsiolis.

In August 2016, Hadid appeared alongside South Korean rapper G-Dragon on the cover of Vogue Me, photographed by Mario Testino. She subsequently appeared on the September covers of Vogue Japan, Vogue Italia, photographed by Steven Meisel, and Vogue Paris, the latter alongside model Taylor Hill.

That year, Hadid appeared in Private, a short film directed by Tyler Ford for Visionaire magazine's 25th-anniversary project. In December, she was featured in the opening installment of Love magazine's 2016 Advent Calendar, directed by photographer Rankin.

In January 2017, Hadid walked in Givenchy's Fall 2017 menswear and Spring 2017 haute couture presentation in Paris. She also walked in Chanel's Spring 2017 haute couture show and opened Alexandre Vauthier's couture presentation.

On February 8, Hadid walked in Tommy Hilfiger's Spring 2017 show at Venice Beach in Los Angeles, presenting the Tommy x Gigi collection designed in collaboration with Gigi. That month, she was announced as an ambassador for Bulgari's accessories collections and for Swiss watchmaker TAG Heuer.

During New York Fashion Week, Hadid opened the Fall 2017 shows for Prabal Gurung and Zadig & Voltaire, and closed for Oscar de la Renta. She also walked for designers including Alexander Wang, Sies Marjan, Carolina Herrera, Brandon Maxwell, Michael Kors, Anna Sui and Ralph Lauren. At London Fashion Week, she closed Versus Versace's Fall 2017 show, which was opened by Gigi.

On March 1, Hadid closed H&M Studio's Spring 2017 show in Paris, which was opened by Gigi.

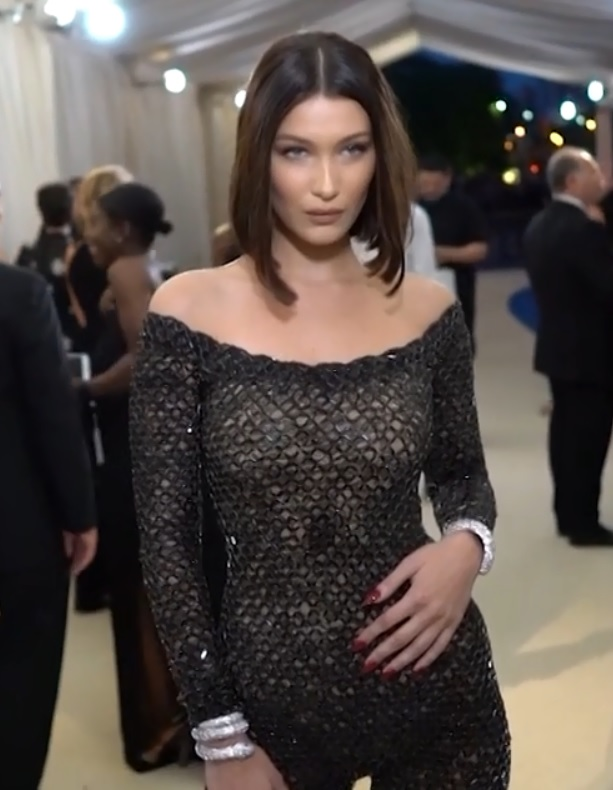
Hadid at the Met Gala in 2017

In February 2017, Hadid walked for Alberta Ferretti, Fendi, Moschino and Versace at Milan Fashion Week. At Paris Fashion Week in March, she walked for Lanvin and Chanel, and opened Off-White's Fall 2017 show.

In May, Hadid participated in Naomi Campbell's Fashion for Relief charity runway show during the 2017 Cannes Film Festival. She also attended amfAR's 24th Cinema Against AIDS Gala in Cap d'Antibes, France.

In July, Hadid walked in Miu Miu's Cruise 2018 presentation and the Fall 2017 haute couture shows for Alexandre Vauthier, Maison Margiela and Fendi. She opened Vauthier's couture show in Paris.

In early 2017, Hadid appeared alongside Gigi in the Spring/Summer advertising campaigns for Fendi and Moschino. She also featured in campaigns for DKNY and TAG Heuer, and appeared alongside Anwar in Zadig & Voltaire's Spring/Summer campaign. In March, her first advertising campaign for Dior Beauty was released, promoting Diorshow Pump'N'Volume mascara.

In May, Hadid appeared in a Nike campaign celebrating the 45th anniversary of the Nike Cortez sneaker. She was also announced as the face of Bulgari's Goldea, The Roman Night fragrance and featured in Giuseppe Zanotti's Fall 2017 footwear campaign, photographed by Mario Sorrenti.

In June, Hadid was announced as the face of Max Mara's accessories line for Fall/Winter 2017, in a campaign photographed by Steven Meisel. She appeared alongside Zayn Malik in the advertising campaign for Zayn x Versus, a clothing collaboration with Versus Versace. She also appeared in NARS Cosmetics' campaign for Powermatte Lip Pigment, photographed by François Nars.

In July, Hadid appeared alongside Kendall Jenner in Chinese fashion brand Ochirly's Fall/Winter 2017 campaign, photographed by Mario Sorrenti. In August, she became the face of Philippine clothing brand Penshoppe's Generation Now campaign.

In January 2017, Hadid appeared on the cover of W Korea, which reused an editorial photographed by Venetia Scott for the October 2016 American edition of W. In February, she appeared alongside musician Jesse Jo Stark in Teen Vogue's first volume of 2017, photographed by Daniel Jackson. She appeared on the April cover of Vogue China, photographed by Collier Schorr, and the June cover of Vogue Italia, photographed by Inez and Vinoodh.

In September 2017, Hadid appeared on the covers of five international editions of Vogue: China, Spain, Brazil, Australia and Arabia. AFP-Relaxnews reported that this set a record for the most Vogue covers featuring a model in a single month, surpassing the four achieved by Doutzen Kroes in September 2013. She also appeared on the September covers of Elle Russia and China and Harper's Bazaar China. Other cover appearances that year included CR Fashion Book and Porter.

=== 2018–2023: Further recognition ===
Hadid at the 2018 Cannes Film Festival

In January 2018, Hadid appeared on two covers of Vogue Korea, photographed by Ahn Jooyoung. In March, she and Gigi appeared on separate covers of the same issue of British Vogue, photographed by Steven Meisel and styled by Joe McKenna. The publication marked the first time they had appeared on paired covers of a magazine.

Hadid subsequently appeared on the May cover of Vogue Japan, photographed by Patrick Demarchelier, and on four alternative covers of the July issue of Vogue México, photographed by Chris Colls. In September, she appeared on the covers of Allure and Pop, photographed by Daniel Jackson and Charlotte Wales, respectively. She also appeared on the October cover of Harper's Bazaar Arabia, photographed by Mariano Vivanco.

During the Fall/Winter 2018 fashion season, Hadid walked for designers including Michael Kors, Anna Sui, Ralph Lauren and Prabal Gurung at New York Fashion Week. At Milan Fashion Week, she appeared in shows for Moschino, Fendi and Tommy Hilfiger. On March 1, she opened Off-White's Fall 2018 show at Paris Fashion Week, wearing an equestrian-inspired look designed by Virgil Abloh.

On November 8, 2018, Hadid walked in the Victoria's Secret Fashion Show in New York City, marking her third appearance in the event.

During the Fall/Winter 2019 fashion season, Hadid walked for Brandon Maxwell and Michael Kors at New York Fashion Week. On February 12, she closed Oscar de la Renta's Fall 2019 show, wearing a black tulle gown.

At Milan Fashion Week, Hadid appeared in the Fall/Winter 2019 shows for Alberta Ferretti, Fendi, Max Mara, Moschino, Roberto Cavalli and Versace. At Paris Fashion Week, she walked for Redemption and Haider Ackermann and closed Off-White's Fall 2019 show.

On June 13, Hadid participated in the inaugural CR Runway presentation, organized by Carine Roitfeld in partnership with LuisaViaRoma to mark the retailer's 90th anniversary in Florence. The show featured models including Gigi, Irina Shayk and Joan Smalls.

In September, Hadid appeared in Rihanna's Savage x Fenty Fall/Winter 2019 fashion show, held at the Barclays Center in Brooklyn, New York. The presentation combined modeling with musical performances and was subsequently released on Amazon Prime Video. In March 2019, Hadid appeared on the cover of Vogue Russia, photographed by Giampaolo Sgura. That month, she also appeared on an exclusive digital cover of the American edition of Vogue.

In April, Hadid appeared on two covers of the relaunch issue of Vogue Greece, photographed by Txema Yeste. The Greek edition had resumed publication after a seven-year hiatus. In June, she appeared on the cover of Vogue España, photographed by Zoey Grossman, and the June 28 issue of Elle France, also photographed by Grossman. In July, she appeared on her third Vogue Japan cover, photographed by Luigi & Iango.

On January 22, 2020, Hadid participated in Jean Paul Gaultier's final haute couture show as a designer, held in Paris to mark his 50-year career in fashion.

Hadid backstage at New York Fashion Week, 2021

On February 7, she walked in Tom Ford's Fall 2020 runway show at Milk Studios in Los Angeles. During New York Fashion Week, she appeared in the Fall/Winter 2020 shows for Oscar de la Renta, Khaite, Rodarte and Michael Kors. She also walked in Marc Jacobs' Fall 2020 show on February 12, wearing a black sequined gown with white opera gloves.

At Milan Fashion Week, Hadid walked for designers including Alberta Ferretti, Max Mara, Fendi, Moschino and Versace. In Paris, she appeared in the Fall 2020 presentations for Lanvin and Mugler on February 26, followed by Miu Miu on March 3. In February 2020, Hadid appeared on the cover of Vogue Hong Kong, photographed by Zoey Grossman. In April, she appeared on the cover of Vogue Korea, photographed by Luigi & Iango, and on two alternative covers of Vogue Greece, photographed by Chris Colls. The latter issue marked the first anniversary of the magazine's relaunch. Hadid and Gigi subsequently appeared on separate covers of the May/June issue of Vogue Paris, photographed by Inez & Vinoodh.

In August, Hadid appeared on the cover of the first digital issue of the American edition of Elle. The photographs were taken by Gigi at their family's farm in Pennsylvania during the COVID-19 pandemic. In September, she was among 100 people featured on individual covers of Vogue Italia, all photographed by Mark Borthwick for a special issue emphasizing diversity and individuality. She also appeared on the December cover of Vogue Japan, photographed by Luigi & Iango.

In January 2021, Hadid appeared in Givenchy's Spring/Summer 2021 advertising campaign alongside Kendall Jenner and Anok Yai. Photographed by Heji Shin, it was the first advertising campaign produced under the fashion house's creative director Matthew M. Williams. She also appeared on the March cover of Vogue España, photographed by Micaiah Carter.

On March 5, Hadid appeared in Versace's filmed Fall/Winter 2021 runway presentation, alongside Gigi and Irina Shayk. Later that month, she participated in the promotional film for the collaboration between BOSS and Russell Athletic. On March 31, she appeared in a digital runway presentation of Mugler's Spring/Summer 2021 collection, directed by creative director Casey Cadwallader.

On June 30, Hadid walked in Jacquemus' Fall 2021 runway show, titled La Montagne, which was staged in a film studio near Paris. On July 11, 2021, Hadid attended the premiere of Three Floors at the 2021 Cannes Film Festival, wearing a black Schiaparelli haute couture gown designed by Daniel Roseberry. The dress featured a plunging neckline and a gilded brass necklace shaped like human lungs. In 2022, Hadid appeared on the April cover of the American edition of Vogue, photographed by Ethan James Green. She also appeared in advertising campaigns for Versace, Swarovski, Fendi and Marc Jacobs. On September 30, 2022, Hadid closed Coperni's Spring/Summer 2023 show, held at the Musée des Arts et Métiers in Paris. During the finale, a team of specialists led by Spanish designer and inventor Manel Torres used Fabrican, a spray-on material that dries into a wearable textile, to create a white dress directly on her body.

In October 2022, designer Thom Browne described Hadid as a "once-in-a-generation talent". According to influencer marketing platform Lefty, Hadid's runway appearances during the 2022 fashion season added an average of 29% to the expected media value of the brands whose shows she walked, rising to 90% for Jil Sander.

In November 2022, Hadid was featured in the 2023 Pirelli Calendar, titled Love Letters to the Muse and photographed by Emma Summerton. On December 5, she was named Model of the Year at The Fashion Awards, organized by the British Fashion Council. She also won the Model of the Year: Women+ category in both the industry and readers' votes at Models.com's 2022 Model of the Year Awards.

In April 2023, Hadid was included in Time magazine's annual Time 100 list of the world's most influential people.

=== 2023–present: Career break and return to modeling ===
Hadid at the 2026 Cannes Film Festival

In 2023, Hadid stepped back from modeling. During her hiatus, she relocated to Fort Worth, Texas. In January 2024, she was announced as the cover model for the spring 2024 issue of Perfect, photographed by Bryce Anderson and styled by Katie Grand. The photo shoot had taken place in late 2023. In an April 2024 interview with Allure, Hadid said that she had stepped back from modeling to focus on her physical and mental health.

In July 2024, Adidas removed advertisements featuring Hadid from a campaign promoting the relaunch of its SL72 sneakers, originally introduced in 1972. The campaign drew criticism from Israel and Jewish organizations over its association with the 1972 Munich Olympics, during which members of the Palestinian militant group Black September killed eleven members of the Israeli Olympic team. Hadid, who has publicly advocated for Palestinian rights, stated that she had been unaware of the historical connection when she participated in the campaign. Adidas said the association with the events of 1972 had been unintentional and subsequently apologized to Hadid and other campaign participants.

In August 2024, Hadid was appointed a global ambassador for Swiss watch and jewellery company Chopard, appearing in an advertising campaign photographed by Alasdair McLellan. On September 24, she returned to the runway after nearly two years, walking in Saint Laurent's Spring/Summer 2025 show at Paris Fashion Week. On October 15, Hadid appeared in the Victoria's Secret Fashion Show in New York City for the first time since 2018. On March 11, 2025, Hadid walked in Saint Laurent's Fall/Winter 2025–2026 show at Paris Fashion Week. On May 13, she attended the opening ceremony of the 2025 Cannes Film Festival, wearing a black Saint Laurent dress featuring a thigh-high slit and open back. Hadid also appeared on the cover of the June 2025 issue of British Vogue, photographed by Steven Meisel and styled by IB Kamara.

=== Other ventures ===
In September 2021, Hadid joined Kin Euphorics, a nonalcoholic beverage company founded by Jen Batchelor, as a co-founder and business partner. Her involvement included branding, marketing and product development. In 2022, she made her acting debut in the third season of the comedy-drama series Ramy, portraying Lena.

In May 2024, Hadid launched Orebella, a fragrance brand that debuted with three perfumes. In December, she appeared as Sadie in the fifth season of the television series Yellowstone. In May 2025, Orebella made its first international retail launch in the United Kingdom through Selfridges. In April 2026, the brand expanded its range to include body and hair perfume mists. Hadid serves as its founder and chief creative officer.

== Personal life ==
=== Relationships ===
From 2015 to 2019, Hadid was in an on-and-off relationship with Canadian singer-songwriter the Weeknd. She appeared in the music video for his 2015 single "In the Night". Hadid's relationship with art director Marc Kalman became public in July 2021, although they had reportedly been dating since 2020. They separated in spring 2023.

In 2023, Hadid began a relationship with professional equestrian Adan Banuelos. Although their separation was reported in January 2026, Us Weekly reported the following month that they had reconciled. In November 2026, The Wall Street Journal reported that Hadid was dating construction project manager Nathan Lacy.

=== Religion ===
In a 2017 interview with Porter, Hadid discussed her father's experience as a Palestinian refugee and the impact of US immigration restrictions on her family. She stated that she was "proud to be a Muslim".

In a March 2022 interview with Vogue, Hadid described herself as spiritual and said that she felt connected to different religions. The magazine reported that she had grown up surrounded by Jewish traditions through her friends and godparents and that she was interested in Islam, her father's faith.

== Activism ==
Hadid is a long-time supporter of Palestine. In January 2017, Hadid attended the "No Ban, No Wall" march in New York City, saying in an interview it was her own family history that drove her to participate in the march. In December 2017, Hadid joined protests in London against Trump's decision to move the U.S. embassy in Israel and recognize Jerusalem as the capital of Israel.

In October 2023, Hadid condemned Hamas' October 7 attacks against Israel. Amid the ensuing Gaza War, Hadid and her sister Gigi donated $1 million to Palestinian aid agencies, with Hadid also participating in Gaza war protests and calling Israel's actions genocide. Hadid stated that she and her family have received death threats for their pro-Palestinian stance, saying: "I've been sent hundreds of death threats daily, my phone number has been leaked, and my family has felt to be in danger. But I can not be silenced any longer. Fear is not an option." In November 2023, Israeli music duo Ness & Stilla released the single "Harbu Darbu", calling for her death.

== Awards and nominations ==
Year	Award	Category	Result
2015	Models.com Model of the Year Awards	Breakout Star: Women (Readers' Choice)	Won
2015	Models.com Model of the Year Awards	Social Media Star: Women	Nominated
2016	Fashion Los Angeles Awards	Model of the Year	Won
2016	GQ Men of the Year Awards	Hugo Boss Model of the Year	Won
2016	The Fashion Awards	International Model	Nominated
2016	Models.com Model of the Year Awards	Model of the Year: Women (Industry's Vote)	Won
2016	Models.com Model of the Year Awards	Model of the Year: Women (Readers' Choice)	Nominated
2016	Models.com Model of the Year Awards	Social Media Star: Women	Nominated
2017	Models.com Model of the Year Awards	Model of the Year: Women (Readers' Choice)	Won
2017	Models.com Model of the Year Awards	Social Media Star: Women (Readers' Choice)	Won
2018	Models.com Model of the Year Awards	Model of the Year: Women	Nominated
2018	Models.com Model of the Year Awards	Social Media Star: Women	Nominated
2018	Models.com Model of the Year Awards	Best Street Style Women (Readers' Choice)	Won
2019	Models.com Model of the Year Awards	Model of the Year: Women	Nominated
2019	Models.com Model of the Year Awards	Social Media Star: Women (Industry's Vote)	Won
2019	Models.com Model of the Year Awards	Best Street Style Women (Readers' Choice)	Won
2020	Models.com Model of the Year Awards	Model of the Year: Women	Nominated
2021	Models.com Model of the Year Awards	Social Mover of the Year (Readers' Choice)	Won
2022	Models.com Model of the Year Awards	Model of the Year: Women+ (Industry's Vote)	Won
2022	Models.com Model of the Year Awards	Model of the Year: Women+ (Readers' Choice)	Won
2022	Models.com Model of the Year Awards	Social Mover of the Year (Readers' Choice)	Won
2022	The Fashion Awards	Model of the Year	Won
2023	Models.com Model of the Year Awards	Model of the Year: Women+	Nominated
2023	Models.com Model of the Year Awards	Social Mover of the Year (Industry's Vote)	Won
2024	Models.com Model of the Year Awards	Social Mover of the Year (Readers' Choice)	Won
2025	Models.com Model of the Year Awards	Social Mover of the Year	Nominated
2025	Models.com Model of the Year Awards	Best Street Style Women+	Nominated

== Filmography ==
=== Television ===
Year	Title	Role	Notes
2012–2016	The Real Housewives of Beverly Hills	Herself	Seasons 3–6
2018	Making a Model with Yolanda Hadid	Herself	Guest appearance
2022	Ramy	Lena	Season 3
2024	Holland's Next Top Model	Herself	Guest appearance
2024	Yellowstone	Sadie	Season 5
2026	The Beauty	Ruby Rossdale	"Beautiful Pilot"

=== Short films and editorial videos ===
Year	Title	Publisher	Role	Notes
2015	Bella Hadid's Guide to L.A.	i-D	Herself	Directed by Columbine Goldsmith.
2016	Private	Visionaire	Herself	Directed by Tyler Ford.
2017	Going Home with Bella Hadid	W	Herself	Editorial video.
2017	Poster Girl	Teen Vogue	Dream girl	Directed by Santiago and Mauricio.

=== Music videos ===
Year	Artist	Title
2015	The Weeknd	"In the Night"
2016	Jesse Jo Stark	"Down Your Drain"
2022	Offset and Moneybagg Yo	"Code"
2024	Mustafa	"Gaza Is Calling"
