= Fabrican =

Instant spray-on fabric technology

Fabrican is an instant spray-on fabric technology. The spray-on material is made from polymers and natural or synthetic fibers. The spray is delivered from a compressed air spray gun or aerosol can and dries upon contact with the air, creating a non-woven fabric that can be applied to many surfaces (including water). The material is sterile when it is dispensed from the spray gun or aerosol can.

== History ==
Fabrican was invented by Manel Torres while investigating ways to speed up conventional methods of constructing garments as part of his Ph. D. research in Fashion at the Royal College of Art and Imperial College London. Torres founded Fabrican Ltd in 2003. The technology was further developed by Fabrican Ltd while based at Imperial College London.

Fabrican was showcased at London Fashion Week 2010 as well as in fashion shows in Milan and Moscow and at TED Talks. The technology has also been featured in the media by the BBC, the Discovery Channel, and CBS News.

In 2014, in conformity with an organizational emphasis on developing biomedical applications, fabrican occupied new laboratory facilities at the London Bioscience Innovation Centre.

At Paris Fashion Week 2022, Bella Hadid closed the Coperni fashion show after being sprayed into a dress on stage and walking the runway.

== See also ==
- Spray-on condom
- Silly String
- Spray-on skin
