= Richard Stark (designer) =

American fashion designer

Richard Stark (born May 19, 1960) is an American fashion designer and the co-founder of luxury brand Chrome Hearts.

== Early life ==
Richard Stark was born on May 19, 1960, in Utica, New York. He has a background in carpentry, receiving his training at a building company as a carpentry apprentice. Before founding Chrome Hearts, Stark represented tanneries and sold leather hides to manufacturers.

== Chrome Hearts ==
=== Early stages and founding (1988) ===
Stark started the business in a Los Angeles garage alongside Leonard Kamhout, a jeweler, and John Bowman, a manufacturer of leather goods. At the time, Stark was a premium leather dealer, sourcing materials while Bowman handled production. The trio made leather motorcycle riding gear for friends and members of the local motorcycle scene. Eventually, an unexpected gig doing costume design for a B movie, Chopper Chicks in Zombietown, pushed the brand into the mainstream fashion sphere. One of the actors, a then-girlfriend of Sex Pistols lead guitarist Steve Jones, introduced Stark to the musician, who quickly became a fan, wearing Stark's designs on stage, while Stark named the brand after the film's working title, Chrome Hearts. Other popular bands like Motley Crüe and Guns N' Roses started wearing the Chrome Hearts' leather pieces and accessories as well and shortly thereafter, Stark opened up the first private store in LA's Skid Row.

=== Establishment as brand and expansion ===
In 1992, the brand received critical acclaim and Stark was awarded the Council of Fashion Designers America (CFDA) prize for Best Accessories Designer. Stark initially announced he had no intention of accepting the award, partly because he was unfamiliar with who the CFDA were. When told he could choose any celebrity to represent him, he and his wife eventually chose Cher. A 1999 article in the Japan Times even referred to Stark as “the anti designer." Stark would explain to the Japan Times:

“There’s no game being played for the fashion world. To me, Chrome Hearts has got nothing to do with the fashion world,” “We don’t have any seasons. I make things when I wanna make them because I wanna make them.”

In 1994, the trio of founders split and Stark bought his partners out of the business, with his wife Laurie Lynn assuming a more formal role. At the time, Chrome Hearts had expanded dramatically, well beyond leather goods. Jewelry, the largest source of revenue, became the main focus and Stark explored other avenues including furniture, home goods, and even custom work ranging from pool tables to private jet interiors.

In 1996, Chrome Hearts' first boutique opened at 159 East 64th Street, Manhattan, New York City.

== Personal life ==
Stark met his wife Laurie Lynn when she ordered a collection of leather swimsuits from him in the '90s. The couple have three children; Kristian, Frankie Belle, and Jesse Jo Stark. Stark and his wife own seven multi-million dollar homes in Malibu, including a nearly-$40 million home on Paradise Cove. The designer is known for being press averse, rarely giving out interviews. He has stated that without his wife, "everything we do would be zero press”. He has always been a motorcycle enthusiast, claiming to have ridden his motorcycle through cemeteries while growing up in Utica.
