= The Elder Statesman (brand) =

American fashion and lifestyle brand

- Company type: Private
- Industry: Retail
- Founded: 2007; 19 years ago
- Founder: Greg Chait
- Headquarters: Los Angeles, California, United States
- Products: Luxury goods
- Website: elder-statesman.com

The Elder Statesman is a luxury clothing, fashion and lifestyle brand based in Los Angeles founded in 2007 by Greg Chait.

== History ==
Founder Greg Chait was inspired by the gift of a cashmere blanket in 2002 to pursue a niche market. After he made some cashmere blankets for himself, Maxfield in Los Angeles sold some of his samples and requested more product. The brand was founded in 2007 and expanded into a West Hollywood appointment-only studio in 2011.

As of 2011, the brand's clothing lines were carried in stores such as Barneys New York.

As of 2014, the brand was known for its knitwear, was carried in stores worldwide, had 25 employees and had relocated to a Culver City factory. In June 2014, the company opened up an online store. The brand is expected to open its first store in Los Angeles in late 2014.

Chait had previously been chief executive officer of niche Australian denim brand Ksubi. In December 2011, Justin Doss of GQ selected The Elder Statesman as his editor's pick.

In 2012, founder Greg Chait was recognized with the $300,000 CFDA/Vogue Fashion Fund Award.

During New York Fashion Week in February 2014, the brand was featured in The Wall Street Journal for its unique artistic installation of its cashmere line. The brand is known for its intricacy, quality, and limited quantity of supply.

== Corporate partners ==
In March 2014, The Elder Statesman received a minority-stake equity investment from "cult luxury jewellery [sic] and accessories brand Chrome Hearts". In September 2014, the brand partnered with private plane charter company XOJet to provide its customers with various luxury wares.
