= List of Numéro magazine cover models =

This list of Numéro cover models (1999–present) is a catalog of cover models who have appeared on the cover of the French fashion magazine Numéro.

== 1990s ==
=== 1999 ===
Issue	Cover model	Photographer
March (#1)	Kate Moss	Nathaniel Goldberg
April (#2)	Małgosia Bela	Nathaniel Goldberg
May (#3)	Gisele Bündchen	Nathaniel Goldberg
June (#4)	Carmen Kass	Nathaniel Goldberg
July/August (#5)	Aurélie Claudel	Nathaniel Goldberg
September (#6)	Liisa Winkler	Sean Ellis
October (#7)	Frankie Rayder	Liz Collins
November (#8)	Gisele Bündchen	Sean Ellis
December/January 2000 (#9)	Kate Moss	Mert & Marcus

== 2000s ==
=== 2000 ===
Issue	Cover model	Photographer
February (#10)	Frankie Rayder	Steen Sundland
March (#11)	Ana Cláudia Michels	Sean Ellis
April (#12)	Angela Lindvall	Thomas Schenk
May (#13	Karen Elson	Thomas Schenk
June/July (#14)	Gisele Bündchen	Thomas Schenk
August (#15)	Gisele Bündchen	Patrick Demarchelier
September (#16)	Angela Lindvall	Thomas Schenk
October (#17)	Kristina Tsirekidze	Mert & Marcus
November (#18)	Amy Lemons	Stéphane Sednaoui
December/January 2001 (#19)	Vivien Solari	Mert & Marcus

=== 2001 ===
Issue	Cover model	Photographer
February (#20)	Aiste Miseviciute	Satoshi Saïkusa
March (#21)	Angela Lindvall	Thomas Schenk
April (#22)	An Oost	Sean Ellis
May (#23)	Kate Moss	Mert & Marcus
June (#24)	Karolína Kurková	Stéphane Sednaoui
July/August (#25)	Diána Mészáros	Sølve Sundsbø
September (#26)	Diána Mészáros	Stéphane Sednaoui
October (#27)	Linda Evangelista	Mert & Marcus
November (#28)	Kate Moss	Sølve Sundsbø
December/January 2002 (#29)	Rie Rasmussen	Mert & Marcus

=== 2002 ===
Issue	Cover model	Photographer
February (#30)	Clara Veiga Gazinelli	Sølve Sundsbø
March (#31)	Nataša Vojnović	Satoshi Saïkusa
April (#32)	Natalia Vodianova	Sølve Sundsbø
May (#33)	Eva Herzigová	Sølve Sundsbø
June (#34)	Marianne Schröder	Sølve Sundsbø
July/August (#35)	Kylie Minogue	Stéphane Sednaoui
September (#36)	Gisele Bündchen	Patrick Demarchelier
October (#37)	Eugenia Volodina	Sølve Sundsbø
November (#38)	Erin Wasson	Jean-Baptiste Mondino
December/January 2003 (#39)	Jessica Miller	Sølve Sundsbø

=== 2003 ===
Issue	Cover model	Photographer
February (#40)	Natalia Vodianova	Sølve Sundsbø
March (#41)	Filippa Hamilton	Greg Kadel
April (#42)	Milla Jovovich	Sølve Sundsbø
May (#43)	Natalia Vodianova	Rene Habermacher
June (#44)	Linda Evangelista	Karl Lagerfeld
July/August (#45)	Leticia Birkheuer	Vincent Peters
September (#46)	Kate Moss	Sølve Sundsbø
October (#47)	Amber Valletta	Nathaniel Goldberg
November (#48)	Gisele Bündchen	Patrick Demarchelier
December/January 2004 (#49)	Rianne ten Haken	Mert & Marcus

=== 2004 ===
Issue	Cover model	Photographer
February (#50)	Natalia Vodianova	Sølve Sundsbø
March (#51)	Daria Werbowy	Greg Kadel
April (#52)	Rianne ten Haken	Jean-Baptiste Mondino
May (#53)	Liya Kebede	Nathaniel Goldberg
June/July (#54)	Isabeli Fontana	Greg Kadel
August (#55)	Jessica Stam	Vincent Peters
September (#56)	Lily Cole	Vincent Peters
October (#57)	Gemma Ward	Greg Kadel
November (#58)	Karen Elson	Sølve Sundsbø
December/January 2005 (#59)	Kate Moss	Sølve Sundsbø

=== 2005 ===
Issue	Cover model	Photographer
February (#60)	Bianca Balti	Sølve Sundsbø
March (#61)	Daria Werbowy	Greg Kadel
April (#62)	Anja Rubik	Greg Kadel
May (#63)	Doutzen Kroes	Sølve Sundsbø
June/July (#64)	Lily Donaldson	Greg Kadel
August (#65)	Daria Werbowy	Greg Kadel
September (#66)	Gemma Ward	Greg Kadel
October (#67)	Bianca Balti	Greg Kadel
November (#68)	Guinevere Van Seenus	Liz Collins
December/January 2006 (#69)	Lily Donaldson	Sølve Sundsbø

=== 2006 ===
Issue	Cover model	Photographer
February (#70)	Doutzen Kroes	Greg Kadel
March (#71)	Leah de Wavrin	Sølve Sundsbø
April (#72)	Snejana Onopka	Greg Kadel
May (#73)	Angela Lindvall	Liz Collins
June (#74)	Anja Rubik	Camilla Åkrans
July/August (#75)	Freja Beha Erichsen	Greg Kadel
September (#76)	Amanda Moore	Jean-Baptiste Mondino
October (#77)	Raquel Zimmermann	Sølve Sundsbø
November (#78)	Gemma Ward	Greg Kadel
December/January 2007 (#79)	Coco Rocha	Jean-Baptiste Mondino

=== 2007 ===
Issue	Cover model	Photographer
February (#80)	Małgosia Bela	Camilla Åkrans
March (#81)	Freja Beha Erichsen	Karl Lagerfeld
April (#82)	Daria Werbowy	Greg Kadel
May (#83)	Hilary Rhoda	Greg Kadel
June/July (#84)	Anja Rubik	Greg Kadel
August (#85)	Caroline Trentini, Masha Novoselova	Greg Kadel
September (#86)	Sasha Pivovarova	Camilla Åkrans
October (#87)	Lily Donaldson	Greg Kadel
November (#88)	Coco Rocha	Sølve Sundsbø
December/January 2008 (#89)	Alana Zimmer	Horst Diekgerdes

=== 2008 ===
Issue	Cover model	Photographer
February (#90)	Catherine McNeil	Greg Kadel
March (#91)	Suvi Koponen	Greg Kadel
April (#92)	Catherine McNeil	Greg Kadel
May (#93)	Georgina Stojiljković	Greg Kadel
June/July (#94)	Natasha Poly	Horst Diekgerdes
August (#95)	Heidi Mount	Greg Kadel
September (#96)	Edita Vilkevičiūtė	Camilla Åkrans
October (#97)	Stephanie Seymour	Greg Kadel
November (#98)	Naomi Campbell	Miguel Reveriego
December/January 2009 (#99)	Isabeli Fontana	Sølve Sundsbø

=== 2009 ===
Issue	Cover model	Photographer
February (#100)	Toni Garrn	Sølve Sundsbø
March (#101)	Gisele Bündchen	Greg Kadel
April (#102)	Heidi Mount	Sebastian Kim
May (#103)	Magdalena Frackowiak	Sølve Sundsbø
June/July (#104)	Karen Elson	Michael Thompson
August (#105)	Catherine McNeil	Greg Kadel
September (#106)	Lara Stone	Karl Lagerfeld
October (#107)	Enikő Mihalik	Greg Kadel
November (#108)	Toni Garrn	Greg Kadel
December/January 2010 (#109)	Abbey Lee Kershaw	Miguel Reveriego

== 2010s ==
=== 2010 ===
Issue	Cover model	Photographer
February (#110)	Anna Selezneva	Peter Lindbergh
March (#111)	Edita Vilkevičiūtė	Sølve Sundsbø
April (#112)	Sessilee Lopez, Toni Garrn	Jean-Baptiste Mondino
May (#113)	Anja Rubik	Camilla Åkrans
June/July (#114)	Monika Jagaciak	Sølve Sundsbø
August (#115)	Emily DiDonato	Anthony Maule
September (#116)	Natasha Poly	Karl Lagerfeld
October (#117)	Constance Jablonski	Greg Kadel
November (#118)	Sigrid Agren	Greg Kadel
December/January 2011 (#119)	Monika Jagaciak	Greg Kadel

=== 2011 ===
Issue	Cover model	Photographer
February (#120)	Enikő Mihalik	Ben Hassett
March (#121)	Freja Beha Erichsen & Arizona Muse	Karl Lagerfeld
April (#122)	Małgosia Bela	Greg Kadel
May (#123)	Abbey Lee Kershaw	Tom Munro
June/July (#124)	Daphne Groeneveld	Greg Kadel
August (#125)	Samantha Gradoville	Sofia Sanchez & Mauro Mongiello
September (#126)	Abbey Lee Kershaw; Karmen Pedaru; Anja Rubik; Saskia de Brauw; Stella Tennant	Karl Lagerfeld
October (#127)	Karmen Pedaru	Greg Kadel
November (#128)	Aline Weber	Camilla Åkrans
December/January 2012 (#129)	Karlie Kloss	Greg Kadel

=== 2012 ===
Issue	Cover model	Photographer
February (#130)	Enikő Mihalik	Sofia Sanchez & Mauro Mongiello
March (#131)	Saskia de Brauw	Karl Lagerfeld
March (#131)	Karlie Kloss	Karl Lagerfeld
March (#131)	Daria Strokous	Karl Lagerfeld
March (#131)	Aymeline Valade	Karl Lagerfeld
April (#132)	Aymeline Valade	Sofia Sanchez & Mauro Mongiello
May (#133)	Zuzanna Bijoch	Sebastian Kim
June/July (#134)	Lindsey Wixson	Sebastian Kim
August (#135)	Anne Vyalitsyna	Warren Du Preez and Nick Thornton Jones
September (#136)	Karlie Kloss, Daria Strokous	Karl Lagerfeld
September (#136)	Lindsey Wixson, Edie Campbell	Karl Lagerfeld
October (#137)	Catherine McNeil	Jean-Baptiste Mondino
November (#138)	Sigrid Agren	Katja Rahlwes
December/January 2013 (#139)	Julia Nobis	Anthony Maule

=== 2013 ===
Issue	Cover model	Photographer
February (#140)	Nadja Bender	Sebastian Kim
March (#141)	Natalia Vodianova	Karl Lagerfeld
April (#142)	Aymeline Valade	Richard Bush
May (#143)	Marte Mei van Haaster	Jacob Sutton
June/July (#144)	Sasha Luss	Anthony Maule
August (#145)	Daphne Groeneveld	Ellen von Unwerth
September (#146)	Nadja Bender	Karl Lagerfeld
September (#146)	Cara Delevingne	Karl Lagerfeld
September (#146)	Ashleigh Good	Karl Lagerfeld
October (#147)	Catherine McNeil; Sasha Luss; Aymeline Valade; Daphne Groeneveld; Soo Joo Park	Peter Lindbergh
November (#148)	Mariacarla Boscono	Stéphane Sednaoui
December/January 2014 (#149)	Karmen Pedaru	Greg Kadel

=== 2014 ===
Issue	Cover model	Photographer
February (#150)	Lindsey Wixson	Greg Kadel
March (#151)	Nadja Bender	Karl Lagerfeld
March (#151)	Saskia de Brauw	Karl Lagerfeld
April (#152)	Ola Rudnicka	Richard Bush
May (#153)	Aymeline Valade	Txema Yeste
June/July (#154)	Constance Jablonski	Benny Horne
June/July (#154)	Karen Elson	Victor Demarchelier
June/July (#154)	Sasha Luss	Daniel Sannwald
August (#155)	Amanda Murphy	Greg Kadel
September (#156)	Lexi Boling	Karl Lagerfeld
September (#156)	Sasha Luss	Karl Lagerfeld
September (#156)	Maartje Verhoef	Karl Lagerfeld
October (#157)	Amanda Wellsh	Txema Yeste
November (#158)	Kate Grigorieva	Billy Kidd
December/January 2015 (#159)	Toni Garrn	Greg Kadel

=== 2015 ===
Issue	Cover model	Photographer
February (#160)	Daria Strokous	Daniel Sannwald
March (#161)	Anna Ewers	Karl Lagerfeld
April (#162)	Mariacarla Boscono	Peter Lindbergh
May (#163)	Aya Jones	Daniel Sannwald
June/July (#164)	Daphne Groeneveld	Greg Kadel
June/July (#164)	Jessica Miller	David Mushegain
August (#165)	Crista Cober	Txema Yeste
September (#166)	Daria Strokous	Nathaniel Goldberg
October (#167)	Molly Bair	Daniel Sannwald
November (#168)	Lili Sumner	Miles Aldridge
December/January 2016 (#169)	Gigi Hadid	Jean-Baptiste Mondino

=== 2016 ===
Issue	Cover model	Photographer
February (#170)	Catherine McNeil & Ryan Keating	Victor Demarchelier
March (#171)	Maartje Verhoef	Txema Yeste
April (#172)	Sarah Brannon	Greg Kadel
May (#173)	Irina Shayk	Anthony Maule
June/July (#174)	Daria Strokous	Mathieu César
June/July (#174)	Julie Hoomans	Victor Demarchelier
June/July (#174)	Lorena Maraschi	Sofia Sanchez & Mauro Mongiello
August (#175)	Stella Lucia	Txema Yeste
September (#176)	Mariacarla Boscono	Jean-Baptiste Mondino
October (#177)	Sarah Brannon	Anthony Maule
November (#178)	Joan Smalls	Greg Kadel
December/January 2017 (#179)	Roos Abels	Txema Yeste

=== 2017 ===
Issue	Cover model	Photographer
February (#180)	Catherine McNeil	Jean-Baptiste Mondino
March (#181)	Arizona Muse	Katja Mayer
April (#182)	Alexandra Micu	Katja Mayer
May (#183)	Daphne Groeneveld	Greg Kadel
May (#183)	Grace Bol	Txema Yeste
June/July (#184)	Cameron Russell	Txema Yeste
August (#185)	Guinevere Van Seenus	Nathaniel Goldberg
September (#186)	Sarah Brannon & Stella Maxwell	Anthony Maule
October (#187)	Yasmin Wijnaldum	Yvan Fabing
November (#188)	Małgosia Bela	Txema Yeste
December/January 2018 (#189)	Sarah Dahl	Sølve Sundsbø
December/January 2018 (#189)	Ine Neefs	Sølve Sundsbø
December/January 2018 (#189)	Camille Hurel	Sølve Sundsbø

=== 2018 ===
Issue	Cover model	Photographer
February (#190)	Cara Delevingne	Jean-Baptiste Mondino
March (#191)	Charlee Fraser	Jean-Baptiste Mondino
April (#192)	Naomi Campbell	Peter Lindbergh
May (#193)	Edita Vilkevičiūtė	Txema Yeste
May (#193)	Marie-Agnès Gillot	Koto Bolofo
June/July (#194)	Karly Loyce	Txema Yeste
June/July (#194)	Taylor Hill	Jacob Sutton
August (#195)	Adesuwa Aighewi	Daniel Sannwald
September (#196)	Abbey Lee Kershaw, Jamie Bochert	Jean-Baptiste Mondino
October (#197)	Signe Veiteberg	Marco van Rijt
November (#198)	Amilna Estevão	Hans Feurer
November (#198)	Fatou Jobe	Robbie Lawrence
December/January 2019 (#199)	Hannah Motler	Txema Yeste

=== 2019 ===
Issue	Cover model	Photographer
February (#200)	Lexi Boling	Jean-Baptiste Mondino
February (#200)	Lexi Boling	Jean-Baptiste Mondino
February (#200)	Irina Shayk	Peter Lindbergh
March (#201)	Cara Delevingne	Jean-Baptiste Mondino
April (#202)	Sara Sampaio	Hugh Lippe
April (#202)	Isabeli Fontana	Billy Kidd
May (#203)	Adwoa Aboah	Jean-Baptiste Mondino
June/July (#204)	Blésnya Minher	Txema Yeste
August (#205)	Taylor Hill	Hugh Lippe
September (#206)	Birgit Kos	Peter Lindbergh
October (#207)	Simona Kunst	Jean-Baptiste Mondino
November (#208)	Catherine McNeil	Alexander Saladrigas
December/January 2019 (#209)	Lexi Boling	Charles Varenne
December/January 2019 (#209)	Lexi Boling	Sebastian Kim
December/January 2019 (#209)	Giedre Dukauskaite	Cameron McCoo

== 2020s ==
=== 2020 ===
Issue	Cover model	Photographer
February (#210)	Janet Jumbo	Txema Yeste
February (#210)	Sasha Luss	Hans Feurer
March (#211)	Veronika Kunz	Jean-Baptiste Mondino
April (#212)	Ajok Madel	Sofia Sanchez and Mauro Mongiello
May (#213)	Laetitia Casta	Emmanuel Giraud
May (#213)	Edita Vilkeviciute	Sebastian Kim
June/July (#214)	Lady Gaga	Hedi Slimane
August (#215)	Kaya Wilkins, Mallik Jalloh, Emil Schueler	Dan Beleiu
August (#215)	Achenrin Madit	Sebastian Kim
September (#216)	Blésnya Minher	Jean-Baptiste Mondino
September (#216)	Malika Louback	Jean-Baptiste Mondino
October (#217)	Malgosia Bela	Dan Beleiu
October (#217)	Erika Linder	Victor Demarchelier
October (#217)	Birgit Kos	Boo George
November (#218)	Assa Beradji	Txema Yeste
November (#218)	Barbara Valente	Colin Solal Cardo
December/January 2021 (#219)	Maike Inga	Dominique Issermann
December/January 2021 (#219)	Lous and the Yakuza	

=== 2021 ===
Issue	Cover model	Photographer
February (#220)	Dija Kallon, Lydia Kloos	Jean-Baptiste Mondino
March (#221)	Antonia Przedpelski, Topsy, Zso Varju	Jean-Baptiste Mondino
March (#221)	Mariacarla Boscono	Dan Beleiu
March (#221)	Luna Bijl	Boo George
April/May (#222)	Ajok Madel	Jean-Baptiste Mondino
June/July/August (#223)	Jorja Smith	Lusha Alic
June/July/August (#223)	Mayowa Nicholas	Yulia Gorbachenko
September (#224)	Akon Changkou	Jean-Baptiste Mondino
September (#224)	June Cornelissens	Jean-Baptiste Mondino
October (#225)	Sara Grace Wallerstedt	Jean-Baptiste Mondino
November (#226)	Adit Priscilla	Txema Yeste
November (#226)	Shanelle Nyasiase	Dan Beleiu
December/January 2022 (#227)	Liya Kebede	Dominique Issermann

=== 2022 ===
Issue	Cover model	Photographer
February (#228)	Emily Miller	Jean-Baptiste Mondino
March (#229)	Léa Seydoux	Jean-Baptiste Mondino
April/May (#230)	Malika Louback	Jean-Baptiste Mondino
April/May (#230)	Maty Fall Diba	Jean-Baptiste Mondino
June/July/August (#231)	Anitta	Colin Solal Cardo
June/July/August (#231)	Lou Doillon	Jean-Baptiste Mondino
June/July/August (#231)	Paris Jackson	Sofia Sanchez and Mauro Mongiello
June/July/August (#231)	Caroline Polachek	Cameron McCool
September (#232)	Anyier Anei	Jean-Baptiste Mondino
September (#232)	Divine Nwaokogba	Jean-Baptiste Mondino
September (#232)	Jibriil Ollow	Jean-Baptiste Mondino
October (#233)	Cara Taylor	Jean-Baptiste Mondino
November (#234)	Małgosia Bela	Greg Kadel
November (#234)	Maaike Klaasen	Txema Yeste
December/January 2023 (#235)	Tanya Churbanova	Szilveszter Makó
December/January 2023 (#235)	Maike Inga	Ben Hassett

=== 2023 ===
Issue	Cover model	Photographer
February (#236)	Alix Bouthors	Jean-Baptiste Mondino
February (#236)	Yoonmi Sun	Jean-Baptiste Mondino
March (#237)	Rejoice Chuol	Jean-Baptiste Mondino
March (#237)	Vilma Sjöberg	Jean-Baptiste Mondino
March (#237)	Hunter Schafer	Harley Weir
April/May (#238)	Shin Hyunji	Cho Gi-Seok
April/May (#238)	Helena Olmedo Duynslaeger, Tristan Ridel	Koto Bolofo
June/July/August (#239)	Aylah Peterson	Ben Hassett
June/July/August (#239)	Náømí Ápájøk Lueth	Txema Yeste
September (#240)	Chaima Ameziane	Jean-Baptiste Mondino
September (#240)	Cara Taylor	Jean-Baptiste Mondino
October (#241)	Maty Fall Diba	Jean-Baptiste Mondino
October (#241)	Jimai Hoth Gor	Jean-Baptiste Mondino
November (#242)	Valentina Castro	Txema Yeste
November (#242)	Hyun Ji Shin	Szilveszter Makó
December/January 2024 (#243)	Tanya Churbanova	Txema Yeste
December/January 2024 (#243)	Marilou Hanriot	Ben Hassett

=== 2024 ===
Issue	Cover model	Photographer
February (#244)	Chaima Ameziane	Jean-Baptiste Mondino
February (#244)	Nyakong Chan	Jean-Baptiste Mondino
February (#244)	Sun Mizrahi	Jean-Baptiste Mondino
February (#244)	Vilma Sjoberg	Jean-Baptiste Mondino
March (#245)	Nyaduola Gabriel	Brigitte Niedermair
March (#245)	Maike Inga	Brigitte Niedermair
March (#245)	Eva Herzigová	Szilveszter Makó
April/May (#246)	Akon Changkou	Kenny Germé
April/May (#246)	Elisa Nijman	Txema Yeste
September (#247)	Dove Cameron	Kenny Germé
September (#247)	Beauïse Genç	Tom Munro
September (#247)	Joan Smalls	Fabien Monqitue
September (#247)	Lulu Wood	Bastiaan Woudt
October (#248)	Alix Bouthors	Brigitte Niedermair
October (#248)	Steinberg	Szilveszter Makó
November (#249)	Nyaduola Gabriel	Txema Yeste
November (#249)	Georgia Palmer	Kenny Germé
November (#249)	Tilda Swinton	Jean-Baptiste Mondino
December/January 2025 (#250)	Naomi Campbell	Peter Lindbergh
December/January 2025 (#250)	Cara Delevingne	Jean-Baptiste Mondino
December/January 2025 (#250)	Freja Beha Erichsen	Karl Lagerfeld
December/January 2025 (#250)	Liya Kebede	Koto Bolofo
December/January 2025 (#250)	Anne-Catherine Lacroix	Sølve Sundsbø
December/January 2025 (#250)	Kate Moss	Nathaniel Goldberg
December/January 2025 (#250)	Natalia Vodianova	Sølve Sundsbø
December/January 2025 (#250)	Nataša Vojnović	Jean-Baptiste Mondino

=== 2025 ===
Issue	Cover model	Photographer
February (#251)	Alix Bouthors	Yulia Gorbachenko
February (#251)	Yseult	Jean-Baptiste Mondino
March (#252)	Rejoice Chuol	Kenny Germé
March (#252)	Eva Komuves	Brigitte Niedermair
April/May (#253)	Huijia Chen	Txema Yeste
April/May (#253)	Mirthe Dijk	Bastiaan Woudt
April/May (#253)	Isabeli Fontana	Fabien Montique
June/July/August (#254)	Andreea Diaconu	Yulia Gorbachenko
June/July/August (#254)	Venus He, Yilan Hua	Kenny Germé
June/July/August (#254)	Kirstine Lindseth	Julien Vallon
September (#255)	Viktoria Wirs	Thomas Hauser
September (#255)	Viktoria Wirs	Brigitte Niedermair
October (#256)	Małgosia Bela	Yulia Gorbachenko
October (#256)	Achol Kuir	Kenny Germé
October (#256)	Lara Stone	Matt Easton
November (#257)	Josephen Akuei	Natasha Kot
November (#257)	Paris Hilton	Matt Easton
December/January 2026 (#258)	Aya Nakamura	Jean-Baptiste Mondino

=== 2026 ===
Issue	Cover model	Photographer
February (#259)	Summer Dirx	Jean-Baptiste Mondino
February (#259)	Greta Hofer	Edgar Berg
February (#259)	Bhavitha Mandava	Agata Serge
February (#259)	Maya Sturn	Matt Easton
February (#259)	Agnes Wahlstrom	Melissa De Arajuo
March (#260)	Luna Bijl	Matt Easton
March (#260)	Fatou Kebbeh	Kenny Germé
April/May (#261)	Deva Cassel	Brigitte Niedermair
April/May (#261)	Benedicta Ilamosi	Brigitte Niedermair
June/July/August (#262)	Anyier Anei	Julien Vallon
June/July/August (#262)	Vika Evseeva	Matt Easton
June/July/August (#262)	Beauïse Genç	Anna Daki
June/July/August (#262)	Maya Stern	Txema Yeste
September (#263)	Taylor D.	Matt Easton
September (#263)	Aluel Keror	Jean-Baptiste Mondino
October (#264)	Léonie Cassel	Brigitte Niedermair
October (#264)	Adeng Marial	Brigitte Niedermair
October (#264)	Saffron Vadher	Brigitte Niedermair
October (#264)	Mar Gambels	Matt Easton
