= List of W Korea cover models =

W Korea is a women's beauty magazine published by Doosan Magazine under license from Condé Nast Publications. A famous person, usually an actress, singer, or model, is featured on the cover of each month's issue. Following are the names of each cover subject from the most recent issue to the first issue of W Korea under editorship of Lee Hye Joo in March 2005.

== 2000s ==
=== 2005 ===
Issue	Cover model	Photographer
March	Daria Werbowy	Steven Meisel
April	Kate Moss	Mert & Marcus
May	Renée Zellweger	Michael Thompson
June	Natalia Vodianova	Michael Thompson
July	Gisele Bündchen	Michael Thompson
August	Gisele Bündchen	Juergen Teller
September		
October	Kirsten Dunst	Mert & Marcus
November	Kate Hudson	Michael Thompson
December	Kate Moss	Mario Sorrenti

=== 2006 ===
Issue	Cover model	Photographer
January	Karen Elson	Michael Thompson
February	Jessica Stam	Tony Kim
March	Bridget Hall, Diana Dondoe, Erin Wasson, Hilary Rhoda, & Jacquetta Wheeler	David Byun
April		
May	Karolína Kurková	David Byun
June	Madonna	Steven Klein
July	Hana Soukupová	David Byun
August		
September	Natalia Vodianova	Mert & Marcus
October	Kate Moss	Mert & Marcus
November	Natalia Vodianova	Mario Testino
December	Mischa Barton	Tony Kim

=== 2007 ===
Issue	Cover model	Photographer
January		
February	Sienna Miller	Craig McDean
March	Coco Rocha, Irina Lăzăreanu, & Lisa Cant	David Byun
April	Caroline Trentini	Tony Kim
May	Kirsten Dunst	Craig McDean
June	Małgosia Bela	David Byun
July	Naomi Campbell	Steven Klein
August	Gisele Bündchen	Michael Thompson
September	Georgia Frost	Greg Lotus
October	Coco Rocha	David Byun
November	Doutzen Kroes	Tony Kim
December	Magdalena Frackowiak	Craig McDean

=== 2008 ===
Issue	Cover model	Photographer
January	Renée Zellweger & George Clooney	Michael Thompson
February		
March	Ali Stephens, Angelika Kocheva, Catherine McNeil, & Coco Rocha	David Byun
April	Scarlett Johansson & Natalie Portman	Steven Klein
May	Caroline Trentini	Greg Lotus
June	Karlie Kloss	David Byun
July		
August	Daria Werbowy; Kate Moss; Lara Stone	Bruce Weber
September	Julia Stegner	Andreas Sjödin
October	Iekeliene Stange	Greg Lotus
November	Carmen Kass	David Byun
December	Stella Tennant	Alex Cayley

=== 2009 ===
Issue	Cover model	Photographer
January	Kate Winslet	Steven Meisel
February	Christy Turlington	Mario Sorrenti
March	Agyness Deyn, Kasia Struss, Mariacarla Boscono, & Vlada Roslyakova	David Byun
April	Natasha Poly	David Byun
May	Drew Barrymore	Mert & Marcus
June	Amy Adams	Craig McDean
July	Enikő Mihalik	David Byun
July	Ginnifer Goodwin	Steven Klein
August	Bruce & Emma Willis	Steven Klein
September	Isabeli Fontana	David Byun
October	Kate Moss	Mert & Marcus
November	Lee Na-young	
December	Kang Dong Won	Choi Yong Bin

== 2010s ==
=== 2010 ===
Issue	Cover model	Photographer
January	Demi Moore	Mert & Marcus
February	Jennifer Garner	Craig McDean
March	Angela Lindvall, Anja Rubik, Karlie Kloss, & Meghan Collison	David Byun
April	Lily Donaldson	Tesh
May	Gerard Butler & Jennifer Aniston	Steven Klein
June	Valentina Zelyaeva	Jeffrey Graetsch
July	Cate Blanchett	Craig McDean
August	Freja Beha Erichsen	Craig McDean
September	Dree Hemingway	Max Farago
September	Iris Strubegger	David Byun
October	Enikő Mihalik	Thomas Schenk
November	Lee Min Ho	Lee Jun Yeop
December	Michelle Williams & Ryan Gosling	Inez & Vinoodh

=== 2011 ===
Issue	Cover model	Photographer
January	Heidi Mount	Jeffrey Graetsch
February	Jessica Stam	Catherine Servel
March	Constance Jablonski, Kasia Struss, & Mirte Maas	David Byun
April	Mila Kunis	Craig McDean
May	Mia Wasikowska & Michael Fassbender	Jean-Baptiste Mondino
June	January Jones	Craig McDean
July	Raquel Zimmermann	Willy Vanderperre
August	Daria Strokous	David Byun
September	Shin Min-a	Yelena Yemchuk
October	Monika Jagaciak	Steven Pan
November	Lindsey Wixson	Phil Poynter
December	Hailey Clauson	Catherine Servel

=== 2012 ===
Issue	Cover model	Photographer
January	Elle & Dakota Fanning	Mario Sorrenti
February	Amanda Seyfried	David Slijper
March	Anais Mali, Crystal Renn, Hanne Gaby Odiele, Hyoni Kang, Julia Nobis, Maryna Linchuk, & Valerija Kelava	Hong Jang-hyun
April	Sigrid Agren	Dusan Reljin
May	Kasia Struss	David Byun
June	Candice Swanepoel	Mario Sorrenti
July	Kate Moss	Mert & Marcus
August	Joan Smalls	Steven Pan
September	Edie Campbell	Patrick Demarchelier
October	Daphne Groeneveld	Greg Kadel
November	Suvi Koponen	Mert & Marcus
December	Constance Jablonski	Catherine Servel

=== 2013 ===
Issue	Cover model	Photographer
January	Marion Cotillard	Tim Walker
February	Keira Knightley	Steven Klein
March	Mia Wasikowska	Hong Jang-hyun
April	Meghan Collison	Alexi Lubomirski
May	Sigrid Agren	Alexi Lubomirski
June	Snejana Onopka	Mert & Marcus
July	Olga Sherer	Greg Lotus
August	Tilda Swinton	Sølve Sundsbø
September	Julia Nobis	Santiago & Mauricio Sierra
October	Cara Delevingne	Mert & Marcus
November	Bette Franke	Catherine Servel
December	Iselin Steiro	David Byun

=== 2014 ===
Issue	Cover model	Photographer
January	G-Dragon	Hong Jang-hyun
February	Catherine McNeil	Hong Jang-hyun
March	Karlie Kloss	Emma Summerton
April	Magdalena Frackowiak	Mark Abrahams
May	Hyun Bin	Cho Sun Hee
June	Miley Cyrus	Mert & Marcus
July	Yoo Ah-in	Hong Jang-hyun
August	Daria Strokous	Santiago & Mauricio Sierra
September	Georgia May Jagger	Maciek Kobielski
October	Adriana Lima	Inez & Vinoodh
November	Taeyang & T.O.P	Hong Jang-hyun
December	Natasha Poly	Mario Testino

=== 2015 ===
Issue	Cover model	Photographer
January	Daan van der Deen; Daria Werbowy; Kate Moss; Lara Stone; Raquel Zimmermann	Mert & Marcus
February	Sam Rollinson	Cass Bird
March	Rihanna	Dennis Leupold
April	Amanda Murphy	Paola Kudacki
May	Lee Min Ho	Kim Young-jun
June	Gisele Bündchen	Terry Richardson
July	Daria Werbowy	Collier Schorr
August	Małgosia Bela	Ezra Petronio
September	Lara Stone	Luigi & Iango
October	Kate Upton	Norman Jean Roy
November	Jeon Do Yeon & Gong Yoo	Hong Jang-hyun
December	Sasha Pivovarova	Emma Summerton

=== 2016 ===
Issue	Cover model	Photographer
January	Ha Jeong Woo	Kim Young-jun
February	Hanne Gaby Odiele	David Slijper
March	Kendall Jenner	Inez & Vinoodh
April	Toni Garrn	Sofia Sanchez & Mauro Mongiello
May	Bella Hadid	Terry Richardson
June	Song Hye Kyo	Hong Jang-hyun
July	Baekhyun	Yoon Suk Moo
July	Chanyeol	Yoo Young Gyu
July	Chen	Sin Seon Hye
July	D.O.	Kim Hyun Sung
July	Kai	Park Ji Hyuk
July	Lay	Kim Hyung Sik
July	Sehun	Han Jong Chul
July	Suho	Kim Hee June
July	Xiumin	Kim Ji Yang
August	Edie Campbell	Ben Weller
September	Karlie Kloss	Luigi & Iango
October	Karmen Pedaru	Hong Jang-hyun
November	Rihanna	Steven Klein
December	Gigi Hadid	Luigi & Iango

=== 2017 ===
Issue	Cover model	Photographer
January	Bella Hadid	Venetia Scott
February	Heather Kemesky	Carlotta Manaigo
March	Song Hye Kyo	Kim Young-jun
March	Yoo Ah In	Kim Hee June
April	Soo Joo Park	Hong Jang-hyun; Kim Hee June; Kim Young-jun
May	Song Joong Ki	Hwang Sang Juni
June	CL	Hong Jang-hyun
July	Kim Soo Hyun	Jang Duk-hwa
August	Girls' Generation	Yoo Young Kyu
September	Kendall Jenner	Patrick Demarchelier
October	Binx Walton	Laurie Bartley
November	Hyun Ji Shin; HoYeon Jung; Sup Park; Sung Jin Park; Ji Hye Park; Irene Kim; Tae Eun Bang; Sora Choi; EZ; Jin Park; Yoon Young Bae; Yong Soo Jeong	Yoo Young Kyu
December	Lara Stone	Matt Easton

=== 2018 ===
Issue	Cover model	Photographer
January	Shin Min-a	Hong Jang-hyun
February	Yuna Kim	Kim Hee June
March	Adwoa Aboah	Patrick Demarchelier
April	Gong Hyo Jin	Hong Jang-hyun
May	Jessica Jung; Krystal Jung	Sun Hye Shin
June	Bae Doona	Jung Wook Neck
July	Ha Jeong Woo; Jung Woo Sung; Lee Jung Jae	Hong Jang-hyun
August	Jung Hae In	Kim Hee June
September	Dylan Fender; Honza Stiborek; Hyun Ji Shin; Kay Smetsers; Lina Hoss; Lucas Cristino; Sarah Wilson; Tae Eun Bang; Yoon Young Bae	Tierney Gearon
October	Kim Tae-ri	Hong Jang-hyun
November	Jennie	Hong Jang-hyun
December	Grace Elizabeth	Brianna Capozzi

=== 2019 ===
Issue	Cover model	Photographer
January	Tilda Swinton	Tim Walker
February	Vittoria Ceretti	Benjamin Lennox
March	Sora Choi; Troye Sivan	Billy Kidd
April	Kelsey Asbille; Indya Moore; Kelela	Tom Munro
May	Lee Sung Kyung	Sin Seon Hye
June	Suzy	Kim Young-jun
July	Chanyeol; Sehun	Jang Duk-hwa
August	Shin Hyun Ji; Jung Ho Yeon; Yoon Young Bae	Sin Seon Hye
September	Kai	Mok Jung-wook
September	Sunmi	Jo Ki Seok
October	Kendall Jenner	Hugo Comte
November	Son Heung-min	Hong Jang-hyun

== 2020s ==
=== 2020 ===
Issue	Cover model	Photographer	Ref.
January	Gong Yoo	Hong Jang-hyun	
February	Jennie	Ahn Joo-young	
March	Gong Hyo-jin	Mok Jung-wook	
March	Yoo Ah-in	Kim Jae-hoon	
April	IU	Kim Hee June	
May	Baekhyun	Kim Young-jun	
June	Lee Dong-wook	Shin Sun Hye	
July	Sora Choi	Hyea W. Kang	
August	Jun Ji-hyun	Ahn Joo-young	
September	Bae Doona	Jang Duk-hwa	
October	Rosé	Kim Hee June	
November	Jennie	Hong Jang-hyun	
December	Kang Daniel; Gray; Kim Da-mi; Kim Min-ju; Kim Young-kwang; Park Min-young; Park Shin-hye; Sandara Park; Seulgi; Irene; Ahn Bo-hyun; Ahn So-hee; Lee Je-hoon; Im Soo-jung; Jang Won-young; Jang Yoon-ju; Jeon Somi; Krystal Jung; Jung Hae-in; Jessica Jung; Cha Eun-woo; Taemin; Han Ji-min; Han Hyo-joo; Henry Lau	Kim Young-jun	

=== 2021 ===
Issue	Cover model	Photographer	Ref.
January	Song Hye-kyo	Hong Jang-hyun	
February	Jisoo	Kim Hee June	
March	Hwasa	Jang Duk-hwa	
March	Baekhyun	Jang Duk-hwa	
April	IU	Kim Hee June	
May	Rosé	Kim Hee June	
June	Kim Seon-ho	Ahn Joo-young	
July	Park Seo-joon	Hyea W. Kang	
August	Lisa	Kim Hee June	
September	Jeon Somi	Kim Hee June	
September	Mino	Kim Hee June	
October	Kim Jung-hwan; Gu Bon-gil; Kim Jun-ho; Oh Sang-uk	Shin Sun-hye	
November	Jennie	Mok Jung-wook	
December	Song Kang	Park Jong-ha	
December	Hwasa	Park Jong-ha	
December	Krystal Jung	Jang Duk-hwa	
December	Cha Eun-woo	Park Jong-ha	
December	Hwang Min-hyun	Kim Shin-ae	
December	Park So-dam	Jang Duk-hwa	
December	Rozy	Kim Young-jun	
December	Jung Hae-in	Kim Young-jun	
December	Jeon Yeo-been	Mok Jung-wook	
December	Kai	Hyea W. Kang	
December	Aespa	Jang Duk-hwa	
December	HoYeon Jung	Park Jong-ha	
December	Sehun	Hyea W. Kang	

=== 2022 ===
Issue	Cover model	Photographer	Ref.
January	Enhypen	Jang Duk-hwa	
February	Taeyong	Go Won-tae	
March	Bae Doona	Mok Jung-wook	
March	Cha Eun-woo	Go Won-tae	
April	Han So-hee	Less (Kim Tae-kyun)	
May	Hyun Ji Shin; Chloe Oh	Kim Young-jun	
May	Doyoung	Jang Duk-hwa	
June	Kim Da-mi	Park Jong-ha	
June	Zico	Park Jong-ha	
July	Jennie	Hong Jang-hyun	
August	J-Hope	Mok Jung-wook	
September	Yoon Young Bae	Kim Shin-ae	
September	Son Suk-ku	Kim Shin-ae	
October	Lee Jung-jae	Hong Jang-hyun	
November	Cha Eun-woo	Mok Jung-wook	
December	NewJeans	Min Hee-jin	

=== 2023 ===
Issue	Cover model	Photographer	Ref.
Vol. 1	Chloe Oh	Park Jong-ha	
Vol. 2	Jimin	Go Won-tae	
Vol. 3	Alicia Vikander	Kim Hyung-sik	
Vol. 3	Baekhyun	Kim Shin-ae	
Vol. 4	Jeon Somi	Kim Hyung-sik	
Vol. 4	Song Kang	Kim Hyung-sik	
Vol. 5	Mark	Go Won-tae	
Vol. 6	Kim Go-eun	Mok Jung-wook	
Vol. 7	Lee Jung-jae	Hong Jang-hyun	
Vol. 7	Shin Min-a	Yoon Ji-yong	
Vol. 7	IU	Kim Shin-ae	
Vol. 7	Hanni	Go Won-tae	
Vol. 8	Lisa	Jang Duk-hwa	
Vol. 9	V	Park Jong-ha	
Vol. 10	Riize	Mok Jung-wook	
Vol. 11	Jennie	Hong Jang-hyun	
Vol. 12	Rosé	Go Won-tae	

=== 2024 ===
Issue	Cover model	Photographer	Ref.
Vol. 1	Maurizio Cattelan	Maurizio Cattelan	
Vol. 2	Hanni	Hiroshi Fujiwara; Song Si-young	
Vol. 3	Haerin	Kim Shin-ae	
Vol. 3	Tomorrow X Together	Hyea W. Kang	
Vol. 4	Jisoo	Kim Shin-ae	
Vol. 5	Amelia Gray Hamlin	Sean & Seng	
Vol. 6	Stray Kids	Kim Hee June	
Vol. 6	Bang Chan	Ju Yong-gyun	
Vol. 6	Lee Know	Kim Shin-ae	
Vol. 6	Changbin	Jang Duk-hwa	
Vol. 6	Hyunjin	Park Jong-ha	
Vol. 6	Han	Pak Bae	
Vol. 6	Felix	Kim Hee June	
Vol. 6	Seungmin	Go Won-tae	
Vol. 6	I.N	Mok Jung-wook	
Vol. 7	Julianne Moore	Pak Bae	
Vol. 7	Han So-hee	Kim Shin-ae	
Vol. 7	Carla Bruni	Hyea W. Kang	
Vol. 7	Im Yoon-ah	Mok Jung-wook	
Vol. 7	Anja Rubik	Mok Jung-wook	
Vol. 8	Jaehyun	Hyea W. Kang	
Vol. 8	Karina	Pak Bae	
Vol. 9	Oh Sang-uk	Park Jong-ha	
Vol. 9	Go Min-si	Go Won-tae	
Vol. 9	Koo Kyo-hwan	Kim Shin-ae	
Vol. 9	Kim Hyun-joo	Kim Hee June	
Vol. 9	Kim Hee-ae	Pak Bae	
Vol. 9	Ryu Jun-yeol	Park Jong-ha	
Vol. 9	Seo Hyun-jin	Ahn Sang-mi	
Vol. 9	Ahn Eun-jin	Go Won-tae	
Vol. 9	Lee Yoo-mi	Kim Hee June	
Vol. 9	Jeon So-nee	Choi Na-rang	
Vol. 9	Chun Woo-hee	Kim Shin-ae	
Vol. 10	Hoyong Kim	Pak Bae	
Vol. 10	Han Ji	Pak Bae	
Vol. 10	Byungman H	Pak Bae	
Vol. 11	Jennie	Yoon Songyi	
Vol. 12	Ever Anderson	Peter Ash Lee	

=== 2025 ===
Issue	Cover model	Photographer	Ref.
Vol. 1	Kim Go-eun	Park Jong-ha	
Vol. 2	Lee Jung-jae	Hong Jang-hyun	
Vol. 2	Lee Byung-hun	Hong Jang-hyun	
Vol. 2	Im Si-wan	Choi Na-rang	
Vol. 2	Kang Ha-neul	Choi Na-rang	
Vol. 2	Park Gyu-young	Kim Shin-ae	
Vol. 2	Lee Jin-wook	Park Jong-ha	
Vol. 2	Park Sung-hoon	Mok Jung-wook	
Vol. 2	Jo Yu-ri	Kim Hee June	
Vol. 3	Lisa	Peter Ash Lee	
Vol. 3	J-Hope	Park Jong-ha	
Vol. 3	Gong Yoo	Park Jong-ha	
Vol. 4	Meovv	Kim Hee June	
Vol. 4	Byeon Woo-seok	Park Jong-ha	
Vol. 5	Seungmin	Jang Duk-hwa	
Vol. 5	Winter	Yoon Ji-yong	
Vol. 5	Kai	Kim Shin-ae	
Vol. 5	Peggy Gou	Hong Jang-hyun	
Vol. 5	Riize	Choi Na-rang	
Vol. 5	Ningning	Mok Jung-wook	
Vol. 6	Selena Gomez	Mert Alas and Marcus Piggott	
Vol. 7	Charlotte Gainsbourg	Peter Ash Lee	
Vol. 7	Han So-hee	Go Won-tae	
Vol. 7	Kim Min-ha	Pak Bae	
Vol. 7	Daisy Edgar-Jones	Mok Jung-wook	
Vol.8	Kristen McMenamy	Sean & Seng	
Vol.9	V	Jong Ha Park	
Vol. 10	Park Chan-wook, Son Ye-jin	Ahn Ju-young	
Vol. 10	Ju Ji-hoon	Mok Jeong-wook	
Vol. 10	Han Ji-min	Kim Hee-jun	
Vol. 10	Im Yoon-ah	An Sang-mi	
Vol. 10	Song Joong-ki	Ahn Ju-young	
Vol. 10	So Ji-sub	Kim Young-jun	
Vol. 10	Kim Woo-bin	Mok Jeong-wook	
Vol. 10	Go Hyun-jung	Kim Young-jun	
Vol. 11	G-Dragon	Kim Hee June	
Vol. 12	Han So-hee	Park Jong-ha	

=== 2026 ===
Issue	Cover model	Photographer	Ref.
Vol. 1	AllDay Project	Kim Shin-ae	
Vol. 2	Dokyeom	Go Won-tae	
Vol. 2	Kazuha	Go Won-tae	
Vol. 3	Jun Ji-hyun	Peter Ash Lee	
Vol. 3	Shin Min-a	Park Jong-ha	
Vol. 3	Jung Ho-yeon	Kim Shin-ae	
Vol. 3	Gong Yoo	Kim Hee-jun	
Vol. 4	Kim Go-eun	Mok Jeong-wook	
Vol. 5	Meovv	Park Hyun-kyung, Nikolai An, LESS, Park Jong-ha, Choi Na-rang	
Vol. 6	Cortis	Go Won-tae, Choi Na-rang, Park Bae, Kim Hee-jun, LESS	
Vol. 7	Kim Do-yeon	Park Bae	
Vol. 7	Charlotte Le Bon	Peter Ash Lee	
Vol. 7	Louise Trotter	Ahn Ju-young	
Vol. 7	Han So-hee	Kim Shin-ae	
Vol. 7	Woo Song-ah	Ahn Ju-young	
Vol.8	Jaehyun	Go Won-tae	
Vol.9	Jisoo	Choi Na-rang	

== See also ==
- List of W cover models
- List of W China cover models
