= List of Numéro Russia cover models =

This list of Numéro Russia cover models is a catalog of cover models who have appeared on the cover of the Russian edition of Numéro magazine, starting with the magazine's first issue in March 2013.

== 2013 ==
Issue	Cover model	Photographer
#1. March	Naomi Campbell	Sebastian Kim
#2. April	Daphne Groeneveld	Sebastian Kim
#3. May	Ashleigh Good	Karl Lagerfeld
#4. June/July	Carolyn Murphy	Sebastian Kim
#5. August	Soo Joo Park	Todd Marshard
#6. September	Valery Kaufman	Nigel Barker
#7. October	Masha Philippova	Jonathan Becker
#8. November	Catherine McNeil	Sebastian Kim
#9. December/January	Hilary Rhoda	Sebastian Kim

== 2014 ==
Issue	Cover model	Photographer
#10. February	Franzi Mueller	Francesco Carrozzini
#11. March	Conrad Bromfield & Pat Cleveland	Tom Ford
#11. March	Rosie Tapner	Thanassis Krikis
#12. April	Cora Emmanuel	Francesco Carrozzini
#13. May	Hana Jiříčková	David Roemer
#14. June/July	Enikő Mihalik	Van Mossevelde + N
#14. June/July	Kätlin Aas	David Roemer
#15. August	Zuzanna Bijoch	Kai Z. Feng
#16. September	Caroline Brasch Nielsen; Irene Hiemstra	Warren Du Preez and Nick Thornton Jones
#17. October	Hanne Gaby Odiele	Van Mossevelde + N
#18. November	Jessica Stam	Alan Gelati
#19. December/January	Anastasia Ivanova	Alexey Kolpakov

== 2015 ==
Issue	Cover model	Photographer
#20. February	Toni Garrn	Warren Du Preez and Nick Thornton Jones
#21. March	Vlada Roslyakova	Jegor Zaika
#22. April	Meghan Collison	An Le
#23. June	Ophélie Guillermand	Warren Du Preez and Nick Thornton Jones
#24. July/August	Samantha Gradoville	Federico De Angelis
#25. September	Yumi Lambert; Anastasia Sergutko	Gianluca Fontana
#26. October	Taylor Hill	An Le
#27. November	Chiharu Okunugi	Alexandra Sophie
#28. December/January	Sabrina Ioffreda	Fanny Latour-Lambert

== 2016 ==
Issue	Cover model	Photographer
#29. February	Zemfira	Elena Sarapultseva
#30. March	Madison Stubbington	John Akerhurst
#31. April	Yana Dobroliubova	Sylwana Zybura
#32. May/June	Dree Hemingway	Drew Jarrett
#33. July	Eugenia Volodina	Gyome Dos Santos
#33. August	Mia Stass	Francesco Vincenti
#34. September	Cayley King; Rebecca Longendyke; Emmy Rappe	Hao Zeng
#35. October	Catherine McNeil	An Le
#36. November	Daria Strokous	Hugh Lippe
#37. December/January	Jena Goldsack	Ellen von Unwerth

== 2017 ==
Issue	Cover model	Photographer
#38. February	Sarah Brannon	Marie Schuller
#39. March	Amanda Murphy	Hong Jang Hyun
#40. April	Lina Hoss	Lukasz Pukowiec
#41. May/June	Nadezhda Karpova	Hong Jang Hyun
#42. July/August	Enikő Mihalik	Egor Tsodov
#43. September	Ajak Deng	Egor Tsodov
#43. September	Magdalena Frackowiak	Lukasz Pukowiec
#44. October	Anna de Rijk	Carlijn Jacobs
#45. November	Amanda Murphy	Alexander Saladrigas
#46. December/January	Catherine McNeil	Jordan Hemingway

== 2018 ==
Issue	Cover model	Photographer
#47. February	Luna	Elizaveta Porodina
#48. March	Johnny Depp	Jean-Baptiste Mondino
#49. April	Hannah Ferguson; Luz Pavon; Stella Maxwell	An Le
#50. May/June	Amber Witcomb	Rodrigo Carmuega
#51. July/August	Leda Smirnova; Unia Pakhomova; Sonia Komarova; Sasha Komarova + 2 unknown male models	Emmie America
#52. September	Marjan Jonkman	An Le
