= List of Numéro Korea cover models =

This list of Numéro Korea cover models is a catalog of cover models who appeared on the cover of the Korean edition of Numéro magazine, published between August 2008 and February 2010.

== 2008 ==
| Issue | Cover model | Photographer |
|---|---|---|
| #1. August | Sasha Pivovarova | Sofia Sanchez & Mauro Mongiello |
| #2. September | Freja Beha Erichsen | Dusan Reljin |
| #3. October | Hilary Rhoda | David Vasiljevic |
| #4. November | Doutzen Kroes | Dusan Reljin |
| #5. December | Abbey Lee Kershaw | David Vasiljevic |

== 2009 ==
| Issue | Cover model | Photographer |
|---|---|---|
| #6. January | Anja Rubik | Liz Collins |
| #7. February | Tanya Dziahileva | Sofia Sanchez & Mauro Mongiello |
| #8. March | Ali Stephens | Dusan Reljin |
| #9. April | Angela Lindvall | Matthias Vriens |
| #10. May | Karmen Pedaru & Abbey Lee Kershaw | Mariano Vivanco |
| #11. June | Edita Vilkevičiūtė | Sebastian Kim |
| #12. July | Maryna Linchuk | Sebastian Kim |
| #13. August | Carmen Kass | Dusan Reljin |
| #14. September | Alana Zimmer | Sofia Sanchez & Mauro Mongiello |
| #15. October | Jessica Stam | Mariano Vivanco |
| #16. November | Caroline Trentini | Liz Collins |
| #17. December | Snejana Onopka | Mariano Vivanco |

== 2010 ==
| Issue | Cover model | Photographer |
|---|---|---|
| #18. February | Hanne Gaby Odiele | Lina Scheynius |
