= Russh =

Australian fashion magazine

- Editor: Jess Blanch
- Categories: Women, culture, style, fashion
- Total circulation: 25,000
- First issue: October 2004
- Company: RUSSH Media
- Country: Australia
- Based in: Sydney
- Language: English
- Website: russh.com

RUSSH is a quarterly, independent Australian fashion magazine established in 2004. The magazine primarily focuses on fashion, art and music. In 2018, Russh was listed by StyleCaster as one of the "21 International Fashion Magazines That Should Be on Your Radar."

== History ==
Russh was launched in 2004 and the first issue appeared in October 2004. In 2010 the website of the magazine was launched. It is published four times per year. The magazine previously published an international edition in Japan.

Russh exclusively uses fashion models for its covers. Past cover models have included Cara Delevingne, Julia Nobis, Daul Kim, Alessandra Ambrosio, Tony Ward, Karlie Kloss, Hannah Holman, Jacquelyn Jablonski, Ali Stephens, Karmen Pedaru, Constance Jablonski, Catherine McNeil, Ashley Smith, Devon Aoki and Enikő Mihalik.

Maddie Ziegler was its first digital cover model in 2022.
