= List of W China cover models =

This list of W China cover models (2023–present) is a catalog of cover models who have appeared on the cover of the W China, the Chinese edition of W Magazine.

== 2020s ==
=== 2023 ===
Issue	Cover model	Photographer	Ref.
Vol. 1	Gong Li	Feng Hai	
Vol. 1	Isabelle Huppert	Feng Hai	
Vol. 2	Fei Fei Sun	Zeng Wu	
Vol. 2	Shu Qi; Chang Chen	Hirokazu Kore-eda	
Vol. 3	Liu Wen	Leslie Zhang	
Vol. 3	Naomi Campbell	Leslie Zhang	
Vol. 4	Marion Cotillard	Thurstan Redding	
Vol. 4	Anna Ewers	Sean + Seng	

=== 2024 ===
Issue	Cover model	Photographer	Ref.
Vol. 1	He Cong; Chu Wong; Lina Zhang	Zhong Lin	
Vol. 2	Loli Bahia	Julien Martinez Leclerc	
Vol. 2	Rebecca Leigh Longendyke	Julien Martinez Leclerc	
Vol. 3	Nicolas Ghesquière; Rianne van Rompaey	Alasdair McLellan	
Vol. 4	Zhang Ziyi	Yoshihiko Ueda	
Vol. 5	Gong Li	Christopher Doyle	
Vol. 6	Michelle Yeoh	Szilveszter Makó	
Vol. 6	Jessica Chastain	Zhong Lin	
Vol. 7	Liu Wen	Louise & Maria Thornfeldt	
Vol. 7	Tilda Swinton	Nikolai von Bismarck	

=== 2025 ===
Issue	Cover model	Photographer	Ref.
Vol. 1	Eva Herzigová	Hugo Comte	
Vol. 1	Chu Wong	Hugo Comte	
Vol. 1	Anne Hathaway	Zhong Lin	
Vol. 2	Zheng Qinwen	Sean + Seng	
Vol. 2	Rosé	Brianna Capozzi	
Vol. 3	Jiang Wen	Trunk Xu	
Vol. 3	Takeshi Kitano	Takeshi Hamada	
Vol. 4	Liu Wen	Paul Wetherell	
Vol. 4	Liu Wen	Nadine Ijewere	
Vol. 5	Gong Li	Feng Hai	
Vol. 6	Lulu Tenney	Zhong Lin	
Vol. 6	Angelina Kendall	Zhong Lin	
Vol. 6	He Cong	Inez & Vinoodh	
Vol. 6	Lina Zhang	Inez & Vinoodh	
Vol. 7	Shu Qi	Nick Yang	
Vol. 8	Zhang Ziyi	Zhong Lin	

=== 2026 ===
Issue	Cover model	Photographer	Ref.
Vol. 1	Penélope Cruz	Zhong Lin	
Vol. 1	Mona Tougaard	Zhong Lin	
Vol. 2	Jonathan Anderson; Lina Zhang	Juergen Teller	
Vol. 3	Liu Yifei	Chen Man	
Vol. 4	A$AP Rocky; Rocki Irish Mayers	Keizō Kitajima	
Vol. 4	Xin Zhilei	Drew Jarrett	
Vol. 4	Tao Okamoto	Rinko Kawauchi	
Vol. 4	Penelope Ternes	Sarah Blais	
Vol. 5	Liu Wen	Oliver Hadlee Pearch	
Vol. 5	Liu Wen	Zhong Lin	
Vol. 5	Karlie Kloss	Oliver Hadlee Pearch	
Vol. 5	Amanda Murphy	Zhong Lin	
Vol. 5	Lexi Boling	Zhong Lin	
Vol. 5	Jacqui Hooper	Zhong Lin	
Vol. 6	Mariacarla Boscono	Zhong Lin	

== See also ==
- List of W cover models
- List of W Korea cover models
