= Malika Louback =

Djiboutian fashion model

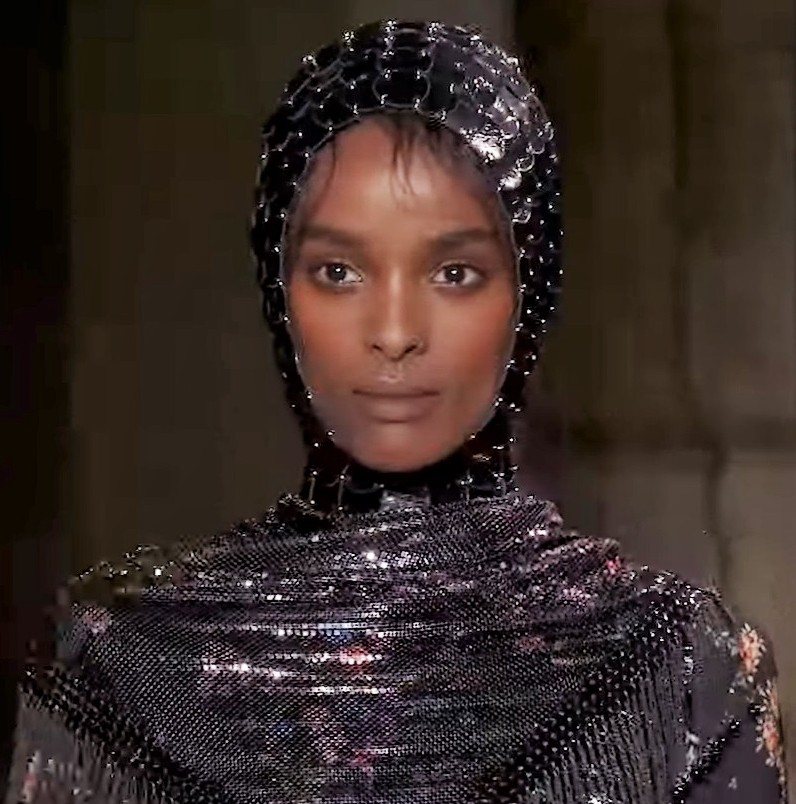
- Louback in 2020
- Born: Malika Louback-Mohamed; 1994 or 1995 (age 30–31); Djibouti
- Modeling information
- Height: 1.77 m (5 ft 9 1/2 in)
- Hair color: Black
- Eye color: Brown
- Agency: IMG Models (New York, Milan); VIVA Model Management (Paris, London); Dominique Models (Brussels)

Malika Louback-Mohamed is a Djiboutian-French fashion model and engineer. She is the first Djiboutian woman to feature on the cover of Vogue France.

== Family and engineering education ==
Malika Louback comes from Djibouti. She has two sisters. Her first name means "queen" in Arabic, and her surname means "lioness", in Afar language, one of the languages of Djibouti. Her mother is Moumina Houmed Hassan, who has been Djibouti Minister for Women and the Family since 2016, after a career in non-governmental organizations and the World Health Organization. Her father works as an engineer.

Following in her father's footsteps, Louback has three college degrees: a Diplôme universitaire de technologie in industrial and maintenance engineering, a bachelor’s degree in physics and another degree in materials science engineering. She came to Lyon in 2013, and spent six years there for her studies. She then stayed to model in Paris. Her two sisters also live in France.

== Modeling career ==
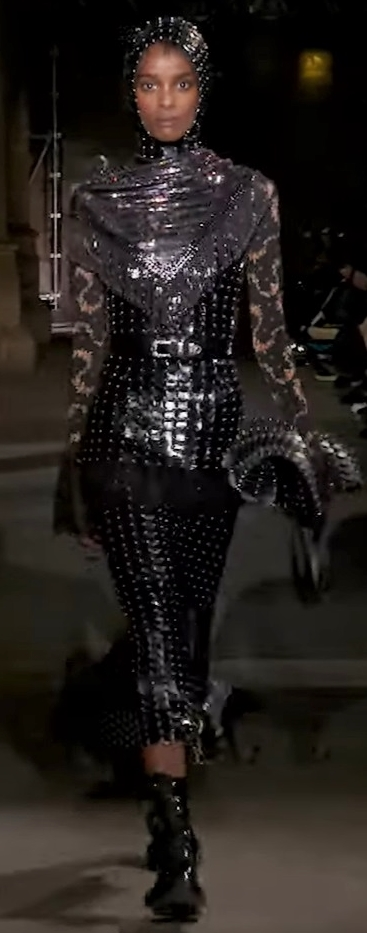
Louback walks the runway at the Paco Rabanne Fall-Winter 2020-2021 show

Louback had always wanted to be a fashion model as well as an engineer, "to have several strings to my bow", she says, and believes that her engineering experience helps her be more attentive to detail as a model. She takes her fashion inspiration from her mother, grandmother, and other Djiboutian women. She reached out to IMG Models via their website as soon as she had completed her third degree. She got an immediate call-back, and signed with them in September 2019.

In the spring/summer 2020 season Louback walked in shows for Jil Sander in Milan, Yves Saint Laurent in Paris, Chanel and Hermès. Her first magazine cover was Vogue Paris in September 2020; she was the first Djiboutian woman on that cover.

Louback spent the 2020 French pandemic lockdown in a small Paris apartment with roommates. She did the occasional FaceTime modeling shoot.

In 2021, Louback became "the face" of fashion house Loro Piana. Since 2022, she has been one of the top 50 models of Models.com. She received two Model Of The Year (MOTY) nominations; 2021 Model of the Year (Nominee) and 2020 Breakout Star (Nominee) in the Models.com Industry Awards.

She has gone on to feature on a number of magazine covers: Vogue Adria (April 2024), Elle France (September 2023), V Fall (preview 2022), Numero (April 2022), Vogue France (February 2022), Vogue Japan (September 2021) among others.

Louback is also the face of Italian luxury label Loro Piana.

== Publications ==
- Doench, Ingo; Ahn Tran, Tuan; David, Laurent; Montembault, Alexandra; Viguier, Eric; Gorzelanny, Christian; Sudre, Guillaume; Cachon, Thibaut; Louback-Mohamed, Malika; Horbelt, Niels; Peniche-Covas, Carlos; Osorio-Madrazo, Anayancy (20 February 2019). "Cellulose Nanofiber-Reinforced Chitosan Hydrogel Composites for Intervertebral Disc Tissue Repair". Biomimetics. 4 (1): E19. doi:10.3390/biomimetics4010019. ISSN 2313-7673. PMC 6477598. PMID 31105204.
