= Blésnya Minher =

Angolan fashion model (born 1998)

- Born: 22 January 1998 (age 27); Lunda Norte Province, Angola
- Modeling information
- Height: 1.76 m (5 ft 9 1/2 in)
- Hair color: Brown
- Eye color: Brown
- Agency: The Society Management (New York); Elite Model Management (Paris, Milan, Barcelona, Copenhagen)

Blésnya Minher is an Angolan fashion model.

== Early life ==
Minher was born in the village of Ngazi, located in the Lunda Norte province of Angola.

== Career ==
Minher was discovered through a casting call in Angola and after modeling locally, she was sent to Elite Model Management in France and signed to Elite's New York division The Society Management. Although Dior's S/S 2016 show was her first runway appearance, as well as shows for Kenzo, Miu Miu, and Valentino, Minher debuted as a Calvin Klein exclusive. She took notice when she appeared in a Valentino campaign alongside supermodels Christy Turlington and Liya Kebede among others, to which Vogue said "a star was born". Minher has also modeled for Chanel.

Minher has been on the cover of Vogue Brasil, Numéro, and appeared in the 2024 Victoria's Secret Fashion Show.
