= Alexandra Micu =

Romanian fashion model

- Born: Alexandra Maria Micu; Transylvania, Romania
- Occupation: Model
- Modeling information
- Height: 5 ft 10 in (178 cm)
- Hair color: Brown
- Eye color: Brown
- Agency: Ford Models (New York and Paris); Elite Model Management (Milan)

Alexandra Maria Micu is a Romanian fashion model. Her clients include: Chanel, Dior, Dolce & Gabbana, Ralph Lauren, and Versace. She has also featured in the Italian version of Elle and various international versions of Harper's Bazaar and Vogue.

Models.com has described Micu as a "hypnotic beauty."

Ford Models has described Micu as having "unforgettable presence and beauty."

== Early life ==
Micu grew up in Transylvania, Romania.

Prior to modelling, Micu spent five years on the school cheerleading team, but had to stop when she took up modelling.

Micu has stated that her parents used to say that she looked fake in photographs, but her mum would tell her that she was "really beautiful," Micu expanded that "even today when my friends take pictures of me, I don’t look nice."

== Career ==
Micu was an international finalist for the 2014 edition of the Elite Model Look, which lead to her being signed by an agency.

Micu exclusively walked for Louis Vuitton for the Fall/Winter 2016 and the Spring/Summer 2017 seasons.

Micu has twice featured in editorials for the French version of Numéro, firstly in April 2017 and subsequently in February 2019. She has also featured in an editorial for Self Service Magazine for their Spring/Summer 2017 release and for Wonderland Magazine for their Fall 2018 release.

Micu "really likes" being in front of the camera, saying "it's what I enjoy most about modelling."

== Style ==
Micu's style is influenced by her mood, which was also true as a teenager, elaborating that she was "always into clothes and playing with different patterns and prints." Micu prefers dressing "a little bit more masculine than feminine," because it makes her feel "very powerful."

== Agency representation ==
Micu is represented by Ford Models in New York and Paris, they also represent Fran Summers and Lulu Tenney.
