= Bastiaan Woudt =

Dutch photographer

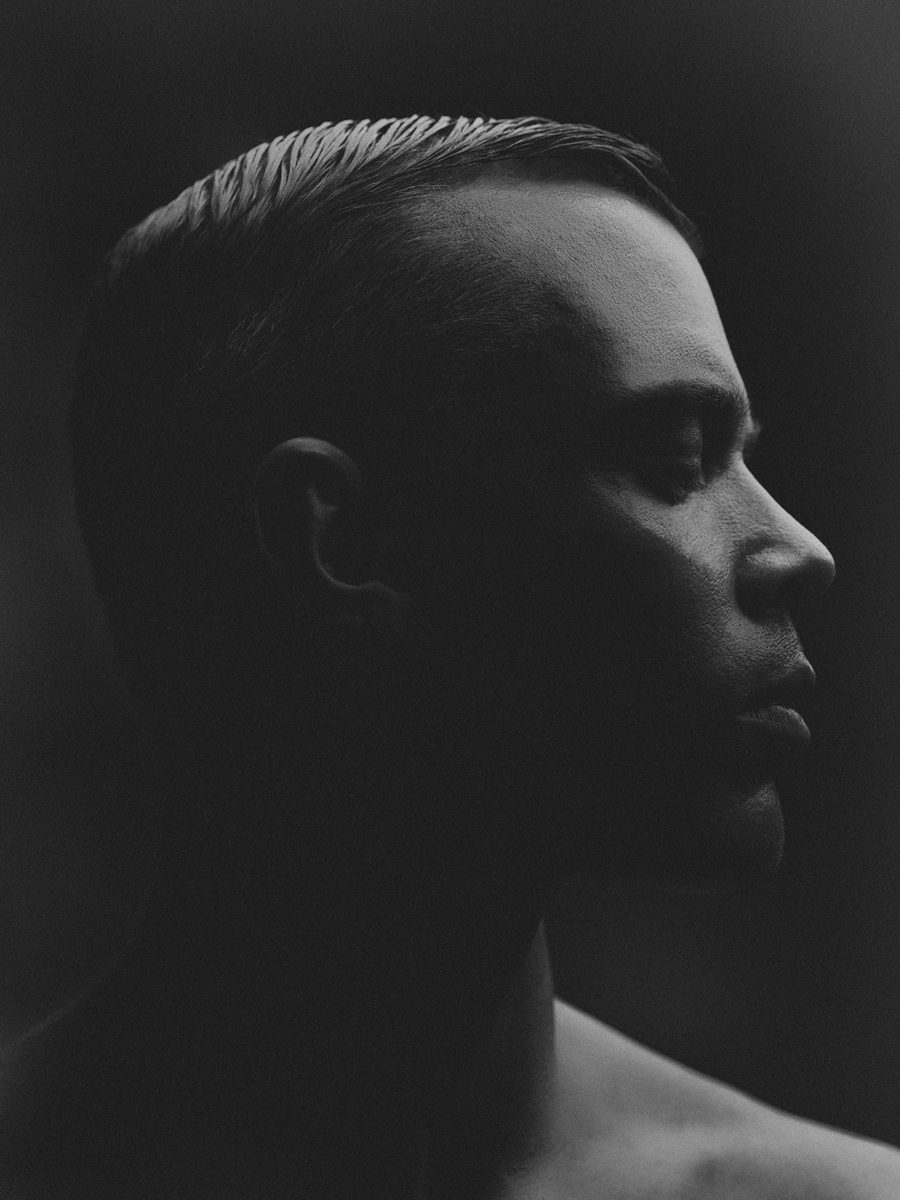
Bastiaan Woudt, Self Portrait, 2020

Bastiaan Woudt (born 1987) is a Dutch photographer and entrepreneur who resides in the Netherlands. In photography he focuses on portraits, landscapes, and still lifes.

== Biography ==
Woudt was born in Alkmaar, Netherlands. He started his career in 2011. Since then, he has published 7 books and has been featured in Volkskrant, Vogue, Harper's Bazaar, L'Officiel, Numéro, New York Magazine, and National Geographic. He is also a founder of 1605 Collective, an art platform and a publishing house.

== Work ==
Bastiaan is inspired by the work of Irving Penn and Richard Avedon. He won several International Awards notably The British Journal of Photography "Ones to watch" 2016, Van Vlissingen Art Foundation Grant 2017 and Longlist Prix Pictet 2019. His photographs were sold at auction houses Christies and Phillips Apart from the work created in his studio, Bastiaan Woudt travelled to Nepal, Morocco, and Uganda where he captured landscapes and portraits of the inhabitants which resulted in 3 books: Peak (2020), Mukono (2017), and Bastiaan Woudt in Marokko. Bastiaan Woudt is represented by the galleries: Bildhalle (Switzerland/The Netherlands), Jackson Fine Art (United States), and Atlas (United Kingdom).

== Recognition ==
Work by Bastiaan Woudt was showcased at Photo Basel, Switzerland in September, 2021 and will be exhibited at Photo London in May, 2022 which will take place at Somerset House. His first museum solo exhibition Twist took place at Kranenburgh Museum in Bergen, the Netherlands from 16 April 2022 to 18 September 2022.

== Exhibitions ==
Bastiaan Woudt's work has been exhibited in museums and at international fairs and festivals: Nordic Light Photo Festival Norway, Paris Photo, AIPAD New York, Photo London, Photo Shanghai, UNSEEN Amsterdam, and Fotografiska.
