= Couture (film) =

2025 film by Alice Winocour

- Theatrical release poster
- Directed by: Alice Winocour
- Written by: Alice Winocour
- Produced by: Angelina Jolie; Charles Gillibert; Zhang Xin; William Horberg
- Starring: Angelina Jolie; Louis Garrel; Ella Rumpf; Garance Marillier
- Cinematography: André Chemetoff
- Edited by: Julien Lacheray
- Production companies: CG Cinéma; Closer Media; Chanel; France 3 Cinéma; Canal+; Ciné+ OCS; France Télévisions
- Distributed by: Pathé (France); Vertical (United States)
- Release dates: September 7, 2025 (TIFF); February 18, 2026 (France); June 26, 2026 (United States)
- Running time: 103 minutes
- Countries: France; United States
- Languages: English; French
- Box office: $2 million

Couture (French title: Coutures) is a 2025 drama film written and directed by Alice Winocour. It stars Angelina Jolie, Louis Garrel, Ella Rumpf and Garance Marillier.

The film had its world premiere in the Special Presentations section of the Toronto International Film Festival on September 7, 2025. It received mixed reviews from critics.

== Premise ==
An American filmmaker goes on a journey as she arrives in Paris for Fashion Week. She finds out she is diagnosed with breast cancer, not just atypia.

== Cast ==
- Angelina Jolie as Maxine Walker
- Louis Garrel as Anton
- Ella Rumpf as Angèle
- Garance Marillier as Christine
- Anyier Anei as Ada
- Mona Tougaard as Mona
- Mika Schneider as Mika
- Suzy Menkes as herself
- Finnegan Oldfield as Tim le journaliste
- Vincent Lindon as the surgeon in Paris
- Aurore Clément as the woman in the hospital waiting room

== Production ==
=== Development ===
Couture is the first fictional film allowed to be shot inside Chanel's Paris, France showroom and atelier. Director Alice Winocour was given special access to the brand's fashion shows and behind-the-scenes work, including time with the seamstresses and other workers. She wanted to show the fashion world from a female and working-class point of view, rather than the usual focus on male artistic directors.

=== Casting ===
In November 2024, it was announced Angelina Jolie, Louis Garrel, Ella Rumpf, Garance Marillier, Anyier Anei and Finnegan Oldfield had joined the cast of the film, then titled Stitches, with Winocour directing from a screenplay she wrote. Principal photography began that same month in Paris. In February 2025, it was announced the film had been re-titled Couture.

== Release ==
The film screened at the 73rd San Sebastián International Film Festival on 21 September 2025. It was screened in non-competitive section 'Grand Public' of the 20th Rome Film Festival in October 2025. It served as the opening film of the 2025 QCinema International Film Festival on 14 November. It was released in France on 18 February 2026. In March 2026, Vertical acquired North American distribution rights to the film, and it is scheduled to be released on June 26, 2026.

== Reception ==
On the review aggregator website Rotten Tomatoes, 51% of 90 critics' reviews are positive, with an average rating of 5.7/10. The website's consensus reads: "A skeptical exposé on high fashion whose insights might be shallower than the industry it critiques, Couture makes its most persuasive statement through Angelina Jolie's emotionally unvarnished performance." Metacritic, which uses a weighted average, assigned the film a score of 53 out of 100, based on 17 critics, indicating "mixed or average" reviews.

Writing for Deadline Hollywood, reviewer Pete Hammond found the film to be "an engrossing study of the humanity and vulnerability of those the rest of us just might see doing their job" and calls out Jolie's performance as among the top in her career.
