= Heidi Mount =

American fashion model

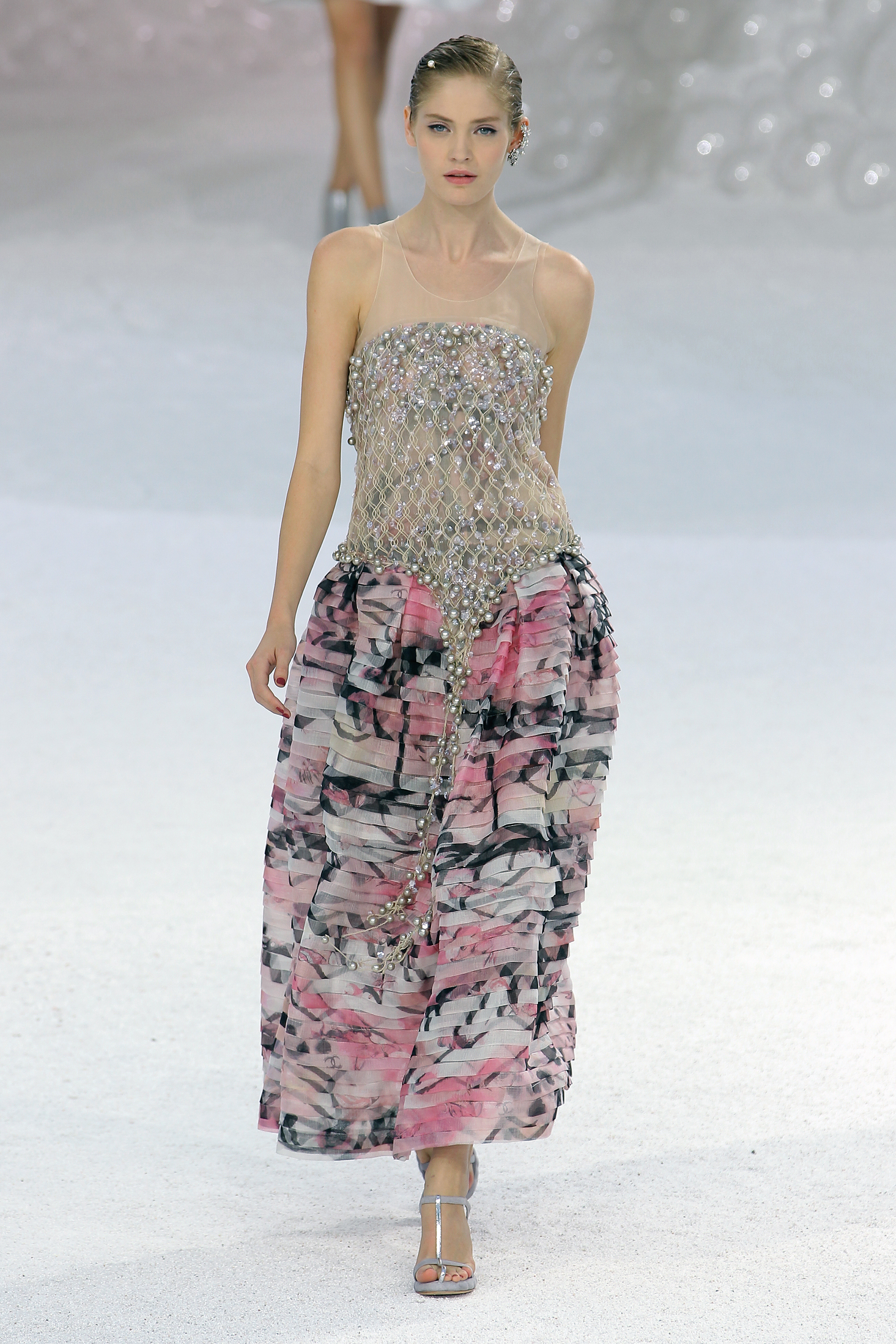
- Heidi Mount in Chanel
- Born: Heidi Whitworth; April 6, 1987 (age 39); Salt Lake City, Utah, U.S.
- Spouse(s): Shawn Mount (2007-2013)
- Modeling information
- Height: 5 ft 9.5 in (1.77 m)
- Hair color: Blonde
- Eye color: Blue
- Agency: One Management (New York); IMG Models (Paris); Traffic Models (Barcelona); Le Management (Copenhagen); Model Management (Hamburg)

Heidi Mount (née Whitworth, born April 6, 1987) is an American fashion model, modeling for fashion houses such as Michael Kors, Bottega Veneta, Sonia Rykiel, Versace, and Valentino. She has appeared in campaigns for Chanel, Prada, and Bally.

== Early life ==
Mount was born Heidi Whitworth in Salt Lake City, Utah. Mount was discovered at age 12 at a Britney Spears concert with her mother and her sister. Heidi's mother's name is Jennifer and her father is Clark. She also has four siblings: brothers Justin, Mark, Jared, and sister Bailee.

== Career ==
Mount began her modeling career in 2000, signing with Ford Models. Her debut on the international scene was in Yohji Yamamoto's Spring 2004 collection. From there, she posed for campaigns such as Frankie Morello and Armani Jeans.

Mount returned to modeling in September 2007, signing with IMG Models, and returning to runways for the Spring 2008 season, walking for designers like Shiatzy Chen, Alexander McQueen and Stella McCartney. A year later, she replaced Claudia Schiffer as the face of Chanel for Spring 2009, as well as opening and closing its fashion show. She also embraced the Spring 2009 campaigns for Alexander McQueen, ckOne, and Gap.

In an interview with The New York Times, Mount said the inspiration for her career was Christie Brinkley. At Naomi Campbell's Fashion For Relief runway show for The White Ribbon Alliance to raise funds for mothers in Haiti, she modeled a Tracey Reese dress that sold for 150 dollars. She has appeared in campaigns for Chanel, Alexander McQueen, GAP, Bally, Armani, Calvin Klein, Dolce & Gabbana, Etro, Barneys, MaxMara, H&M, Hazzys, and Moschino. She has appeared in editorials for Italian Marie Claire, W Magazine, Harper's Bazaar, V Magazine, Vanity Fair, Numéro, I-D Magazine, and Russian, Chinese, German, Italian, and Japanese Vogue.

Mount appears in the 2011 Pirelli Calendar photographed by Karl Lagerfeld.

In late 2012 she takes part in Paco Rabanne's Invictus perfume advertising campaign, impersonating a giant white goddess posing in the middle of a stadium. Suddenly the piece of fabric that was covering her breast is blown out, leaving her naked in a blanket of dark grey clouds as she touches her breast in an act of orgasm and the hero (interpreted by the Australian rugby player Nick Youngquest) returns to the locker room.

== Personal life ==
Mount married hairstylist Shawn Mount in 2007. Her husband was arrested on suspicion of rape in 2010. In 2011, Police were called to their Manhattan apartment after she claimed he was holding a knife. They separated in 2010, and divorced in 2013. She has two children.
