= Anyier Anei =

- Anyier Anei at the 2025 Toronto International Film Festival
- Occupations: model, actress
- Years active: 2022–present

Anyier Anei is a South Sudanese model and actress who gained attention through international runway and campaign work since 2022. Beyond fashion, she became known to a wider audience in 2025 for her role as "Ada" in Alice Winocour's drama Couture.

== Biography ==
Anei initially studied pharmacy in Nairobi before turning to modeling. She was scouted at the age of 16, initially declined for family reasons, and only decided to take the plunge into the international modeling industry in 2022. That same year, she relocated to Europe to pursue her career.

== Career ==
Anei made her major runway debut as a Versace exclusive model at Milan Fashion Week Fall/Winter 2022. Subsequently, she walked for Miu Miu, Gucci and Saint Laurent. She was also booked for a Valentino campaign. Further campaigns followed for Balmain, Fendi and Rhode. Her editorial work includes Les Caresses De L'Ombre in Numéro France #254 (Summer 2025). At the Chanel Haute Couture Spring 2024 show, she was noticed by French director Alice Winocour and was later chosen from over 400 models for the role of "Ada" in the feature film Couture, starring Angelina Jolie and Ella Rumpf. The film premiered at the Toronto International Film Festival.
