= Nadja Bender =

Danish model

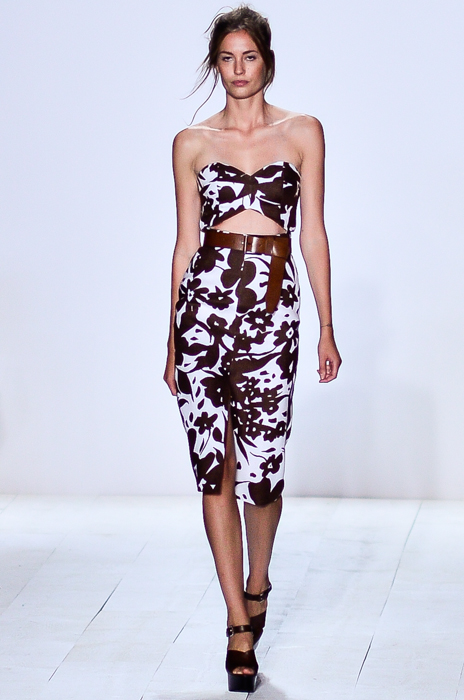
- Nadja Bender in 2014
- Born: Nadja Sofie Bender Knudsen; 3 June 1990 (age 34); Copenhagen, Denmark
- Modeling information
- Height: 1.80 m (5 ft 11 in)
- Hair color: Blonde, Brown(natural)
- Eye color: Green
- Agency: Oui Management (Paris); FASHION MODEL MANAGEMENT (Milan); Premier Model Management (London); LINE UP MODEL MANAGEMENT (Barcelona); Gossip Model Management (Copenhagen); Model Management (Hamburg)

Nadja Sofie Bender Knudsen (born 3 June 1990), known professionally as Nadja Bender is a Danish fashion model.

== Early life ==
Before modeling, she studied nanotechnology at the University of Copenhagen.

== Career ==
Bender was discovered when a neighbor contacted a modeling agent on her behalf. She started her career with New York Model Management.

She debuted in September 2011, during NYFW, walking down the runway for Alexander Wang and Rodarte. During the next year she also modeled for brands like Yves Saint Laurent, Calvin Klein, Chanel, Diane von Furstenberg, Proenza Schouler, Burberry, Versace, Gucci, Fendi, Balenciaga, Tom Ford, Dolce & Gabbana, and Christian Dior among many others.

Bender's first modeling campaign was done for Gucci. She has also done campaigns for H&M, Chanel, Fendi and Mango.
