= Sigrid Agren =

French model

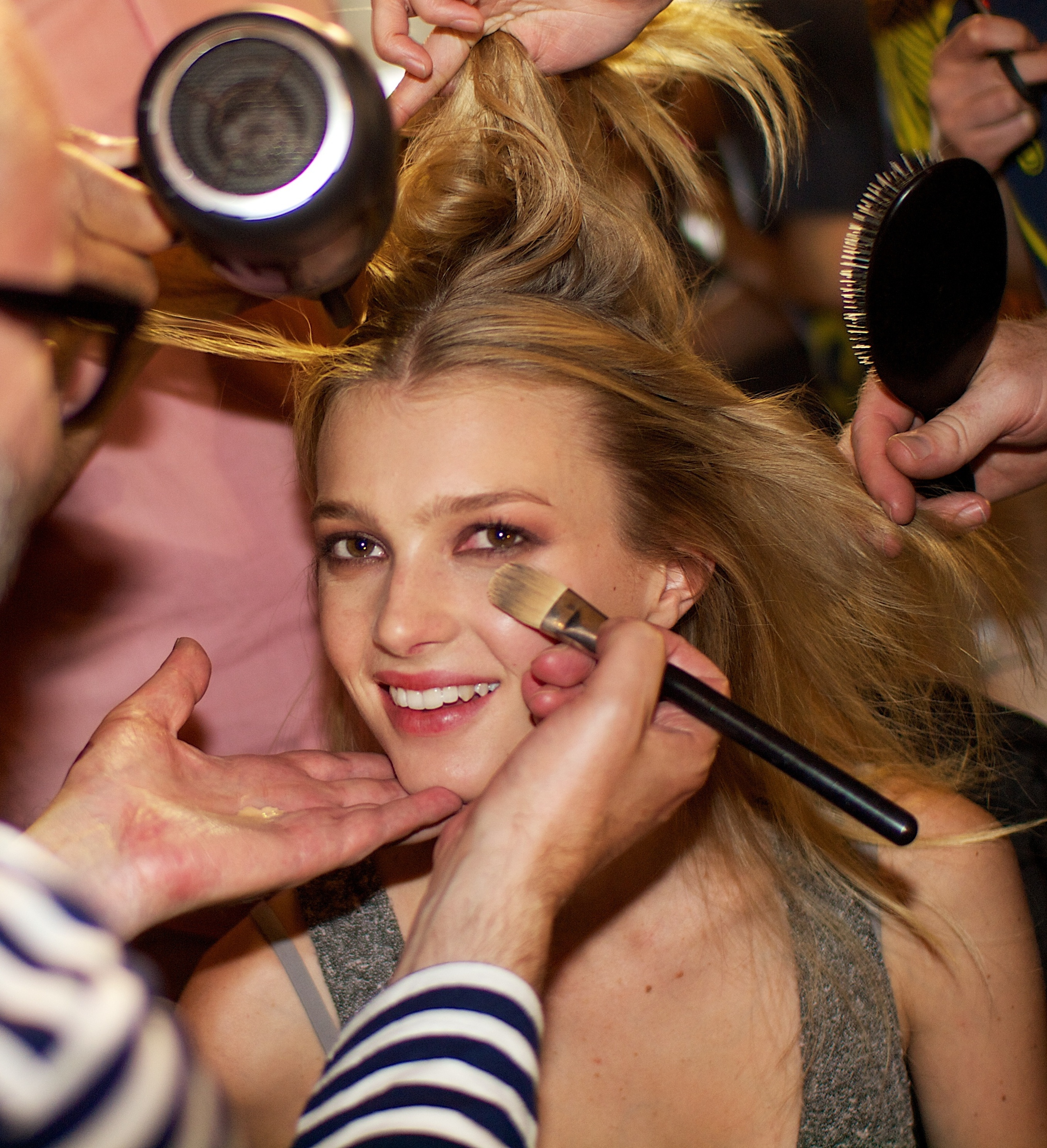
- Agren at Zuhair Murad's show
- Born: Martinique, France
- Modeling information
- Height: 1.76 m (5 ft 9 1/2 in)
- Hair color: Blonde
- Eye color: Light Brown
- Agency: The Society Management (New York); Ford Models (Paris); Elite Model Management (Milan, Copenhagen); Model Management (Hamburg); Munich Models (Munich); Way Model Management (Sao Paulo); AVE. Management (Singapore); Vivien's Model Management - Sydney (Sydney)

Sigrid Agren is a French model from Martinique, who rose to prominence during the Elite Model Look in 2006.

== Early life ==
Agren was born and raised in Martinique, to a Swedish father and a French mother. She entered the Elite Model Look in France as a teenager, and went on to the finals in Paris. She was the winner and therefore among the contestants chosen to move on to the finals in Shanghai. She lost to one of the other French finalists, Charlotte Di Calypso.

== Career ==
After the Elite Model Look ended, Agren signed with Elite Model Management in Paris. She performed small jobs before deciding to put off modeling in order to finish her education in 2007.

Agren returned to the modeling world in 2008, signing with New York Model Management. She also re-signed with Elite Models in all the major fashion capitals. She debuted on the runway by closing the Prada Resort show. For her first New York Fashion Week, she walked for Calvin Klein, Ralph Lauren, Donna Karan and Rodarte. She also opened for Shiatzy Chen, Yves Saint Laurent, Karl Lagerfeld and Alexander McQueen, and closed for Prada, Costume National and Louis Vuitton.

For the Spring/Summer 2009 season, she became the face of Prada, with Giedre Dukauskaite and Anna Jagodzińska, and also became the face of Armani Jeans and Nicole Farhi.

Agren has appeared in numerous editorials for magazines like Vogue Paris, Vogue China, Harper's Bazaar, W Korea, and Numéro. She appeared on one of the three covers of i-D's June/July issue, alongside Tasha Tilberg and Raquel Zimmermann.

She has appeared in multiple international fashion shows for designers like Armani, Chanel, Versace, Ralph Lauren, Dolce & Gabbana, Prada, Jil Sander, Gucci, and Christian Dior. She has also been featured in the shows of Valentino, Alberta Ferretti, Karl Lagerfeld, Pucci, Diane von Fürstenberg, Costume National, Marni, Ruffian, Marc by Marc Jacobs, Antonio Berardi, Balmain, and Max Azria. For the Fall/Winter 2009 season, she opened and closed for Chloé, as well as closed for Nina Ricci and Prada. She was featured as the face of Stella McCartney, replacing Kate Moss, as well as Chloé, alongside Kasia Struss and Karlie Kloss; Ck Calvin Klein alongside Jourdan Dunn, and Bottega Veneta alongside Anna Jagodzińska.

In 2009, she was ranked No. 10 on the Top 50 models-Women list. She is ranked in the "Industry Icons" and "Money Girls" list from models.com.
