= Maartje Verhoef =

Dutch fashion model (born 1997)

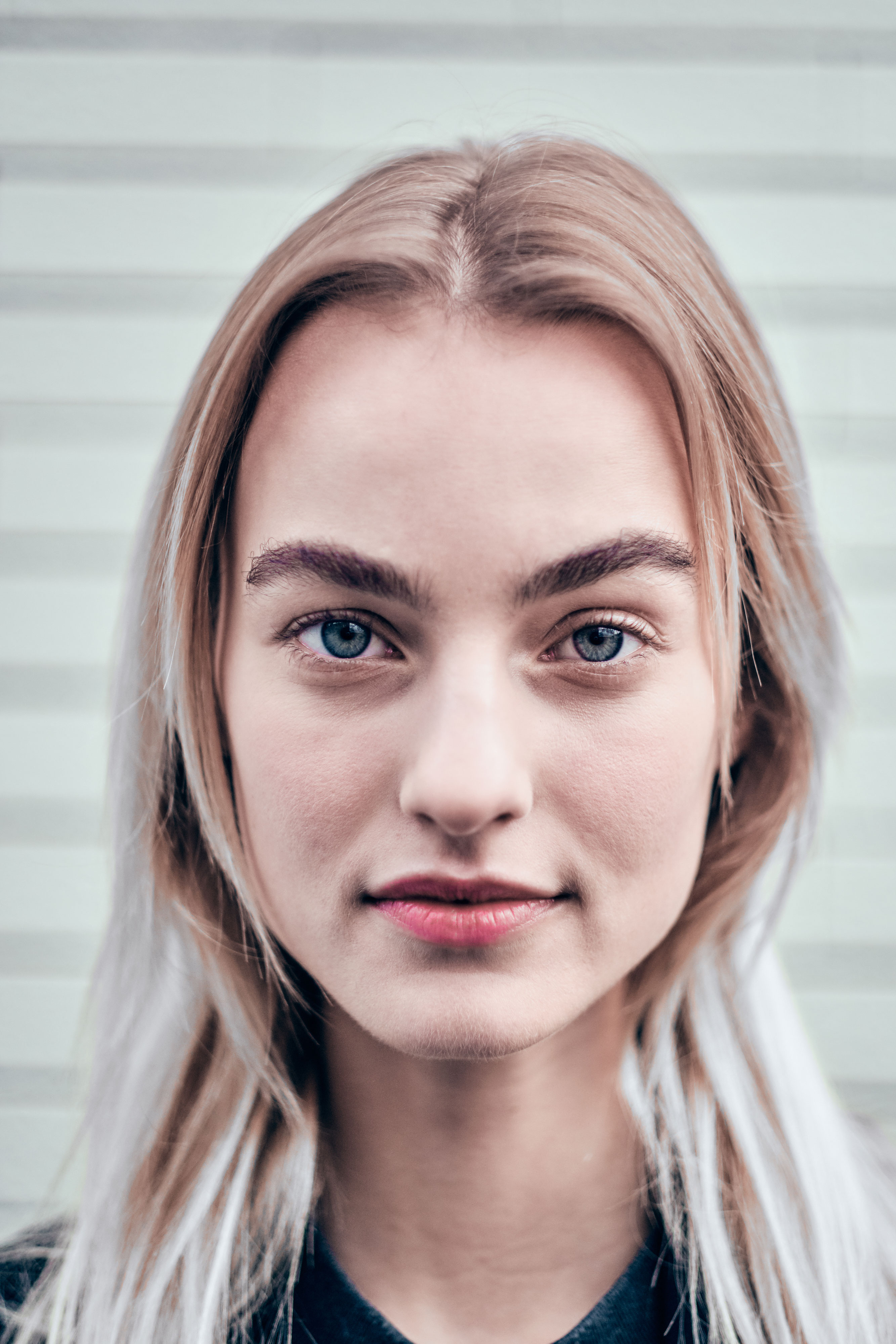
- Verhoef in 2019
- Born: 5 September 1997 (age 27); Veldhoven, Netherlands
- Modeling information
- Height: 1.79 m (5 ft 10 1/2 in)
- Hair color: Blonde
- Eye color: Blue
- Agency: Elite Model Management (New York); Oui Management (Paris); Women Management (Milan); Select Model Management (London); R1 Mgmt (Barcelona); Seeds Management GmbH (Berlin); IMM Bruxelles (Brussels); Scoop Models (Copenhagen); Modellink (Gothenburg); Modelwerk (Hamburg); Public Image Management (Montreal); Munich Models (Munich)

Maartje Verhoef (Dutch pronunciation: [ˈmaːrtɕə vərˈhuf]; born 5 September 1997) is a Dutch fashion model.

== Career ==
Maartje Verhoef was discovered when a photographer who worked at her father's company asked her to replace a model who called in sick for a photoshoot. The photographer sent the pictures to Micha Models, which would become her mother agency.

Verhoef started her fashion career in September 2012, by opening the Prada Spring/Summer 2013 runway show in Milan, as an exclusive. She also starred in the Prada ad campaign that season, shot by Steven Meisel.

She became the top walker of the Spring/Summer 2014 season, when she walked 66 runway shows.

Verhoef has walked in runway shows for the designers Calvin Klein, Ralph Lauren, Michael Kors, Alexander Wang, Oscar de la Renta, Carolina Herrera, Tommy Hilfiger, Hugo Boss, Vera Wang, Tom Ford, DKNY, Donna Karan, Jil Sander, Fendi, Armani, Max Mara, Dolce & Gabbana, Gucci, Versace, Balenciaga, Dior, Viktor & Rolf, Hermès, Miu Miu, Valentino, Louis Vuitton, Alexander McQueen, Balmain, and Chanel.

She has starred in ad campaigns for Prada, Armani, Dior, Calvin Klein, Céline, Salvatore Ferragamo, Moschino, Anna Sui, Alexander McQueen, Coach, Valentino, Gucci, Louis Vuitton, and Giuseppe Zanotti.
