= Szilveszter Makó =

Hungarian photographer (born 1992)

- Makó Szilveszter
- Born: 1991 (age 34–35); Miskolc, Hungary
- Education: Moholy-Nagy University of Art and Design
- Occupation: Fashion photographer
- Website: szilvesztermako.com

Szilveszter Makó (Hungarian: Makó Szilveszter, IPA: [ˈmɒkoː ˈsilvɛstɛr]; born 1992) is a Hungarian fashion photographer and director based in Milan, Italy, who rose to prominence for his distinctive illustrative, theatrical, and surrealist style of photography.

== Early life and education ==
Makó was born in 1992 in Miskolc, Hungary, and grew up in the nearby town of Lillafüred. In childhood he received an unconventional education, including two years at a Waldorf school, centered around arts and crafts, learning languages like Ancient Greek and Latin, and tending to plants and animals. He had first thought he wanted to be a painter. His earliest engagement with photography came from photographing emo hairstyles he did while spending time at his mother's hair salon. Instead of photographing subjects in the salon, he used unconventional outdoor settings as backdrops.

Around 2013, Makó graduated from the Moholy-Nagy University of Art and Design.

== Career ==
He began his career booking shoots with models, first in Hungary then later in Berlin then Milan, where he eventually settled.

In 2023, Makó photographed actor Willem Dafoe for the cover of GQ Italia, with the actor wearing a headpiece inspired from Makó's Farsang outfit as a kid; it became his first recurring theme in photoshoots, with variations thereof featuring Cate Blanchett and Gwendoline Christie.

Elle Fanning's January 2026 cover for Who What Wear went viral. Then, following the election of Zohran Mamdani as Mayor of New York City in 2026, Makó photographed Mamdani's wife Rama Duwaji for The Cut. The Michigan Daily, stated that the shoot captured Duwaji "in moments of stillness and strength... allowing power to appear softened rather than diminished. Her presence reads as deliberate and political." In 2026, he did well-received photoshoots with Anya Taylor-Joy (for L'Officiel) and Rihanna (for 72) as well.

In September 2026, Makó had a six-room installation during New York Fashion Week, titled "Bauhaus Ballet" and featuring portraits of Gwendoline Christie and Adrien Brody.

Makó has created photoshoots for 032c, Dazed, GQ China, GQ Italia, Harper's Bazaar Italia, L'Officiel Ukraine, L'Officiel USA, L'Officiel Vietnam, Numéro, Numéro Homme, Numéro Netherlands, Numéro Russia, Vanity Fair, Vogue Arabia, Vogue China, Vogue Czechoslovakia, Vogue Hong Kong, Vogue Portugal, W China, WWD, shot campaigns for Adidas, Ami Paris, Maison Margiela, Trussardi, and Zara.

=== Influences ===
His work is said to be a mix of surrealism, daguerrotype, theatre, German expressionism, and the Renaissance period. Specifically evoking the textures of Renaissance art, such as Leonardo da Vinci's Lady with an Ermine, Makó states that the Renaissance period is not his reference point, but admits there are undeniable overlaps. He has said that his influences are "broader and darker"—an embodiment of mid-century fine art, "complemented by the surreal and grotesque visual language of the early 20th century" and shaped by chiaroscuro. Makó has stated that he is "conservative in taste". Growing up, he was surrounded by the conservative disciplinary restrictions and rules of his grandparents with Soviet values deeply instilled in him, living among "a routine rhythm of labor and factories, built upon coal, dust, and bare brick walls". He approaches retouching with "a sense of ancient Greek idealization". Beaux Arts called his Elle Fanning covershoot for Who What Wear "fabulously Dada".

His set design influences are visualized in real by set designer and painter Edith Di Monda. The two of them have strong similar influences in their work like theatre, German expressionism.

=== Reception ===
While critics have called his photography "a revolutionary" and "a glimmer of hope", they have also argued that his style has become repetitive and overexposed.
