= Sølve Sundsbø =

Norwegian photographer

- Born: 14 October 1970 (age 55)
- Notable work: 14 Actors Acting
- Style: fashion photography

Sølve Sundsbø (born 1970) is a Norwegian fashion photographer based in London.

== Career ==
Sundsbø was born in Norway in 1970 and came to London in 1995 to study photography at the London College of Printing. He left college to work as first assistant to British photographer Nick Knight.

He regularly works with publications such as Italian Vogue, Love, Visionaire, V, Interview, i-D, The New York Times, Chinese Vogue, Vogue Nippon and W. In 2012, Sundsbø collaborated with W magazine, creating and exhibiting an installation of his film "The Ever Changing Face of Beauty".

Sundsbø's work has been in numerous exhibitions. “Beyond the Still Image” was exhibited at the Palazzo Reale in Milan as part of the 2018 Photo Vogue Festival in collaboration with Vogue Italia. "Rosie and 21 Men" was displayed at the Shoot Gallery in Oslo in 2013. The images from the exhibition were published in a catalogue, "Rosie and 21 Men," which followed his previous catalogue, "Perroquets," produced in tandem with his solo show from 2008 at Gun gallery in Stockholm. Sølve also photographed images of the Alexander McQueen archive for the catalogue of the “Savage Beauty” retrospective at the Metropolitan Museum in New York in 2011.

Sundsbø has photographed advertisements for fashion and beauty brands, including Giorgio Armani, Chanel, Cartier, Gucci, Mugler, Dolce & Gabbana, Louis Vuitton, Yves Saint Laurent, Hermes, Guerlain, Givenchy, H&M, Lancôme, Estée Lauder, Sergio Rossi and Boucheron. Additionally, he has created short films for Chanel, Gucci, Lancôme, LOVE, NYTimes, Nike and SHOWstudio. His NY Times piece titled 14 Actors Acting won an Emmy Award in the New Approaches to News & Documentary Programming: Arts, Lifestyle and Culture category at the 32nd News & Documentary Emmy Awards in 2011.

Two of Sundsbø's portraits are held in the permanent collection of the National Portrait Gallery, London.

Sundsbø created the album artwork for Coldplay's A Rush of Blood to the Head. The image was made into a stamp by Royal Mail in 2010 to celebrate the ten most iconic album sleeve artworks from the last forty years.
