= Daphne Groeneveld =

Dutch model (born 1994)

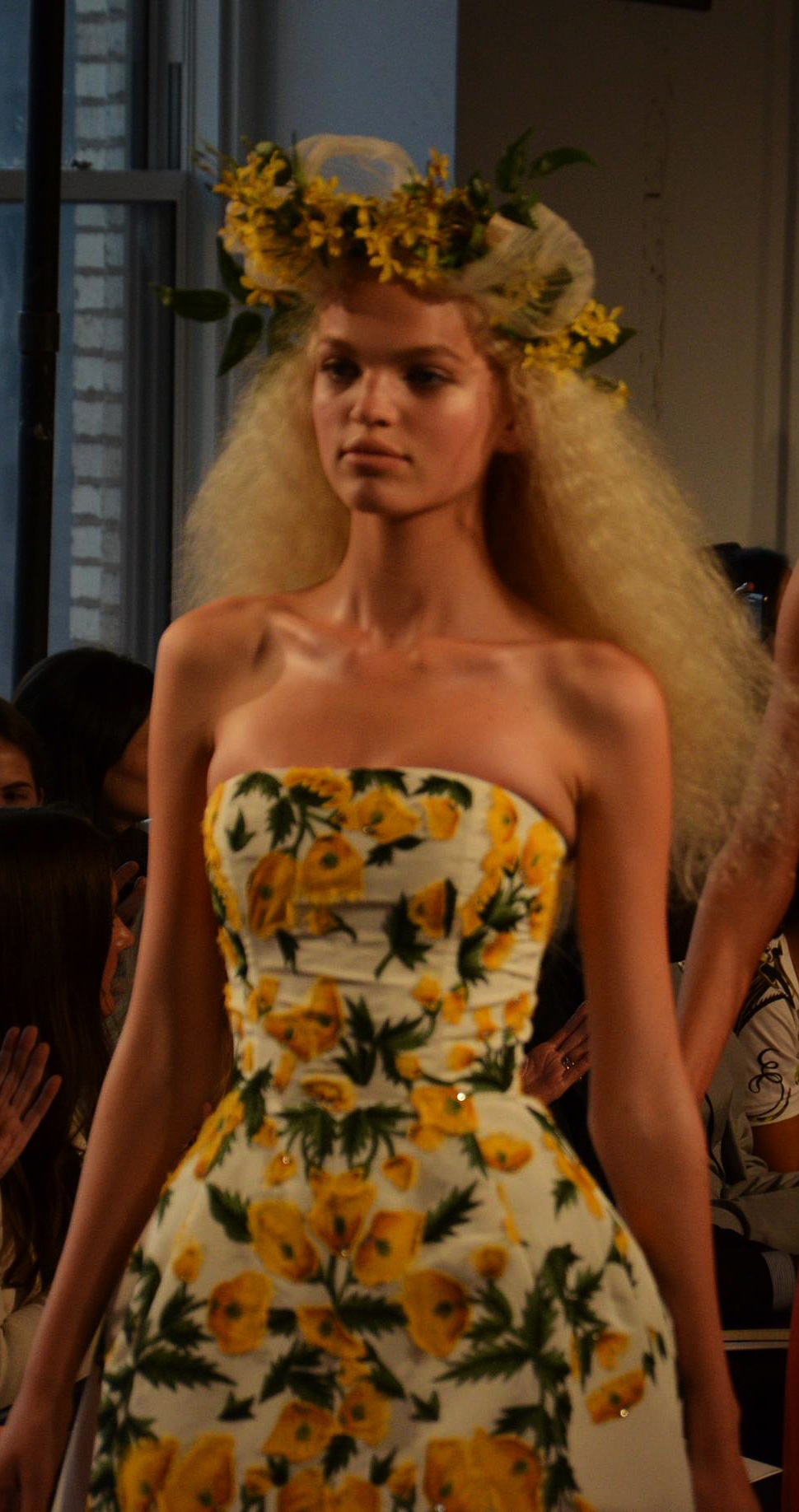
- Groeneveld in 2012
- Born: 24 December 1994 (age 31); Leiderdorp, South Holland, The Netherlands
- Years active: 2010–present
- Modeling information
- Height: 1.80 m (5 ft 11 in)
- Hair color: Blonde
- Eye color: Blue
- Agencies: The Lions (New York City); Traffic Models (Barcelona); Scoop Models (Copenhagen); Modellink (Gothenburg); Bloom Management (Amsterdam) (mother agency)

Daphne Groeneveld (born 24 December 1994) is a Dutch model best known for appearing on the 2010 December/January cover of Vogue Paris alongside Tom Ford, considered to be a supermodel by some fashion experts and magazine editors. She is currently the face of Jean Paul Gaultier Classique Fragrance and Tom Ford Beauty.

== Career ==
Groeneveld was discovered by her agent at Bloom Management, who asked if she had ever considered modeling. While her first runway season was the Fall/Winter 2010 season in Milan, her career took off after her Fall/Winter 2011 season. She was awarded the title of Best Dutch Model at the Marie Claire Netherlands Fashion Awards in 2011.

She has appeared on the covers of French, Dutch, Russian, Japanese, Korean, and Thai Vogue, British and French Elle, Spanish Harper's Bazaar, French, Russian and Japanese Numéro, V, i-D, LOVE, Glamour, Korean W and many independent magazines.

Groeneveld has walked for Gucci, Fendi, Carolina Herrera, Marc Jacobs, Anna Sui, Chanel, Donna Karan, Emilio Pucci, Etro, Max Mara, Dior, Jason Wu, John Galliano, Loewe, Karl Lagerfeld, Lanvin, Vera Wang, Dolce & Gabbana, Jil Sander, Rick Owens, Giorgio Armani, Oscar de la Renta, Louis Vuitton, Prada, Roberto Cavalli, Shiatzy Chen, Versace, Yeezy, Jeremy Scott, Jean Paul Gaultier, Moschino, Mugler, Rochas, Anna Sui to name a few.

She has appeared in advertising campaigns for Tom Ford, Miu Miu, Louis Vuitton, Givenchy, Dior, Jean Paul Gaultier, Calvin Klein, Roberto Cavalli, DSquared2, Jill Stuart, Barneys New York, H&M and Jean Paul Gaultier.

As of May 2017, she was ranked on the Money Girls ranking on Models.com.

== See also ==
- List of Vogue Paris cover models
