= Greg Kadel =

American photographer

Greg Kadel is an American fashion photographer and filmmaker based in New York City.

During the Me Too movement, Kadel was accused of sexual misconduct by several models.

== Early life and education ==
Kadel was born and raised in Pennsylvania. He moved to New York to study marine biology and fine art. It was only after graduation he realized his passion for photography and filmmaking.

== Career ==
Kadel's images have appeared in publications including American Vogue, Vogue Italia, Vogue Nippon, Vogue UK, L'Uomo Vogue, French Vogue, Vogue Germany, Vogue China, Numéro, Numéro Homme, Visionaire, i-D, The Face, Another Magazine, King Kong Harper's Bazaar, Dansk, W Jewelry, British GQ, 10 Magazine, Allure, Inside View, V, and Melody.

His advertising clients include or have included Aveda, Express, Valentino, Louis Vuitton, H&M, Max Mara, Loewe, Oscar de la Renta, Calvin Klein, Biotherm, Diane von Fürstenberg, Elie Tahari, Hermès, Lancôme, L'Oréal, Max Mara, Shiseido, Victoria's Secret, and Salvatore Ferragamo.

Kadel's celebrity clients include Britney Spears, Casey Affleck, Stella McCartney, Ioan Gruffudd, Claire Danes, Ben Chaplin, Maurizio Cattelan, Kiera Chaplin, Hedi Slimane, and Megan Fox.

== Personal life ==
Kadel spends his time between New York City, Paris, and Los Angeles.

== Sexual misconduct ==
In a February 2018 story in the Boston Globe, two women accused Kadel of sexual misconduct. As a consequence of the allegations, Kadel lost contracts with Condé Nast and Victoria's Secret. Kadel has denied the allegations.
