= Snejana Onopka =

Ukrainian model (born 1986)

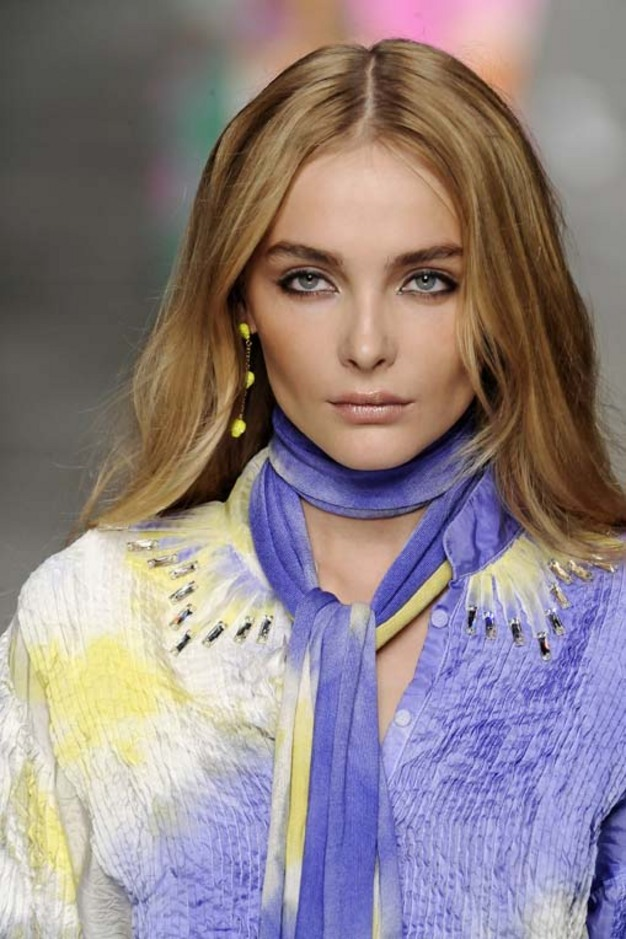
- Snejana Onopka modeling for Blumarine Spring & Summer 2010
- Born: Snijana Dmytrivna Onopko; 15 December 1986 (age 39); Severodonetsk, Ukraine SSR, Soviet Union
- Spouse(s): Mykola Shchur (m. 2011; div. 2020) Unknown (m. 2024)
- Modeling information
- Height: 1.75 m (5 ft 9 in)
- Hair color: Blonde
- Eye color: Blue
- Agencies: VNY Models (New York)

Snijana Dmytrivna Onopko (Ukrainian: Сніжана Дмитрівна Онопко; born 15 December 1986), known professionally as Snejana Onopka, is a Ukrainian model. Onopka rose to prominence after being photographed by Steven Meisel for the Prada campaign and two covers of Vogue Italia.

== Early life ==
Snejana Onopka was born on 15 December 1986 in Severodonetsk, Ukraine. In 2001, she moved to the Ukrainian capital of Kyiv. While there, Onopka was spotted by a foreign scout at the age of 15, and thus began her career as a model.

== Career ==
In 2005, Steven Meisel photographed Onopka for the Prada and Dolce & Gabbana fall ad campaigns, sparking a booking frenzy thereafter and he then photographed her for two covers of Italian Vogue. In September 2005, she debuted by closing the Marc by Marc Jacobs show in New York and also opened the Dolce & Gabbana and Karl Lagerfeld shows. In 2006, Steven Meisel photographed her for Calvin Klein and Dolce & Gabbana campaigns, Mert Alas and Marcus Piggot photographed her for a Louis Vuitton campaign and Juergen Teller photographed her for Yves Saint Laurent. The same year, Onopka became the face of Lanvin, replacing Lily Donaldson. Onopka has appeared on the cover of i-D, Numéro, Harper's Bazaar, L'Officiel, Allure Russia, Elle Ukraine, Glamour Russia and the Italian, Portuguese, Japanese, and French editions of Vogue. On the runway, Onopka has walked for designers including Chanel, Gucci, Anna Sui, Christian Dior, Versace, Balmain, Dolce & Gabbana, Marc Jacobs and Isabel Marant.

In September 2006, Onopka was mentioned in the New York Times article, "When Is Thin Too Thin?" along with fellow models Natasha Poly and Hana Soukupová.

In 2012 Onopka was featured in a Tom Ford Beauty campaign for Fall/Winter 2012/2013, she was in the campaign with the designer Tom Ford himself.

In September 2017, Onopka briefly returned to the runway and opened the Natasha Zinko show at London Fashion Week.

In 2021, Onopka took part in Alex Luna's art project Somnia Disaster, dedicated to the 35th anniversary of the Chernobyl tragedy. The presentation of the project took place on the anniversary of the tragedy on 26 April at the Star of Wormwood Civil Defence Museum in the city of Chornobyl. On 28 April at the National Conservation Area "St Sophia of Kyiv" in Kyiv. From 14 to 21 August 2021, the project was presented at the 12th Odesa International Film Festival in Odesa.

== Personal life ==
Onopka was quoted in Teen Vogue saying this about her family: "My mother collects tear sheets of everything she sees me in." And about her father: "My father was in a rock band when I was growing up, so he's used to the spotlight. I like to sing, too." According to Ukrainian media, she was previously engaged in 2009 to Ukrainian businessman Oleksandr Onyshchenko.

In 2011, Onopka married Ukrainian businessman Mykola (Nikolay) Shchur. In 2020, she stated that her husband had physically abused her throughout the marriage, while also adding that he did not agree with the divorce and wanted to take away her property.

In 2022, she moved to Riga, Latvia, due to the Russian invasion of Ukraine.

In a 2024 Instagram post, she announced that she remarried, without revealing the identity of her spouse.

Onopka speaks fluent Russian, Ukrainian, and English.
