= Catherine McNeil =

Australian fashion model (born 1989)

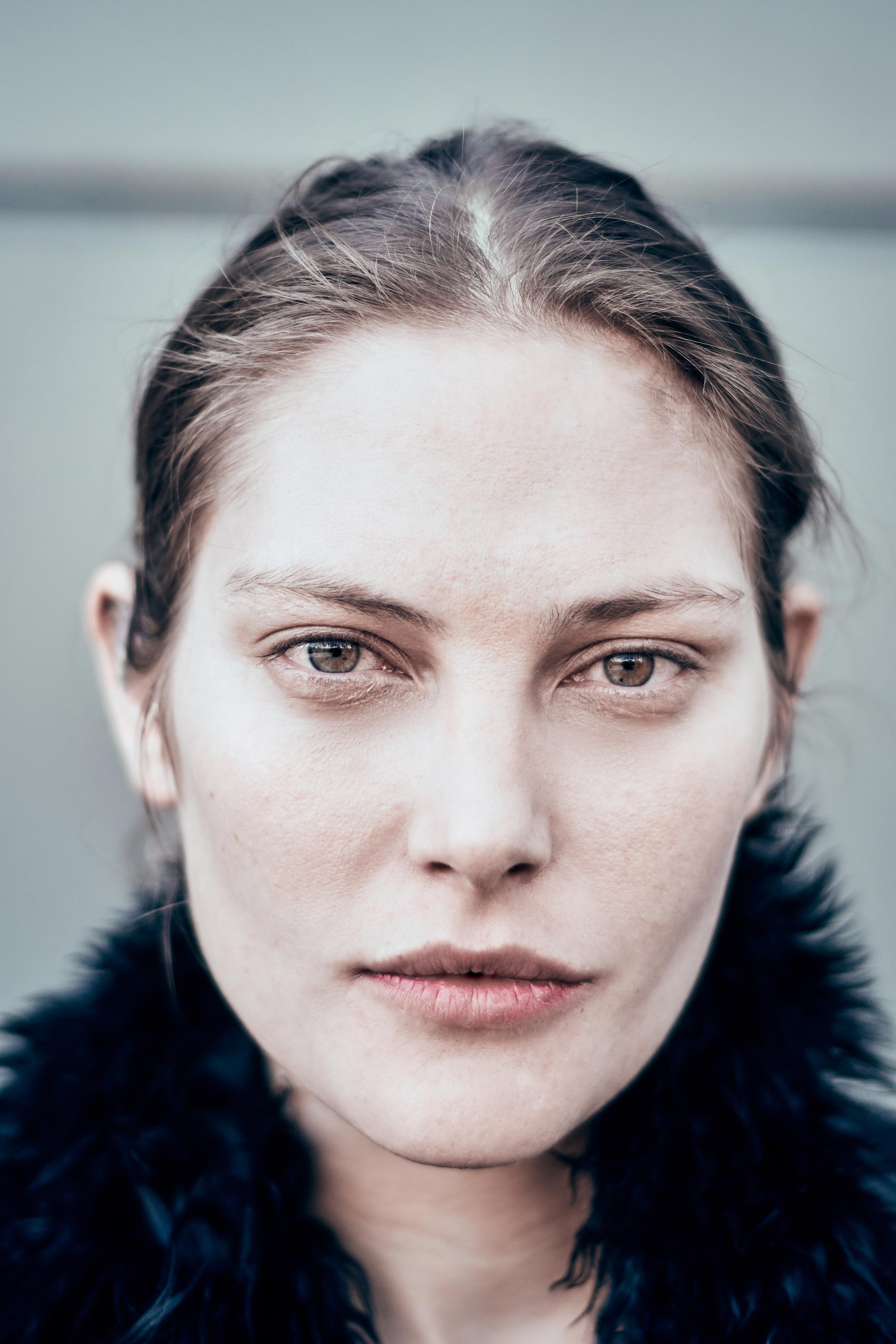
- McNeil in September 2018
- Born: 30 May 1989 (age 37) (Note: Though her birth date is often misreported to be 20 March 1989, McNeil posted a correction on her Instagram account to a Daily Mail story which inaccurately stated that she is a Pisces.); Brisbane, Queensland, Australia
- Other name: Cat McNeil
- Spouse: Miles Plumlee (m. 2023)
- Modeling information
- Height: 5 ft 11 in (1.80 m)
- Hair color: Brown
- Eye color: Green
- Agency: The Society Management (New York); Oui Management (Paris); Why Not Model Management (Milan); View Management (Barcelona); 2pm Model Management (Copenhagen); Modelwerk (Hamburg); Chic Management (Sydney)

Catherine McNeil Plumlee (born 30 May 1989) is an Australian fashion model. At fourteen years old, she won a model search contest hosted by Girlfriend. Vogue Paris declared her as one of the top 30 models of the 2000s.

== Early life ==
McNeil was born in the Brisbane suburb of Coopers Plains, Queensland; she is also a citizen by descent of New Zealand.

== Career ==
McNeil's modeling career soared to prominence in 2007. She has been featured in advertisements for D&G, Versace, Donna Karan, and Jean Paul Gaultier. She has appeared on the covers of French Vogue, Australian Vogue, V, and French Revue de Modes. McNeil appeared in many high-profile runway shows for the Fall/Winter 2007 season, including Balenciaga, Christian Dior, Fendi, Roberto Cavalli, Valentino, Versace, Louis Vuitton and Yves Saint Laurent. She also opened for Givenchy. Style.com chose her as one of the top ten models of the season.

McNeil was also signed with photographer Mario Testino for a six-month contract in 2006, whom she claims to have never heard of prior to their meeting.

Her first major cover was for V who predicted she would be a supermodel. She was photographed by Mario Testino for the D&G pre-fall campaign and the Hugo Boss Fall ad campaign in 2007. That same year, she was also the face of the Donna Karan fall ad campaign and was featured in the Versace campaign alongside Kate Moss. She opened the fall Alexander McQueen, Alessandro Dellacqua, Givenchy, and Missoni shows in Paris and Milan and closed the fall Gucci show in Milan. She was featured on Style.com's Top Ten New Faces for Fall 2007. She has appeared in advertising campaigns for Givenchy, Dior, Carolina Herrera, Gap, Narciso Rodriguez, Donna Karan, Uniqlo, Express, Louis Vuitton, Dolce & Gabbana, Hugo Boss, Printemps, Jean Paul Gaultier, Barneys New York, Versace and Hermès.

In September 2007, she appeared on the cover of French Vogue and was named one of British Vogue's "Head Girls" and a model to watch for in the upcoming season. In September 2007, she opened the Spring Carolina Herrera, Zac Posen, Thakoon, and Preen shows in New York and closed the Spring MaxMara show in Milan.

In October 2007, she closed the Spring Christian Dior show in Paris. In 2008, she was photographed for the French Vogue and Pirelli Calendar. She became the face of Jean Paul Gaultier, replacing Gemma Ward, and renewed her contract with Hugo Boss. During January 2008, she walked for the spring Chanel, Christian Dior, Christian Lacroix, Givenchy, and Jean Paul Gaultier couture shows in Paris.

She closed the Fall Belstaff, MaxMara, and Hermès shows in Milan and Paris. In 2008, she appeared on the cover of Numéro twice, as well as the cover of Australian Vogue. She has been featured in French Vogue as a top model and appeared in editorials for French, German, British, American, Australian, Italian, and Russian Vogue, i-D, Harper's Bazaar, French and Japanese Numéro, W and V magazines.

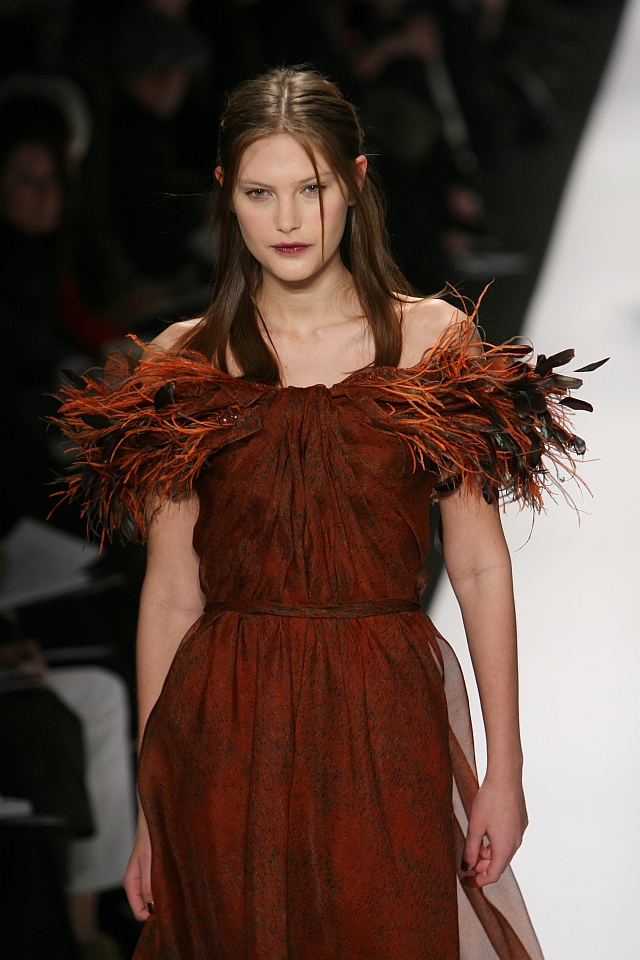
McNeil in a Carolina Herrera Show

At the peak of her career, she was ranked 12th on the Top 50 Models Women list by models.com. She was chosen to be in the Pirelli Calendar 2010, and was photographed by Terry Richardson in Bahia, Brazil. After taking a break from modeling, from 2009 to 2012, her big return was the Fall/Winter season in 2013. That year, she opened 7 shows and became the first face of FashionTV. The next years were successful as well: she appeared in Kenneth Cole, Donna Karan, Prada, Dolce & Gabbana, Jimmy Choo, and Blumarine. She also appeared in advertising campaigns by Dior eyewear and Giorgio Armani, and appeared on the covers of Turkish, Russian, Mexican and Australian Vogue as well as Numero, i-D, W, Dazed & Confused, Pop, Rika, Interview, Antidote, and Muse. Models.com declared Mcneil as an "industry icon" in 2014.

== Personal life ==
McNeil is bisexual. In late 2009, she was photographed kissing Australian model and actress Ruby Rose during a pool party in Los Angeles. The pair were reportedly engaged, but the engagement was called off on 2 July 2010. She subsequently started dating British male model Miles Langford, and the couple became engaged in 2013. However, the pair later called off the engagement. In January 2023, McNeil married American basketball player Miles Plumlee in New York City, wearing what was described as a midriff-baring dress by Mônot.

=== Tattoos ===
McNeil has a plethora of tattoos, the majority of which are on her back. The entirety of tattoos on her back can be seen on the cover of Elle Russia.
