= Ali Stephens =

American model (born 1991)

- Born: May 10, 1991 (age 35); Salt Lake City, Utah, USA
- Spouse: Nicholas Lund (m. 2012)
- Modeling information
- Height: 1.80 m (5 ft 11 in)
- Hair color: Light brown
- Eye color: Blue-grey
- Agency: Nomad Management (New York, Miami); Marilyn Agency (Paris); The Fabbrica (Milan); Two Management (Copenhagen, Los Angeles); Model Management (Hamburg); Stockholmsgruppen (Stockholm)

Alison F. Stephens (born May 10, 1991) is an American model.

== Early life ==
Stephens was born in Salt Lake City, Utah.

She participated in cross country running at East High School, placing second in her region in 2006.

== Personal life ==
Stephens had no prior experience or interest in the modeling industry. Stephens became friends with fellow model Toni Garrn during bookings with Calvin Klein in fall 2008.

Stephens married Nicholas Lund on August 3, 2012.

Stephens says she practices Transcendental Meditation and supports the programs of the David Lynch Foundation. She is interested in environmentalism and works with the non-profit group Oceana to preserve the world's oceans.

== Career ==
Stephens was discovered while shopping with her family in Salt Lake City and signed a three-year contract with Elite Model Management in August 2007 after submitting Polaroid photos of herself. On September 25, 2007, she made her runway debut at the Prada spring/summer fashion show in Milan.

During 2007, her first year as a fashion model, Stephens was an exclusive for the spring Prada runway show in Milan and opened for the spring Chloé show in Paris. During that year she also walked the runway on behalf of Chanel, Dries van Noten, Givenchy and Louis Vuitton. She was featured as a "rising star" in Hintmag.com's “Model Mania”, Pop magazine and was chosen by Style.com as a member of an elite group of emerging runway stars called “The Ten”. In December 2007, Vmagazine.com called Stephens the second-ranked model for the upcoming spring season.

In 2008 Stephens became the face of Chloé and M Missoni and was photographed by David Sims for Calvin Klein. She modeled for Gap's international spring ad campaign and was photographed for Prada Sport. She was hired as an exclusive for the fall Calvin Klein show in New York City and opened the fall Nicole Farhi and CNC Costume National shows in London and Milan. She was featured on the cover of the Korean magazine W and the cover of MUSE. French Vogue also featured Stephens as a top model that year. In April, Stephens was the focus of a Calvin Klein billboard on the corner of Houston and Lafayette Street in New York City. She was named by New York Look magazine as "This Year's Girl" and signed a cosmetics contract with Chanel. In the fall of 2008, Stephens opened for the spring show of Peter Som in New York City and closed the spring Jonathan Saunders, Preen, and Sophia Kokosalaki shows in New York City and Paris.

In 2009 Stephens appeared in many fashion magazines including Vogue China, Italian Vogue, Japanese Vogue, i-D, Numero, Allure, and the cover of Russh and the French magazine, Revue de Modes. She was also chosen that year as the model for Lacoste’s fall ad campaign.

In 2010 Stephens appeared in German Vogue and Teen Vogue and was featured on the cover of the French version of Elle.

Stephens has walked the runway for many designers including Shiatzy Chen, Balenciaga, Dries van Noten, Givenchy, Chanel, Kenzo, Nina Ricci, Miu Miu, and Louis Vuitton.

She has appeared in ads for Prada, Gap, Chloé, Alexander Mcqueen, Diane Von Furstenberg, Bergdorf Goodman, Missoni, Karen Millen, Lacoste, Chanel mascara, Georges Rech, Uniqlo, Neiman Marcus, Calvin Klein, and appeared in editorials for Numéro, The New York Times, Harper's Bazaar, Allure, V Magazine, Flair, British, Quebec, and French Elle, and American, French, Japanese, Italian, Chinese, Teen, German, and British Vogue.

In a 2010 New York magazine article, Stephens said "I'm not one of the girls willing to starve themselves for fashion, so I do what shows I can but I don’t pressure myself to fit into the sample sizes." For this reason Stephens now participates in a smaller number of fashion shows per season.
