= Daria Strokous =

Russian model

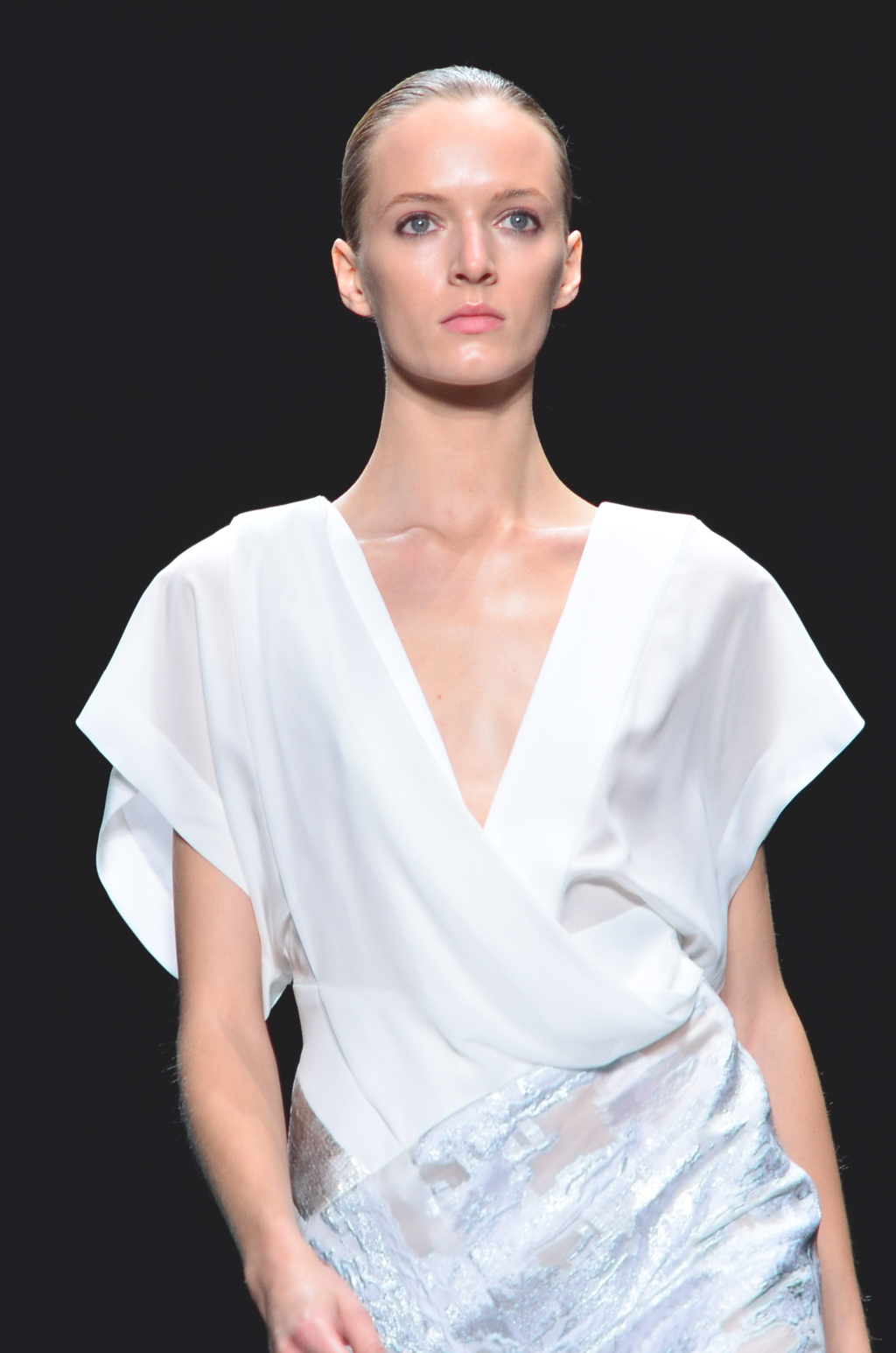
- Born: Daria Vladimirovna Strokous; 25 September 1989 (age 37); Moscow, Soviet Union
- Years active: 2007–present
- Modeling information
- Height: 1.8 m (5 ft 11 in)
- Hair color: Blonde
- Eye color: Blue
- Agency: Heroes Model Management (New York); Oui Management (Paris); Monster Management (Milan)

Daria Vladimirovna Strokous (Russian: Дарья Владимировна Строкоус; born 25 September 1989) is a Russian fashion model, film actress, and photographer.

== Early life ==
Strokous was born in Moscow, Russia (then still part of the Soviet Union) to Vladimir and Olga Strokous. Soon after she was born, her family moved to Benin where she lived and studied until the age of five.

== Modeling career ==
In September 2007 she debuted in Fashion Weeks in Milan and Paris. Her debut was an exclusive for the Prada show in Milan. V magazine included her in their Top 10 Models of 2008. The magazine New York named her as one of Top 10 Models to watch, as well as Today's Top Model in Milan.

Strokous has also been featured in Style.com for many top designers and Models.com in featured articles.

She played a small role in the 2011 film Contagion. She also appeared as the lead model in the short film for Dior " Secret Garden – Versailles" by Inez van Lamsweerde and Vinoodh Matadin.

In 2014, Strokous was included in the New Generation of "Industry Icons" list by Models.com.

== Education ==
Strokous graduated from the University of Southern California's School of Cinematic Arts in 2021.

== Filmography ==
=== Film ===
Year	Title	Role	Notes
2011	Contagion	Irina	Film debut
