= Karmen Pedaru =

Estonian model (born 1990)

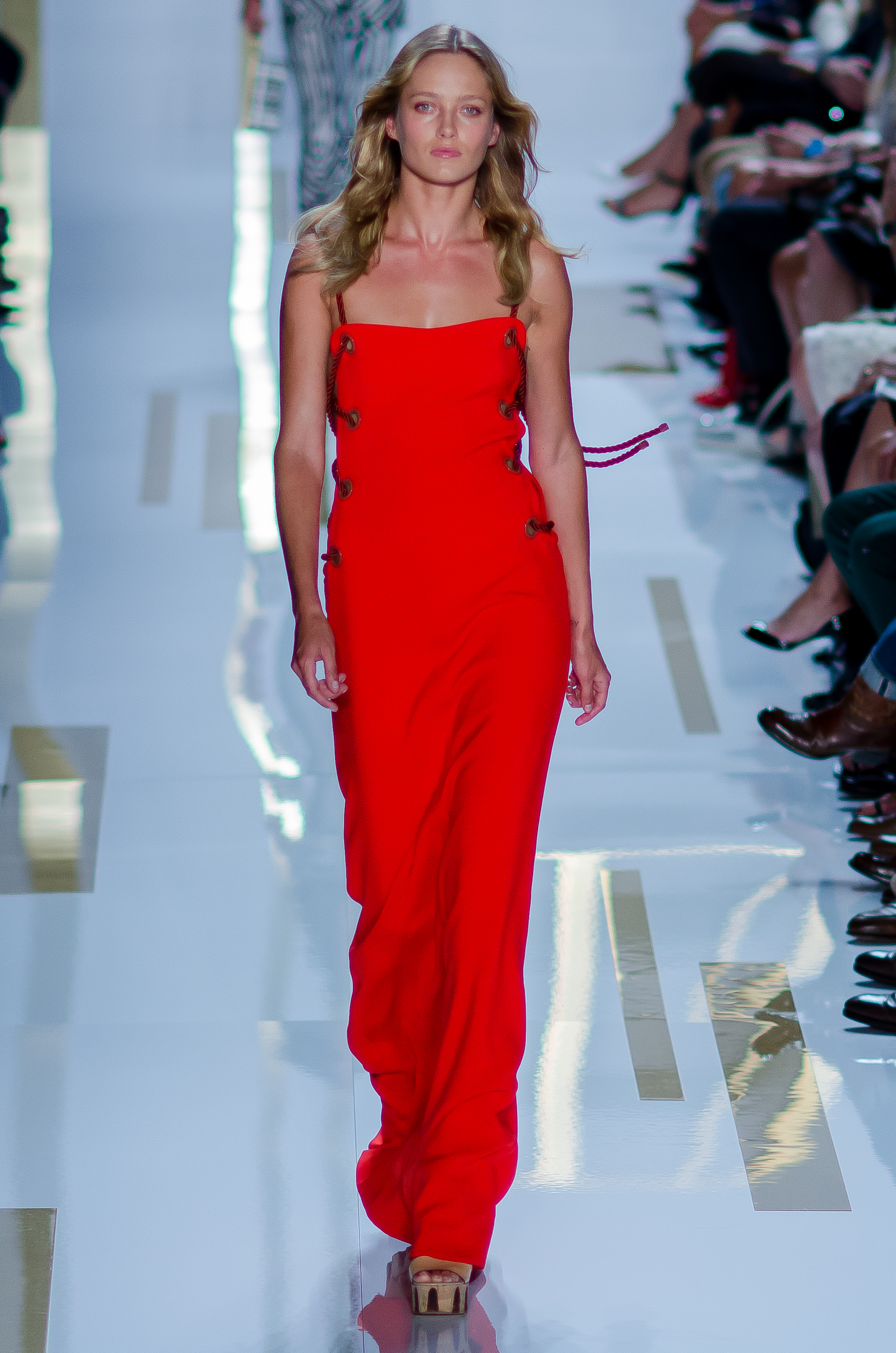
- Pedaru in 2013
- Born: 10 May 1990 (age 35); Kehra, Estonia
- Modeling information
- Height: 1.78 m (5 ft 10 in)
- Hair color: Light brown
- Eye color: Green
- Agency: Next Model Management (New York, Paris, Milan, London); View Management (Barcelona); 2pm Model Management (Copenhagen); Model Management (Hamburg); Public Image Management (Montreal); MIKAs (Stockholm)

Karmen Pedaru (born 10 May 1990) is an Estonian model. She is best known for her long-time work with Michael Kors.

== Personal life ==
Pedaru was born in Kehra, Estonia. She was raised by her grandmother after her mother died when Pedaru was five years old. Born into an athletic family, Pedaru became interested in sports at a very early age. From the age of six, she played a variety of sports, including basketball, association football, and handball. She played goalkeeper on Estonia's national U-19 football team for a year before she quit to pursue modeling.

== Career ==
Pedaru was discovered in 2005, at the age of 15, at Draamateater theater in Tallinn. Shortly after, she signed with Next Models and appeared in an editorial for Teen Vogue. Her runway debut came the next year when she walked for Christopher Kane during the spring 2007 season. Her big opportunity came when she walked the fall 2008 shows during New York Fashion Week; she ended up walking 43 runways, making appearances in shows such as Marc Jacobs, Donna Karan, Givenchy and Dries Van Noten.

Since then, Pedaru has appeared in advertisements for Chloe, Gucci, Jill Stuart, Missoni, Nicole Farhi, Ralph Lauren, and Derek Lam. In 2011, she replaced fellow Estonian model Carmen Kass as the new face of Michael Kors, who called her look "sporty, sexy chic," and in 2012, she appeared in a campaign for Belstaff alongside actor Ewan McGregor. Pedaru has walked for numerous designers in New York, London, Milan and Paris, including Shiatzy Chen, Alexander McQueen, Chanel, Christian Dior, D&G, Diane von Furstenberg, Louis Vuitton, Roberto Cavalli, Versace, and Yves Saint Laurent, and in 2011, she made her debut at the Victoria's Secret Fashion Show, where she had two outfits, one of which had wings. She has appeared in editorials for Numéro, Harper's Bazaar, Elle, V Magazine, W Magazine, Dazed & Confused and the Italian, French, British, Korean, German, Portuguese, and Japanese editions of Vogue.

As of March 2014, Pedaru was ranked #4 in the "Top 50 Models" list compiled by Models.com. She is currently ranked as an Industry Icon and Money Girl.
