= Hilary Rhoda =

American model (born 1987)

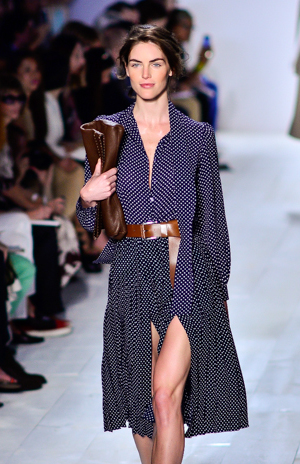
- Rhoda in 2013
- Born: Hilary Rhoda Hollis; April 6, 1987 (age 39); Chevy Chase, Maryland, United States
- Occupation: Model
- Spouse: Sean Avery (m. 2015)
- Children: 1
- Modeling information
- Height: 1.80 m (5 ft 11 in)
- Hair color: Dark brown
- Eye color: Blue
- Agency: IMG Models (New York, Paris, Milan, London)

Hilary Rhoda Hollis (born April 6, 1987) is an American model. She is perhaps best known for her work with the brand Estée Lauder and her 2009, 2010 and 2011 appearances in the Sports Illustrated Swimsuit Issue.

== Early life ==
Rhoda was born in Chevy Chase, Maryland, and raised there and in Rye, New York. She has Irish ancestry. As a high-school student at the Academy of the Holy Cross in Maryland she was on the field hockey and basketball teams as a three-year varsity athlete, and as a member of the Washington Catholic Athletic Conference championship team she earned honors and was awarded best offensive player. Recruited by several colleges to play field hockey, Rhoda deferred her college acceptances after she began a career in modeling during her sophomore year.

== Career ==
Rhoda was discovered at a ProScout event in Washington, D.C. She soon appeared in ads for Hollister and Abercrombie, before switching to Click Model Management and then to IMG Models, globally. She is currently represented by IMG Models in New York.

She was featured in the 2011 Max Mara AW campaign. She previously appeared in advertisements for Balenciaga, Valentino, Belstaff, Dolce & Gabbana, Givenchy, Donna Karan, Gucci, Gap, DSquared², Shiatzy Chen, Blumarine, and Ralph Lauren, and in Victoria's Secret catalogs. She has also appeared on the covers of American Vogue, Vogue Italia, Vogue Paris, British Harper's Bazaar, Time, Numéro, and W. In particular, for the May 2007 issue of American Vogue, Rhoda was featured on the cover with fellow models Doutzen Kroes, Caroline Trentini, Raquel Zimmermann, Sasha Pivovarova, Agyness Deyn, Coco Rocha, Jessica Stam, Chanel Iman, and Lily Donaldson as the "World’s Next Top Models."

In January 2007, Rhoda signed an exclusive contract with Estée Lauder as their newest face. In July that year, earning at an estimated total of $2 million in the prior 12 months, Forbes named her 12th in their list of The World's 15 Top-Earning Supermodels. She was the face of Via Spiga, St. John Knits (replacing Angelina Jolie), ERES Beachwear, and the Neiman Marcus spring/summer 2009 campaigns. 2009 also marked Rhoda's debut in Sports Illustrated Swimsuit Edition.

Rhoda was selected to model the Hope Diamond in the Embrace Hope necklace on November 18, 2010, for the 50th anniversary on display at the Smithsonian. She also appeared in Victoria's Secret's Fashion Show 2012.

Rhoda ranked sixth in Forbes' 2013 ranking of the world's highest-paid models.

== Personal life ==
Rhoda dated former New York Jets quarterback Mark Sanchez for several years, including appearing with him in a GQ photo shoot.

Rhoda announced on November 13, 2013, that she was engaged to former National Hockey League player Sean Avery. They were married at the Parrish Art Museum in New York on October 10, 2015. She announced she was expecting their first child in 2020. They separated and Rhoda filed for divorce in 2022. The couple reconciled in 2024.
