= Numéro =

International fashion magazine

- Editor-in-chief: Elisabeth Djian
- Categories: Fashion magazine
- Frequency: Monthly
- Publisher: Paul-Emmanuel Reiffers
- Total circulation: 80,000 (2008)
- Founded: 1998
- Country: France
- Website: numero.com
- ISSN: 1292-6213

Numéro is an international fashion magazine published by Paul-Emmanuel Reiffers. It has a circulation of 80,000, and the French edition reached its 100th issue in February 2009. The magazine covers international fashion, beauty, design, health, architecture and decor, as well as spreads on trendsetting celebrities.

== History ==
Numéro was founded in 1998 by Elisabeth Djian, the previous fashion director of the obscure Jill magazine, who is now Numéro's editor-in-chief. Djian developed the magazine as a result of her disappointment of magazines that did not cater to her interests or women like her. When asked why she created Numéro, Djian commented, "I was bored with magazines that told me how to seduce a man. I wanted to create this magazine for an intelligent, smart woman who wants to read about art, design, music: not about stupidity – creams that take away wrinkles, you know, which is stupid." Since the magazine launched, Djian has also created a menswear title of the magazine called Numéro Homme, and one for contemporary art called Numéro Art.

== International editions ==
=== Editors ===
Country	Circulation dates	Editor-in-chief	Start year	End year
Japan (Numéro Tokyo)	2007–present	Ako Tanaka (田中 杏子)		
South Korea (Numéro Korea)	2008–2010			
China (Numéro China)	2010–present	Karchun Leung	2013	
China (Numéro China)	2010–present	Tang Shuang	2026	present
Thailand (Numéro Thailand)	2010–present	Jah Boonyasit		
Russia (Numéro Russia)	2013–2022	André Leon Talley	2013	2014
Russia (Numéro Russia)	2013–2022	Alena Isaeva	2014	
Russia (Numéro Russia)	2013–2022	Maria Nevskaya	2015	2017
Germany (Numéro Berlin)	2016–present	Götz Offergeld	2016	present
The Netherlands (Numéro Netherlands)	2019–present	Timotej Letonja	2019	present
Brazil (Numéro Brasil)	2023–present	Giovanni Frasson	2023	present
Switzerland (Numéro Switzerland)	2024–present	Sebastian Magunacelaya	2024	present
United States (Numéro New York)	2025–present	Philip Utz	2025	present
Turkey (Numéro Istanbul)	2026–present	Gülen Yelmen	2026	present

=== Numéro Tokyo ===
Launched in April 2007, Numéro Tokyo featured Kate Moss on their debut cover. Other well-known models that have graced past covers include Chloë Sevigny, Abbey Lee Kershaw, Agyness Deyn, Coco Rocha, Devon Aoki, Gisele Bundchen, Stella Tennant, Alexa Chung, and Victoria Beckham. Musicians Lana Del Rey and Sky Ferreira have appeared on the March 2013 and July/August 2013 covers respectively.

=== Numéro Korea ===
Launched in July 2008 and closed in 2010. Cover subjects included Maryna Linchuk, Doutzen Kroes and Snejana Onopka.

=== Numéro China ===
In September 2010, the Numéro China magazine was launched as the third international edition for the market in China.

=== Numéro Thailand ===
Following Numéro China's publication, Numéro Thailand was released in December 2012, the first issue featuring Thai models "Aokbab" and Khunying Mangmoom on the cover photographed by Thananon Thanakornkarn. The magazine reports on art, fashion, design, and culture.

=== Numéro Russia ===
In March 2013, Numéro Russia released their first issue featuring Naomi Campbell on the cover, styled by Ethan Park and photographed by Sebastian Kim. Former Vogue contributor, Andre Leon Talley, also made his debut as Numéro Russia's editor-at-large. In an interview for Women's Wear Daily, he says that he "... took the job because I love Russia and the salary was something fabulous ... Anna was very sympathetic and understood and she decided we remain on good terms and that I do the digital and the online. And I'm very happy to do it."

=== Numéro Netherlands ===
First issue was published in September 2019. The magazine switched from Dutch to English in 2020.

== Numéro Homme ==
Numéro Homme premiered in 2007 and is Numéro magazine's separate biannual international publication for men, with Philip Utz as the current editor-at-large. The magazine's content centers on various aspects of the contemporary man's lifestyle, which includes fashion, beauty, travel, business and cars.

Photographers Sebastian Kim, Karl Lagerfeld, Jacob Sutton, Greg Kadel, and Jean Baptiste Mondino have frequently produced work for the publication. The magazine has featured several top male models, including Fernando Cabral, Yuri Pleskun, Arthur Gosse, Florian Van Bael, and Victor Nylander. Jude Law modeled for Numéro Homme's Fall/Winter 2008 cover. Numéro Homme is now issued in Germany, Netherland and France with some bi-annual in Japan. Numéro Homme International is set to be première in 2020, with a New international team (including Arnaud Henry Salas-Perez as editor at large) under the same directorial bureau.

== Criticism ==
The October 2010 issue of Numéro magazine was criticized for containing a spread shot by Greg Kadel featuring editorial model Constance Jablonski in blackface and wearing an afro.

In March 2013, the magazine came under fire for another blackface incident, this time involving model Ondria Hardin in a spread shot by Sebastian Kim and entitled "African Queen". When The Huffington Post contacted Numéro about the scandal, they responded via email with an apology and a disclaimer, stating that Kim's work "... is in line with his previous photographic creations, which insist on the melting pot and the mix of cultures, the exact opposite of any skin color based discrimination". The photographer emailed The Huffington Post sometime after Numéro did, explaining that his aesthetic vision "... was based on 60's characters of Talitha Getty, Verushka and Marissa Berenson with middle eastern and Moroccan fashion inspiration" and that he did not intend for Hardin to appear black nor for the spread's title to be "African Queen".

== See also ==
- List of Numéro magazine cover models
- List of Numéro China cover models
- List of Numéro Russia cover models
- List of Numéro Tokyo cover models
- List of Numéro Korea cover models
