= Korea's Next Top Model season 1 =

Korea's Next Top Model
- Season 1
- Season 1 cast
- Presented by: Jang Yoon-ju
- Judges: Jang Yoon-ju; Lee Hye-ju; Logan Kang; Park Hyung-jun; Woo Jong-wan
- No. of episodes: 13

Release
- Original network: OnStyle
- Original release: September 18 – December 11, 2010

Season chronology
- Next → Season 2

The first season of Korea's Next Top Model (or Do-jeon Supermodel Korea) aired from September to December 2010 on OnStyle. On 6 January 2010[2] it was announced that Korean channel Onstyle would begin production of a Korean version of the model search show. Jang Yoon-Ju helmed the judging panel as the host of the show. The international destination was Paris.

This season featured fourteen contestants in its final cast. The prizes for this season included: A cash prize of 100,000,000 South Korean won, a cover shoot and editorial in W Magazine Korea, a contract with SK-II and a modelling contract with ESteem Entertainment.

The winner was 21-year-old Lee Ji-min, who beat fellow finalists Kim Na Rae and Lee Yoo Kyung who both ended up in runner-up position respectively.

== Cast ==
=== Contestants ===
(Ages stated are at start of contest and use the Korean system of determining age)

Contestant	Age	Height	Outcome	Place
Kim Yu-ri	17	1.66 m (5 ft 5 1/2 in)	Episode 3	14
Lee Eun-young	24	1.79 m (5 ft 10 1/2 in)	Episode 4	13
Shin Young-eun	24	1.76 m (5 ft 9 1/2 in)	Episode 5	12
Seok Dan-bi	22	1.72 m (5 ft 7 1/2 in)	Episode 5	11
Kim Ye-ji	22	1.75 m (5 ft 9 in)	Episode 6	10
Seon Hye-lim	18	1.69 m (5 ft 6 1/2 in)	Episode 7	9
Kim Hyo-kyeong	19	1.77 m (5 ft 9 1/2 in)	Episode 8	8–7
Baek Il-hong	23	1.71 m (5 ft 7 1/2 in)	Episode 8	8–7
Kim Min-sun	20	1.71 m (5 ft 7 1/2 in)	Episode 9	6
Oh Hye-ji	23	1.77 m (5 ft 9 1/2 in)	Episode 10	5
Park Doo-hee	28	1.72 m (5 ft 7 1/2 in)	Episode 11	4
Lee Yoo-kyung	24	1.81 m (5 ft 11 1/2 in)	Episode 13	3–2
Kim Na-rae	18	1.72 m (5 ft 7 1/2 in)	Episode 13	3–2
Lee Ji-min	21	1.76 m (5 ft 9 1/2 in)	Episode 13	1

=== Judges ===
- Jang Yoon-ju
- Lee Hye-ju
- Logan Kang
- Woo Jong-wan

=== Other cast members ===
- Park Hyung-jun

== Episodes ==
No. overall	No. in season	Title	Original release date
1	1	"Episode 1"	TBA
Special guests: Featured photographer:
2	2	"Episode 2"	TBA
Special guests: Featured photographer:
3	3	"Episode 3"	TBA
Special guests: Featured photographer:
4	4	"Episode 4"	TBA
Special guests: Featured photographer:
5	5	"Episode 5"	TBA
Special guests: Featured photographer:
6	6	"Episode 6"	TBA
Special guests: Featured photographer:
7	7	"Episode 7"	TBA
Special guests: Featured photographer:
8	8	"Episode 8"	TBA
Special guests: Featured photographer:
9	9	"Episode 9"	TBA
Special guests: Featured photographer:
10	10	"Episode 10"	TBA
Special guests: Featured photographer:
11	11	"Episode 11"	TBA
Special guests: Featured photographer:
12	12	"Episode 12"	TBA
Special guests: Featured photographer:
13	13	"Episode 13"	TBA
Special guests: Featured photographer:

== Results ==
Order	Episodes										
Order	2 (Note: Episode 1 was a casting episode. In episode 2, the pool of 24 girls were reduced to the final 13 who would move on to the main competition. This first call-out does not reflect their performance. Hye-ji was added to the competition in a last-minute decision, making 14 girls who made it in the competition.)	3	4	5 (Note: In episode 5, Dan-bi, Il-hong, and Young-eun landed in the bottom three. Young-eun was the first to be eliminated. The episode ended with a cliffhanger with Dan-bi and Il-hong awaiting the final decision. The elimination was shown at the beginning of the following episode.)	6	7	8 (Note: Episode 8 featured a double elimination with the bottom three contestants being in danger of elimination.)	9	10	11	13
1	Yoo-kyung	Na-rae	Na-rae	Yoo-kyung	Hye-ji	Hye-ji	Min-sun	Ji-min	Yoo-kyung	Na-rae	Ji-min
2	Na-rae	Doo-hee	Min-sun	Hye-lim	Ji-min	Yoo-kyung	Hye-ji	Yoo-kyung	Ji-min	Ji-min	Na-rae; Yoo-kyung
3	Hye-lim	Yoo-kyung	Hye-ji	Hyo-kyeong	Hye-lim	Na-rae	Yoo-kyung	Hye-ji	Doo-hee	Yoo-kyung	Na-rae; Yoo-kyung
4	Min-sun	Min-sun	Yoo-kyung	Ye-ji	Na-rae	Il-hong	Doo-hee	Na-rae	Na-rae	Doo-hee	
5	Eun-young	Dan-bi	Doo-hee	Na-rae	Il-hong	Doo-hee	Na-rae	Doo-hee	Hye-ji		
6	Young-eun	Ji-min	Ji-min	Min-sun	Yoo-kyung	Min-sun	Ji-min	Min-sun			
7	Ji-min	Il-hong	Dan-bi	Ji-min	Min-sun	Ji-min	Hyo-kyeong; Il-hong				
8	Doo-hee	Hye-ji	Hyo-kyeong	Doo-hee	Hyo-kyeong	Hyo-kyeong	Hyo-kyeong; Il-hong				
9	Il-hong	Young-eun	Young-eun	Hye-ji	Doo-hee	Hye-lim					
10	Dan-bi	Eun-young	Il-hong	Il-hong	Ye-ji						
11	Ye-ji	Ye-ji	Ye-ji	Dan-bi							
12	Hyo-kyeong	Hye-lim	Hye-lim	Young-eun							
13	Yu-ri	Hyo-kyeong	Eun-young								
14	Hye-ji	Yu-ri									

The contestant was eliminated
The contestant won the competition

== Post–Top Model careers ==
- Kim Yu-ri did not pursue modelling after the show.
- Lee Eun-young signed with YG KPlus. She took a number of test shots and was featured on JoongAng Ilbo in May 2011. She has walked in fashion shows for Jaehwan Lee Spring/Summer 2012 and Rad Hourani Spring/Summer 2012. Lee retired from modeling in 2014.
- Shin Young-eun did not pursue modelling after the show.
- Suk Dan-bi signed with YG KPlus. She has taken a couple of test shots and appeared on magazine editorials for Graphy - Hair&Beauty November 2011. She has modeled for Mosca Clothing, Cres. E Dim. FW14,... and walked in fashion shows of Cres. E Dim., Rêvasseur SS14, Singapore Designers Showcase FW14, Yohanix FW15, Noir Contemporain FW16, VVV Korea SS17,... Beside modelling, Suk is also co-founder of a clothing line called The Rumor Shop. She retired from modeling in 2017.
- Kim Ye-ji signed with YG KPlus. She has taken a couple of test shots and appeared on magazine editorials for Job & Joy October 2010, Woman Chosun August 2012, My Wedding August 2013, YouLookFly March 2014,... She has modeled for Mini Capsule Mode SS15 and walked in fashion shows of Etro, Johnson Hartig, Enzuvan FW11, S=YZ Studio SS13, Sumisumi Clothing SS16,... Kim retired from modeling in 2017.
- Sun Hye-lim did not pursue modelling after the show.
- Kim Hyo-kyung signed with YG KPlus. She has modeled for Michael Kors, Adidas, Lancôme, Sony,... and appeared on magazine editorials for Vogue October 2011, Harper's Bazaar June 2012, Marie Claire June 2012, Bling August 2012, Lady Kyunghyang November 2012,... She has walked in fashion shows of Cres. E Dim., Mag & Logan, Partsparts, Johnson Hartig, The Studio K SS12, RAD by Rad Hourani SS12, Soulpot Studio SS12, Kwak Hyun Joo SS14, Big Park FW14, Nohke FW15, Bourie FW15, Kaal E.Suktae FW15, Metrocity World FW15, Sabatier Official, Choi Jae Hoon Wedding, Heritiqueny NewYork, Katiacho Cruise 2018, Grace U FW23,... Kim is also the winning model of Project Runway Korea 2012.
- Baek Il-hong mainly pursuing a career as an influencer. She has taken a couple of test shots and walked in fashion show for Cres. E Dim. SS15. She has modeled for Cres. E Dim. Pre-Spring 2014, Jubilee Bride, Dark Victory, Rock Revival, Jeep Renegade, Marmot SS17,... Baek retired from modeling in 2020.
- Kim Min-sun signed with Morph Model Management. She has taken a couple of test shots and appeared on magazine editorials for 1st Look November 2015. She has modeled and shooting campaign for Nike, New Balance, Adidas, AllSaints, Magnifico N Magnificent Summer 2011, L'Oréal FW16, Seoul Motor Show 2017, Slim9 Korea, MWMW Cashmere, Regnum Jewelry, Downy, Samsung, Shinsegae,... and walked in fashion shows of Imsenoc SS12, Low Classic SS13, Mosca Clothing FW13, Holy Number 7 SS19, Jin Barbie,... Beside modeling, Kim is also work as a Body part model, which she has appeared in several campaigns such as SK-II China, Paulvice Jewelry, Renault Samsung,...
- Oh Hye-ji signed with YG KPlus, W Agency Inc. and Primo Model Management in Hong Kong. She has taken a couple of test shots and modeled for Mini Capsule Mode SS15, Seoul Motor Show 2017,... She has appeared on magazine editorials for Lady Kyunghyang July 2012, Women's Donga December 2013, BNT News December 2017,... and walked in fashion shows of Enzuvan, Jaison Couture, SJYP FW10, The Studio K FW11, Moon Young Hee FW13, Metrocity World FW15, Sabatier Official,...
- Park Doo-hee signed with I Models. She has taken a couple of test shots and modeled for SPRC by Superinc. She has appeared on magazine cover and editorials for Beauty Life, Graphy - Hair&Beauty November 2011, Health 365 July 2019, Beauty N Fashion February 2019,... Beside modeling, Park is also competed on Ocean Bikini Contest 2017, Nica Korea First Championship 2018, Ms Hollywood Tribute 2019,...
- Kim Na-rae signed with ESteem Entertainment. She has appeared on magazine cover and editorials for W, Elle, Marie Claire, Vogue Girl, Vogue, Esquire, Le Debut, Singles, Beauty+, Elle Girl June 2011, Wannagirls December 2011, Allure January 2014, Nylon March 2014, F.Ound May 2014, InStyle November 2014, Arena Homme + January 2015, My Wedding January 2016, Nylon Japan January 2017,... She has modeled for American Apparel, Magnifico N Magnificent SS11, Banila B, J Koo FW12, Mah Soyoung, Mixop Showroom, The Gobo, SJSJ, Yes Underwear, Oui Paname, Andew Fall 2018, Uniqlo, ABC-Mart,... and walked in fashion shows of J Koo, Miss Gee Collection, Low Classic, Wonder Anatomie, The Studio K, Tibaeg, Steve J & Yoni P FW11, Marc Jacobs FW11.12, Ally Alice FW13, Paul&Alice FW13, Guess FW13, Lucky Chouette SS14, Byungmun Seo FW15, Rocket x Lunch SS16, VVV Korea SS17,... Beside modeling, Kim is also own of a clothing line called Narli Summer and appeared in the music video "Baby Good Night" by GD & TOP.
- Lee Yoo-kyung signed with DCM Model Management. She has taken a couple of test shots and modeled for Klesia Beauty Salon, Moree Bracelet, Benetton Group FW12,... She retired from modeling in 2014.
- Lee Ji-min has collected her prizes and signed with ESteem Entertainment. She is also signed with Model One in Hong Kong and has modeled for SK-II, The Vartist, R.Shemiste, Styl.myl., Incoco, Miss Gee Collection FW20,... She has appeared on magazine cover and editorials for W, My Wedding, Singles, Nylon January 2011, Luxury August 2011, Elle January 2012, Elle Girl January 2012, Harper's Bazaar June 2013, Allure August 2013, Marie Claire September 2013, Marie Claire Hong Kong, Zip Hong Kong September 2014, Ming's Hong Kong September 2014, Elle Accessories Hong Kong FW14, Lucy's US #23 August 2016,... and walked in fashion shows of Jinteok, J Koo, Fendi FW11.12, Marc Jacobs FW11.12, Demoo Parkchoonmoo SS12, Cres. E Dim. SS13, Jarret Seoul FW13, Suuwu FW13, Tibaeg FW13, TheKam FW14, Leyii FW14, R.Shemiste FW14, S=YZ Studio FW14, Jayho SS15, Kumann Yoo Hye Jin FW15,... Lee retired from modeling in 2020.
