= Hyun Ji Shin =

South Korean fashion model

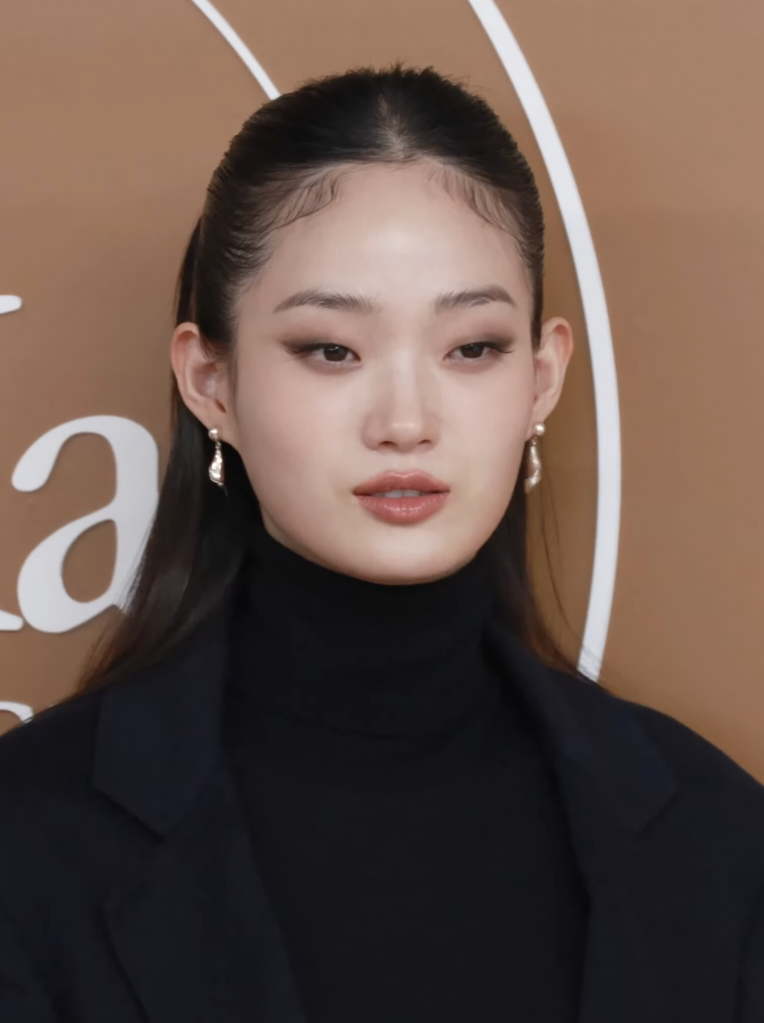
- Shin in October 2024
- Born: 15 March 1996 (age 30); Seoul, South Korea
- Spouse: Unnamed (m. 2026)
- Modeling information
- Height: 1.75 m (5 ft 9 in)
- Hair color: Brown
- Eye color: Brown
- Agency: IMG Models (worldwide); Gost Agency (Seoul)

Korean name
- Hangul: 신현지
- RR: Sin Hyeonji
- MR: Sin Hyŏnji
- IPA: [ɕʰin çʌn.dʑi]

Shin Hyun-ji (Korean: 신현지; born 15 March 1996) is a South Korean fashion model. After winning Korea's Next Top Model, Shin appeared on the cover of international Vogue editions. She currently ranks on models.com's "Industry Icons" list.

== Career ==
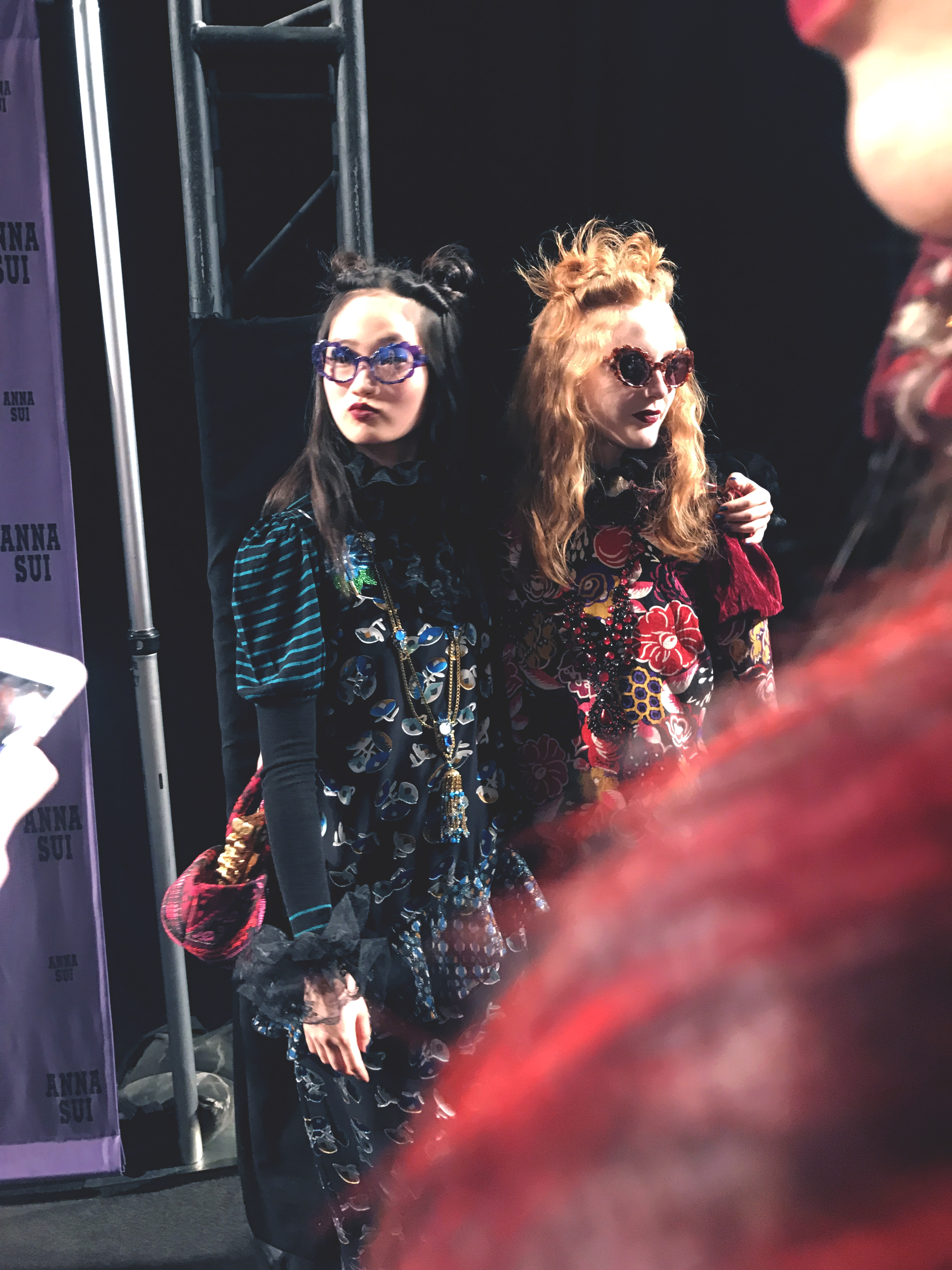
Shin (left) with Madison Stubbington backstage at Anna Sui's Fall/Winter 2017 show

Shin's mother enrolled her in a modeling academy and she began her career on Korea's Next Top Model; had she not become a model she would've considered a career as an architect.

After winning the fourth season of Korea's Next Top Model, besting fellow model HoYeon Jung, she signed with IMG Models. Internationally, Shin began her career in Sydney, before walking for Coach at New York City's Hudson Yards building. She appeared in 30 fashion shows during her first season, such as Chanel, Prada, Jacquemus, Burberry, Dries van Noten, Miu Miu, Jil Sander, Isabel Marant, DKNY, 3.1 Philip Lim, Rodarte, and Marc Jacobs. Shin was selected as a "Top Newcomer" by Models.com for the Spring Summer 2016 season.

Shin was photographed by Karl Lagerfeld shortly before his death, for what would ultimately become his final Chanel campaign. She also appeared in Chanel's Fall Winter 2019 fashion show, which was a tribute to Lagerfeld. Her other career highlights with Chanel include closing the Fall Winter 2020 show alongside American model Gigi Hadid and Danish model Mona Tougaard. In 2020, she walked more than 20 different shows for designers including Salvatore Ferragamo, Tory Burch, Louis Vuitton, and Yves Saint Laurent.

Shin has appeared on the cover of CR Fashion Book, and Asian editions of W and Vogue among others. She has also been featured in Zara's summer advertisement.

Shin ranked on models.com's "Top 50" list, and was nominated as a "Breakout Star" for their 2018 Model of the Year Awards. Shin says her ultimate goal is to model for decades and she would like to have the longevity of models like Kate Moss, Lauren Hutton, and Cindy Crawford.

In July 2023, Shin closed the Chanel Haute Couture Fall 2023 Show. The second Asian model to do this after Devon Aoki.

== Personal life ==
In April 2026, Shin married a non-celebrity in a private ceremony with Jang Yoon-ju, Hong Jin-kyung, Dex, and Bang Min-ah attending her wedding.
