= Jang Yoon-ju =

South Korean model

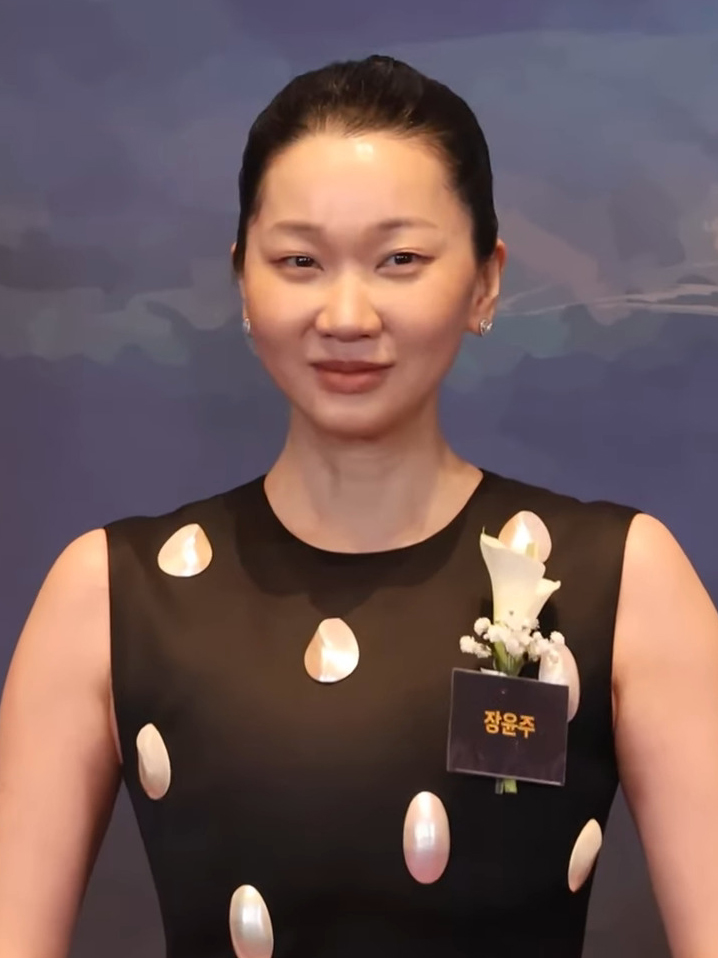
- Jang in 2026
- Born: November 7, 1980 (age 45); Seoul, South Korea
- Education: Seoul Institute of the Arts
- Occupations: Model; television personality; singer-songwriter; actress
- Years active: 1997–present
- Agents: ESteem Entertainment (Model); Billions (Acting)
- Height: 1.71 m (5 ft 7 1/2 in)
- Spouse: Jung Seung-min (m. 2015)
- Children: 1

Korean name
- Hangul: 장윤주
- RR: Jang Yunju
- MR: Chang Yunju
- Website: jangyoonju.com

Jang Yoon-ju (Korean: 장윤주; born November 7, 1980) is a South Korean model, television personality, singer-songwriter and actress. Yoon-ju began modeling in 1997 when she was 17 years old, and became one of the most successful Korean fashion models, with a career spanning almost two decades. She also hosts Korea's Next Top Model, and won Best Radio DJ at the 2013 KBS Entertainment Awards for KBS Cool FM's Rooftop Radio. As a singer-songwriter, Jang has released two albums, Dream (2008) and I'm Fine (2012). She made her acting debut in 2015, playing a detective in Ryoo Seung-wan's crime thriller Veteran.

Jang is currently represented by ESteem Entertainment (SM Entertainment) as a model and by XYZ Studio as an actress.

== Career ==
In May 2011, Jang along with fellow models Kim Jae-wook, Ji Hyun-jung, Han Hye-jin and Song Kyung-ah, co-authored a book titled Top Model. It is based on their experiences in the industry and includes beauty, makeup and styling tips.

== Filmography ==
=== Film ===
Year	Title	Role	Ref.
2015	Veteran	Miss Bong	
2021	Three Sisters	Miok	
2024	Citizen of a Kind	Sook-ja	
2024	I, the Executioner	Detective Bong	
2024	One Win	Bang Soo-ji	

=== Television series ===
Year	Title	Role	Ref.
2024	Queen of Tears	Baek Mi-seon	
2025	Ms. Incognito	Ga Seon-yeong	

=== Web series ===
Year	Title	Role	Notes	Ref.
2022	Money Heist: Korea – Joint Economic Area	Nairobi	Part 1–2	
2022	Bargain	Shotgun girl	Special appearance	

=== Television shows ===
Year	Title	Role	Notes	Ref.
2006	I Am a Model 1	Host and judge		
2008	Jang Yoon-ju's 29			
2009	Music Travel Lalala			
2010	Korea's Next Top Model, Cycle 1	Host and judge		
2010	Infinite Challenge	Host, mentor, judge and actress	"2011 Calendar Project"	
2011	Korea's Next Top Model, Cycle 2	Host and judge		
2012	Jang Yoon-ju's Magic Recipe			
2012	Korea's Next Top Model, Cycle 3	Host and judge		
2013	Springtime with Yoon-ju			
2013	Korea's Next Top Model, Cycle 4	Host and judge		
2014	Korea's Next Top Model: Guys & Girls	Host and judge		
2015	SBS Special: Jang Yoon-ju's Story of the Heart			
2015	The Lovebirds 2	Main cast		
2018	Pajama Friends	Host		
2018–2019	Weekend Playlist			
2018–present	Get It Beauty	Host		
2020	Running Girls	voice assistant		
2022	Baby Singer	Teacher		
2022	Saturday Night Live Korea	Host	Episode 5 – Season 3	

=== Music video appearances ===
Year	Song title	Artist	Ref.
2001	"Good Person"	Toy	
2013	"Bad Girls"	Lee Hyori	
2020	"Black Mamba"	Aespa	

=== Radio ===
- Today Morning (MBC FM4U, 2011)
- Rooftop Radio (KBS Cool FM, 2012)

== Discography ==
- Dream (2008)
- I'm Fine (2012)
- Lisa (2017)
- Umbrella (2023) (with Lee Chan-hyuk)
- Sunlight Everywhere (2023)(with Jang Pil-soon and Jinbo)

== Bibliography ==
- CmKm (2005)
- Style Book (2006)
- Top Model (2011)

== Accolades ==
=== Awards and nominations ===
Name of the award ceremony, year presented, category, nominee of the award, and the result of the nomination
Award ceremony	Year	Category	Nominee / Work	Result	Ref.
Asian Film Awards	2021	Best Supporting Actress	Three Sisters	Nominated	
Baeksang Arts Awards	2021	Best New Actress – Film	Three Sisters	Nominated	
Blue Dragon Film Awards	2021	Best Supporting Actress	Three Sisters	Nominated	
Chunsa Film Art Awards	2021	Best New Actress	Three Sisters	Nominated	
Golden Cinematography Awards	2021	Jury's Special Award	Three Sisters	Won	
Grand Bell Awards	2015	Best Supporting Actress	Veteran	Nominated	
Grand Bell Awards	2015	Best New Actress	Veteran	Nominated	
Korea First Brand Awards	2026	Actress – Scene Stealer	Jang Yoon-ju	Won	

=== Listicles ===
Name of publisher, year listed, name of listicle, and placement
Publisher	Year	Listicle	Placement	Ref.
Korean Film Council	2021	Korean Actors 200 (Note: Introduces 200 actors that best represent the present and future of Korean cinema to the people in the film industry all over the world)	Included	
