= Korea's Next Top Model =

South Korean reality television series

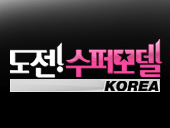
- Created by: Tyra Banks
- Judges: Jang Yoon-ju; Lee Hye-ju; Han Sang-hyuk
- Opening theme: "Saturday Love" - Cherrelle (2); "Timebomb" - Kylie Minogue (3); "Surface" - Aero Chord (5)
- Country of origin: South Korea
- No. of episodes: 65

Production
- Running time: 60 minutes

Original release
- Network: OnStyle
- Release: 18 September 2010 – 1 November 2014

Korea's Next Top Model (abbreviated as KNTM; also known as Do-jeon! Supermodel Korea (Korean: 도전! 수퍼모델 코리아; lit. 'Challenge! Supermodel Korea') is a South Korean reality television show in which a number of women compete for the title of Korea's Next Top Model and a chance to start their career in the modelling industry. The prize also includes a feature in W Magazine Korea and a contract for a brand.

As part of the Top Model franchise, it is based on the hit American TV show America's Next Top Model, and it shares the same format. On 6 January 2010 it was announced that Korean channel Onstyle would begin production of a Korean version of the model search show. Model Jang Yoon-ju would helm the judging panel as the host of the show.

Plans for a male-exclusive spin off began in 2014 before a 5th regular installment was aired, but the idea was put on hold. It was subsequently revealed that cycle 5 of the series would be a co-ed edition featuring male contestants.

== Premise ==
The series features a group of young contestants, who live together in a house for several months while taking part in challenges, photo shoots and meetings with members of the modeling industry. Normally, one or more poor-performing contestants are eliminated each week until the last contestant remaining is crowned "Korea's Next Top Model" and receives a modeling contract for representation and other prizes. In early cycles, the female height requirement was set at 165 centimetres (5 ft 5 in) tall, but was later raised to 168 centimetres (5 ft 6 in) or taller when male contestants were introduced to the show. The male height requirement is 178 centimetres (5 ft 10 in) or taller.

== Judges ==
Judge/Mentor	Cycles				
Judge/Mentor	1 (2010)	2 (2011)	3 (2012)	4 (2013)	5 (2014)
Hosts
Jang Yoon-ju	Main	Main	Main	Main	Main
Judging Panelists
Lee Hye-ju	Main	Main	Main	Main	Main
Woo Jong-wan	Main				
Logan Kang	Main				
Zo Sun-hi	Guest	Main	Guest	Guest	Guest
Jung Ku-ho		Main			
Han Sang-hyuk			Main		
Jung Wook-jun				Main	
Kim Won-joong					Main
Model mentor
Park Hyung-jun	Main				
Ha Sang-beg		Main			
Choi Mi-ae			Main		
Han Hye-yeon	Guest	Guest	Main	Main	Main

== Cycles ==
Cycle	Premiere date	Winner	Runner-up	Other contestants in order of elimination	Number of contestants	International destinations
1	18 September 2010	Lee Ji-min	Kim Na-rae & Lee Yoo-kyung	Kim Yu-ri, Lee Eun-young, Shin Young-eun & Suk Dan-bi, Kim Ye-ji, Sun Hye-lim, Baek Il-hong & Kim Hyo-kyung, Kim Min-sun, Oh Hye-ji, Park Doo-hee	14	Paris
2	9 July 2011	Jin Jung-sun	Park Seul-gi	Yoon Yoo-jin, Lee Eun-sook, Ko Jung-sun, Park So-yeon & Jenny Fuglsang, Choi Ji-hye, Ko Eun-bi, Lee Sung-sil, Lee Song-i & Lee Sun-young, Um Yoo-jung, Lee Jenny & Song Hae-na	15	Saipan; New York City
3	21 July 2012	Choi So-ra	Kim Jin-kyung	Jung Han-sol & Min Hae-rin & Kwon Da-min, Lee Seul-ki, Ji So-yeon, Jang Mi-rim, Heo Kyung-hee, Yoon Eun-hwa, Choi Han-bit, Hong Ji-su, Choi Se-hee, Kang Cho-won, Lee Min-jung, Ko So-hyun & Lee Na-hyun, Yeo Yeon-hee	18	Siem Reap; Mui Ne
4	15 August 2013	Shin Hyun-ji	Jung Ho-yeon & Hwang Hyun-joo	Ahn Hye-jin & Ko Eun-bi & Seok Il-myung, Cho Eun-saem, Seo Young-chae & Kim Eun-hae, Ryu Ye-ri, Kim Si-won, Lim Hyun-joo, Jung Ha-eun, Park Shin-ae & Kim Hye-ah	15	Phuket; Las Vegas
5	16 August 2014	Hwang Kibbeum	Lee Cheol-woo & Han Seung-soo	Choi Ji-in, Jung So-hyun, Chung Dong-kyu, Shin Jae-hyuk, Han Jian, Kim Seung-hee, Kim Jong-hoon, Kim Yaelim & Bang Tae-eun, Choi Jung-jin, Jung Yong-soo, Kim Min-jung & Hyun Ji-eun	16	Toronto
