= Korea's Next Top Model season 4 =

Korea's Next Top Model
- Season 4

Release
- Original network: Onstyle
- Original release: August 15 – November 7, 2013

Season chronology
- ← Previous; Season 3 Next → Season 5

Korea's Next Top Model, season 4 (or Do-jeon Supermodel Korea, season 4) is the fourth season of the Korean reality television show in which a number of women compete for the title of Korea's Next Top Model and a chance to start their career in the modelling industry.

This season featured fifteen contestants among its final cast. This season marked the first time in the Top Model franchise where a previously eliminated finalist (Ko Eun-bi from season 2) was allowed to become a regular season finalist once again. It was also the first time a deaf contestant, Seo Young-chae, appeared on the show. The international destinations for the series were Phuket and Las Vegas.

The prizes for this season included: A cash prize of 100,000,000 South Korean won, a cover shoot and editorial in W Magazine Korea, a modelling contract with YGKPlus and a modelling contract with NEXT Model Management in New York.

The winner of the competition was 18-year-old Shin Hyun-ji who became one of the most successful contestants from the Top Model Franchise. Runner Up Jung Ho-yeon also achieved a successful career after the series.

== Cast ==
=== Contestants ===
(Ages stated are at start of contest and use the Korean system of determining age)

Contestant	Age	Height	Finish	Place
Ahn Hye-jin	16	1.75 m (5 ft 9 in)	Episode 2	15–14
Ko Eun-bi	19	1.70 m (5 ft 7 in)	Episode 2	15–14
Seok Il-myeong	18	1.76 m (5 ft 9 1/2 in)	Episode 2	13
Cho Eun-saem	23	1.77 m (5 ft 9 1/2 in)	Episode 4	12
Seo Young-chae	22	1.67 m (5 ft 5 1/2 in)	Episode 5	11–10
Kim Eun-hae	17	1.79 m (5 ft 10 1/2 in)	Episode 5	11–10
Ryu Ye-ri	30	1.70 m (5 ft 7 in)	Episode 7	9
Kim Si-won	17	1.75 m (5 ft 9 in)	Episode 8	8
Lim Hyun-joo	31	1.68 m (5 ft 6 in)	Episode 9	7
Jung Ha-eun	26	1.72 m (5 ft 7 1/2 in)	Episode 10	6
Park Shin-ae	25	1.73 m (5 ft 8 in)	Episode 11	5–4
Kim Hye-ah	19	1.78 m (5 ft 10 in)	Episode 11	5–4
Jung Ho-yeon	20	1.76 m (5 ft 9 1/2 in)	Episode 13	3–2
Hwang Hyun-joo	22	1.74 m (5 ft 8 1/2 in)	Episode 13	3–2
Shin Hyun-ji	18	1.75 m (5 ft 9 in)	Episode 13	1

== Episodes ==
No. overall	No. in season	Title	Original release date
41	1	"Episode 1"	TBA
Special guests: Featured photographer:
42	2	"Episode 2"	TBA
Special guests: Featured photographer:
43	3	"Episode 3"	TBA
Special guests: Featured photographer:
44	4	"Episode 4"	TBA
Special guests: Featured photographer:
45	5	"Episode 5"	TBA
Special guests: Featured photographer:
46	6	"Episode 6"	TBA
Special guests: Featured photographer:
47	7	"Episode 7"	TBA
Special guests: Featured photographer:
48	8	"Episode 8"	TBA
Special guests: Featured photographer:
49	9	"Episode 9"	TBA
Special guests: Featured photographer:
50	10	"Episode 10"	TBA
Special guests: Featured photographer:
51	11	"Episode 11"	TBA
Special guests: Featured photographer:
52	12	"Episode 12"	TBA
Special guests: Featured photographer:
53	13	"Episode 13"	TBA
Special guests: Featured photographer:

== Results ==
Order	Episodes										
Order	1	2	3	4	5	7	8	9	10	11	13
1	Hyun-joo L.	Shin-ae	Shin-ae	Ha-eun	Si-won	Shin-ae	Hyun-joo H.	Hyun-ji	Ho-yeon	Ho-yeon	Hyun-ji
2	Hye-ah	Hyun-joo L.	Hyun-ji	Hyun-joo H.	Hyun-joo L.	Hyun-joo H.	Hyun-ji	Ha-eun	Hyun-joo H.	Hyun-ji	Hyun-joo H. Ho-yeon
3	Ha-eun	Hyun-joo H.	Hyun-joo H.	Young-chae	Shin-ae	Hye-ah	Hye-ah	Hyun-joo H.	Hye-ah	Hyun-joo H.	Hyun-joo H. Ho-yeon
4	Hyun-joo H.	Hyun-ji	Hyun-joo L.	Si-won	Ha-eun	Hyun-ji	Ho-yeon	Hye-ah	Hyun-ji	Hye-ah; Shin-ae	
5	Eun-hae	Hye-ah	Ha-eun	Shin-ae	Ho-yeon	Ho-yeon	Shin-ae	Shin-ae	Shin-ae	Hye-ah; Shin-ae	
6	Ye-ri	Ha-eun	Ye-ri	Hyun-ji	Hyun-joo H.	Ha-eun	Ha-eun	Ho-yeon	Ha-eun		
7	Il-myeong	Ye-ri	Young-chae	Eun-hae	Hyun-ji	Si-won	Hyun-joo L.	Hyun-joo L.			
8	Hyun-ji	Young-chae	Eun-saem	Hyun-joo L.	Ye-ri	Hyun-joo L.	Si-won				
9	Si-won	Eun-hae	Eun-hae	Hye-ah	Hye-ah	Ye-ri					
10	Yeong-chae	Si-won	Hye-ah	Ye-ri	Eun-hae; Young-chae						
11	Shin-ae	Ho-yeon	Si-won	Eun-saem	Eun-hae; Young-chae						
12	Hye-jin	Eun-bi; Hye-jin	Ho-yeon								
13	Eun-saem	Eun-bi; Hye-jin									
14	Ho-yeon	Eun-saem									
15	Eun-bi	Il-myeong									

The contestant was eliminated
The contestant won the competition

- In episode 1, the pool of 20 semifinalists was reduced to 15.
- In episode 2 Eun-bi, Ho-yeon & Hye-jin were called in the first elimination, Eun-bi & Hye-jin were Eliminated. Then Eun-saem & Il-myeong were called in the bottom two, where Il-myeong was eliminated
- Episodes 5 and 11 featured double eliminations with the bottom three contestants being in danger of elimination.
- In episode 5, the previously eliminated contestants participated in the challenge. For having performed the best, Ho-yeon was allowed to return to the competition.
- Episode 6 was a recap episode.
- Episode 12 was a reunion episode.
