= Jung Ho-yeon =

South Korean model and actress (born 1994)

- Jung in 2026
- Born: June 23, 1994 (age 32); Seoul, South Korea
- Education: Dongduk Women's University
- Occupations: Model; actress
- Years active: 2010–present
- Agents: BH Entertainment; Creative Artists Agency
- Modeling information
- Height: 5 ft 9 in (1.76 m)
- Hair color: Black
- Eye color: Brown
- Agency: The Society Management (New York); Elite Model Management (worldwide); Nomad Management (Miami, New York, Los Angeles)

Korean name
- Hangul: 정호연
- RR: Jeong Hoyeon
- MR: Chŏng Hoyŏn

Jung Ho-yeon (Korean: 정호연; born June 23, 1994) is a South Korean fashion model and actress. She began her career as a freelance model in 2010, walking in Seoul Fashion Week shows for two years. In 2013, she competed on the fourth season of Korea's Next Top Model and placed as a runner-up. She became known for her "fiery" red hair after making her international runway debut during New York Fashion Week. She was a Louis Vuitton exclusive in 2016 and became a global ambassador for the brand in 2021.

Jung made her acting debut in 2021, starring in the first season of the Netflix series Squid Game as Kang Sae-byeok, which brought her worldwide attention and critical acclaim as the series' breakout star. For her role in the series, she won the Actor Award for Outstanding Performance by a Female Actor in a Drama Series and earned a nomination for the Primetime Emmy Award for Outstanding Supporting Actress in a Drama Series. In 2024, she received the Minister of Culture, Sports and Tourism's Commendation state honour by the Korean Popular Culture and Arts Awards.

== Early life ==
Jung Ho-yeon was born on June 23, 1994, in Myeonmok-dong, Seoul, South Korea, and has two sisters. Her parents are restaurateurs. She graduated from Dongduk Women's University College of Performing Arts, where she majored in modeling.

== Career ==
=== 2010–present: Modeling career ===
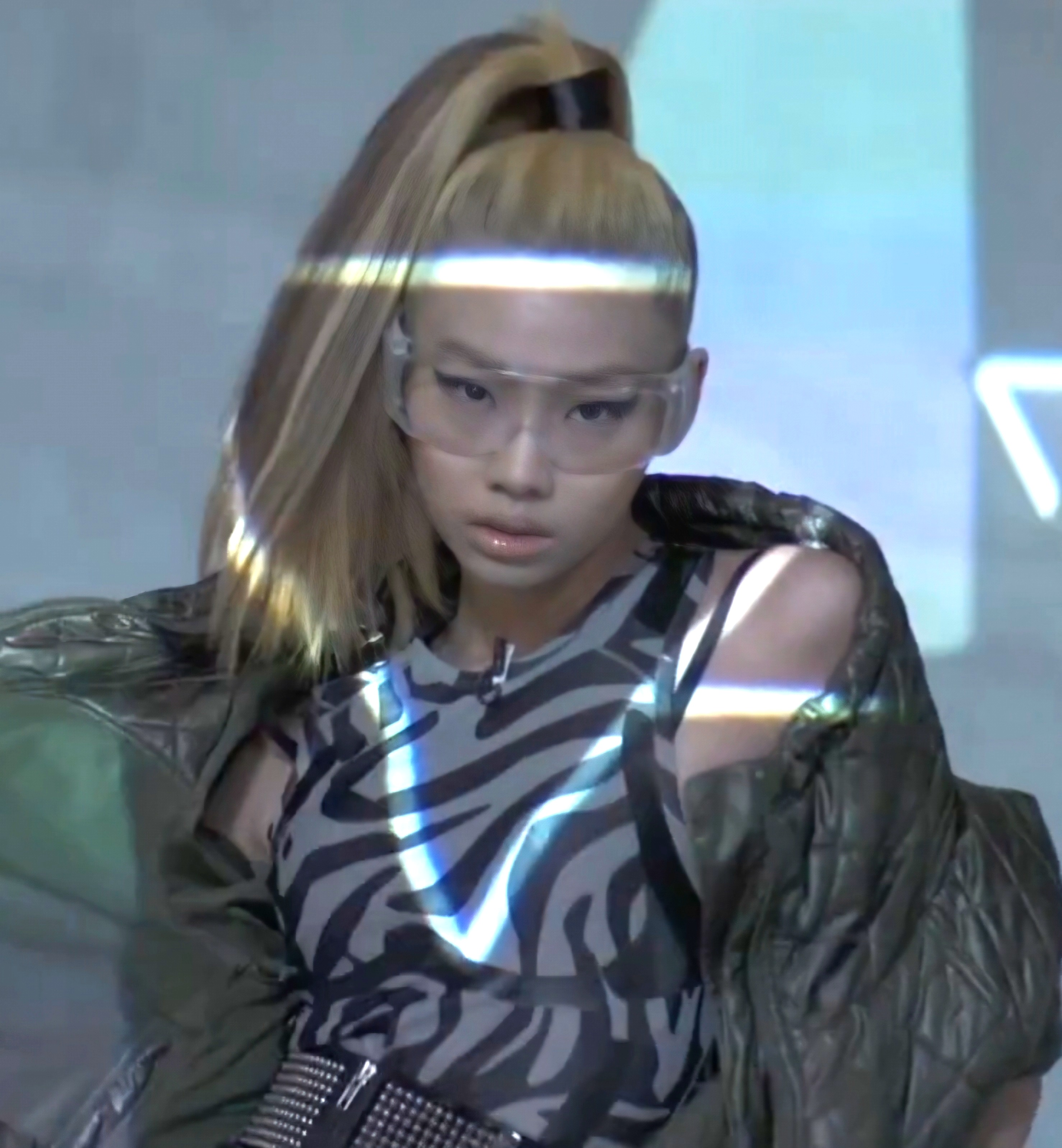
Jung in Adidas × Stella McCartney fashion film for Korea's Next Top Model season 4 in 2013

Jung started taking modeling classes at age 15, and began working as a freelance model in 2010 at age 16, (Note: Sources state that Jung began modeling in 2010, when she was 16 years old. Jung herself has said that she started modeling when she was 17 years old.) walking in shows for Seoul Fashion Week without an agency for two years. While freelancing, she auditioned for the second season of the OnStyle reality competition series Korea's Next Top Model in 2011, but quit after making it into the top 30. She signed with ESteem Models in 2012 and went on to compete on the fourth season of Korea's Next Top Model in 2013, where she placed as a runner-up. She appeared in the music video for Kim Yeon-woo's song "Move" in 2014. She was also featured in spreads for the Korean editions of magazines such as Vogue, Elle, and W before signing with The Society Management and leaving South Korea in 2016 to pursue a career overseas. She also signed to Elite Model Management and Nomad Management. Before moving to New York, Jung inadvertently dyed her hair a "fiery" red color, which became her signature look.

After her booking to walk as an exclusive for Alexander Wang was canceled, she made her international runway debut in September 2016 at Opening Ceremony's S/S 2017 show at New York Fashion Week. Shortly after, she walked in shows for Marc Jacobs, Alberta Ferretti, Chanel, Max Mara, and Fendi; appeared in Harper's Bazaar, Love, and W; and was featured in campaigns for Sephora and Gap. Also in 2016, she made her Paris Fashion Week runway debut as an exclusive model for Louis Vuitton at their S/S 2017 show, selected by Nicolas Ghesquière and casting director Ashley Brokaw. In September 2018, Models.com named Jung on their list of the top 50 models. At the 2019 Asia Model Awards, she won the Asia Star Award.

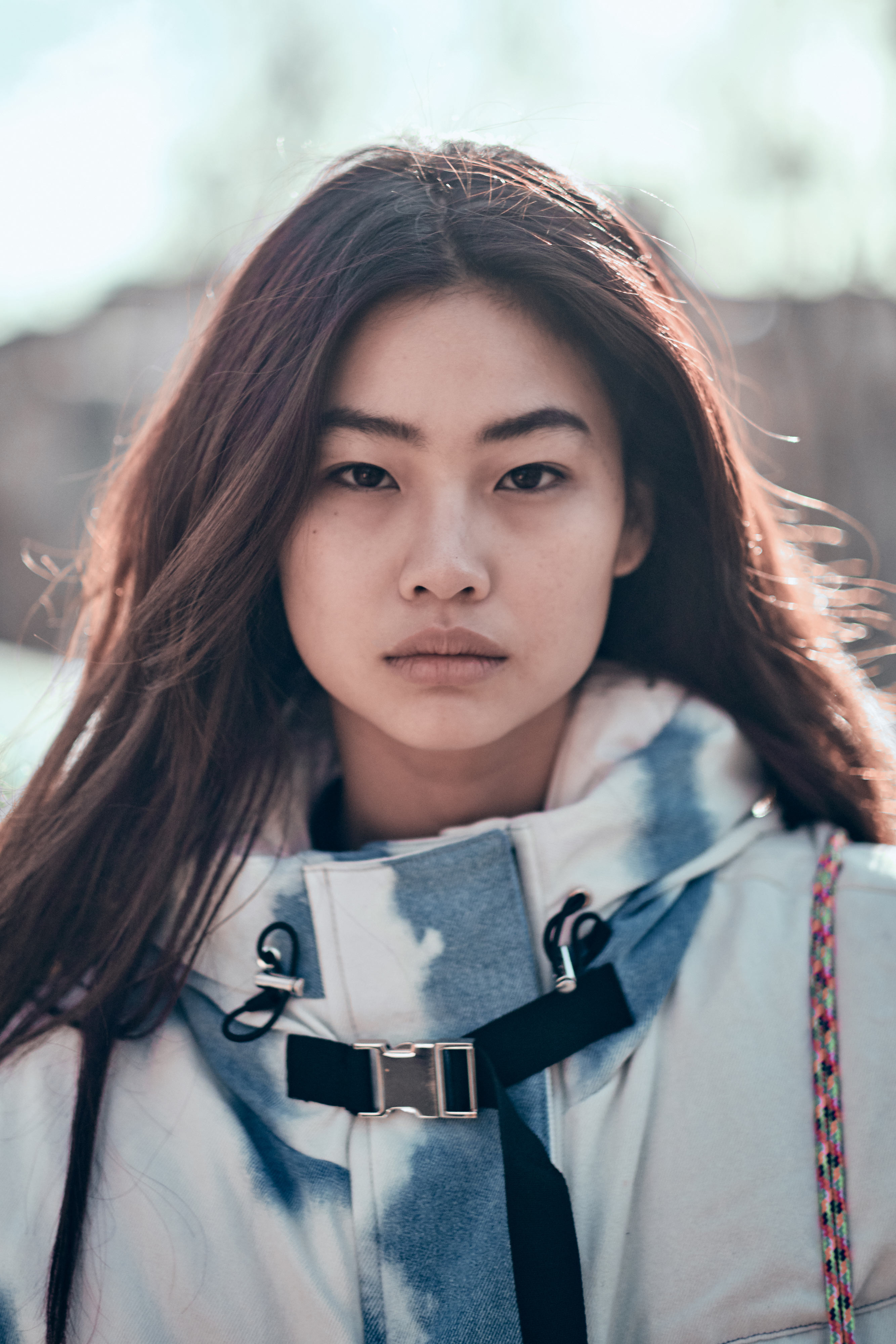
Jung at Milan Fashion Week in February 2019

Jung has walked in runways for Burberry, Miu Miu, Jason Wu, Chanel, Schiaparelli, Giambattista Valli, Bottega Veneta, Emilio Pucci, Prabal Gurung, Jacquemus, Gabriela Hearst, Moschino, Oscar de la Renta, Roberto Cavalli, Jeremy Scott, Tory Burch, Jean Paul Gaultier, Acne Studios, Brandon Maxwell, Gucci, Lanvin, and Zuhair Murad. She has also appeared in advertisements for Louis Vuitton, Chanel, Hermès, and Bottega Veneta, and on the covers of Vogue Korea, Vogue Japan, CR Fashion Book, and Harper's Bazaar Korea.

Jung appeared in a promotional video for Pharrell Williams and Chanel's collaborative capsule collection in March 2019. In October 2021, she was named Louis Vuitton's Global House Ambassador for Fashion, Watches and Jewelry. That same month, she partnered with Adidas Originals for their Adicolor campaign. She was featured on the cover of the February 2022 issue of Vogue, making her the magazine's first solo Korean cover star. In 2022, she became one of the faces of N°1 de Chanel. In 2022, Models.com listed Jung on the "New Supers" list, calling her a "supermodel for the modern era."

=== 2020–present: Acting career ===
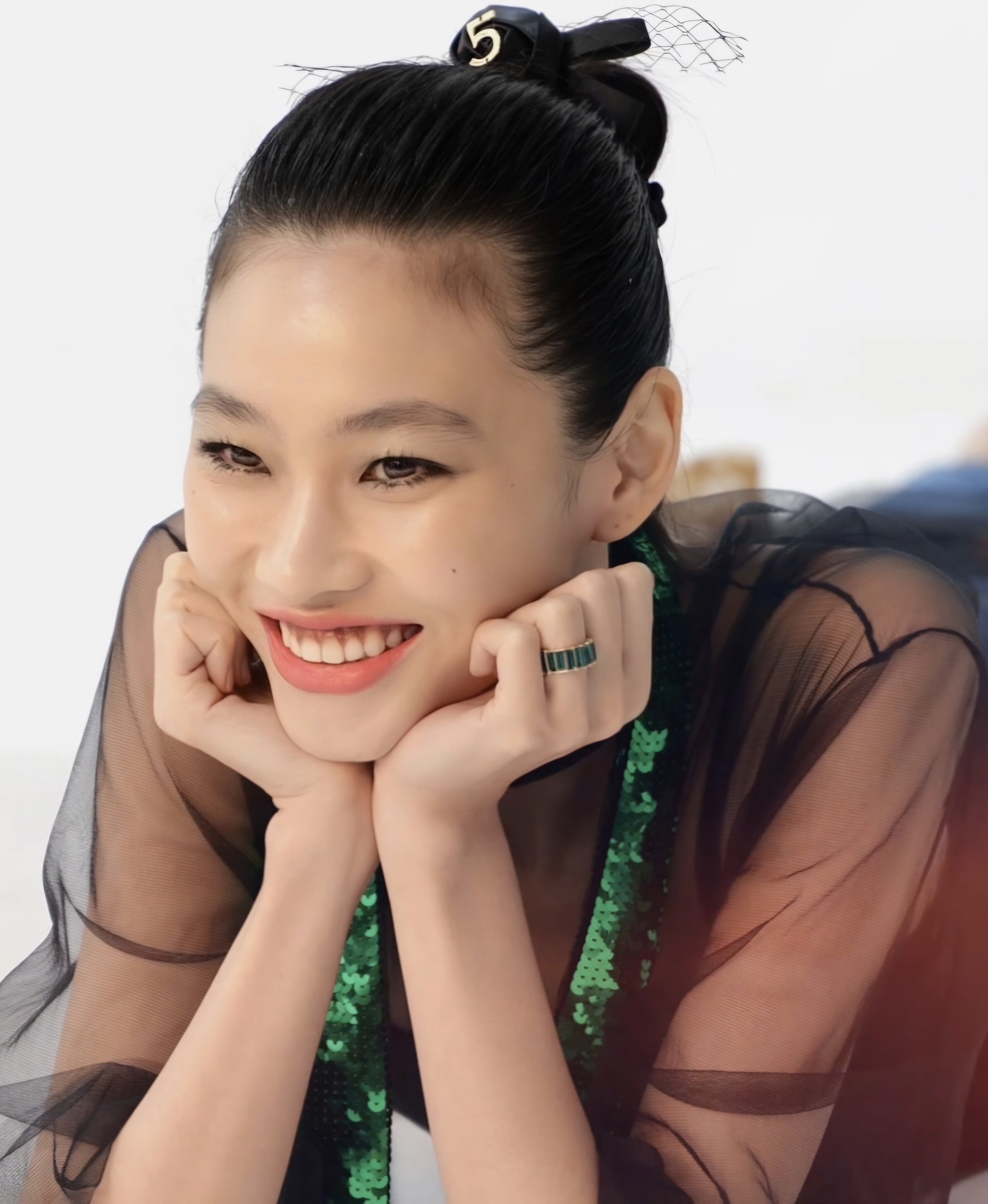
Jung for Marie Claire Korea in October 2021

Jung decided to start her career in acting because of the short lifespan of modeling careers, which she felt as her work in modeling began to decrease. While modeling overseas, Jung periodically returned to South Korea during holidays to take acting lessons, accumulating three months' worth of lessons altogether. She also improved her English in order to aid her acting studies.

In January 2020, Jung was signed to Korean talent agency Saram Entertainment. She made her acting debut in the first season of the 2021 Netflix series Squid Game in which she played Kang Sae-byeok, a North Korean defector and pickpocket who needs money to support her younger brother and track down her mother in North Korea. One month after signing with Saram, she was given three scenes from the show's script, and auditioned for the role via video while in New York for Fashion Week. She was then asked by director Hwang Dong-hyuk to audition again in person in South Korea, where she was given the part immediately. She studied for the role of Sae-byeok by practicing her character's Hamgyŏng dialect with real North Korean defectors, watching documentaries about North Korean defectors, and learning martial arts. She also drew upon her own feelings of loneliness while modeling overseas to build the character, and wrote a daily diary from her character's perspective.

Sae-byeok became a fan favorite, and Jung was hailed by critics as Squid Game's breakout star. For her performance on the show, Jung won the Screen Actors Guild Award for Outstanding Performance by a Female Actor in a Drama Series at the 28th Screen Actors Guild Awards. This nomination made her the second actress of Asian as well as Korean descent to receive an individual SAG Award nomination. Her win, along with costar Lee Jung-jae winning the respective male award, made history for the show becoming the first non-English language television series to win at the SAG Awards. She was also nominated along with her costars for the Screen Actors Guild Award for Outstanding Performance by an Ensemble in a Drama Series.

In November 2021, she signed a contract with Creative Artists Agency, an American talent agency. Jung appeared in the music video for The Weeknd's song "Out of Time" in 2022 as well as two of NewJeans' music videos released the following year.

In 2024, she made her first cameo in the comedy mystery series Chicken Nugget as Hong Cha, a renowned food blogger. The same year, she appeared in Alfonso Cuarón's thriller miniseries Disclaimer. Jung made her feature film debut in Na Hong-jin's film Hope.

In January 2025, Jung signed with Korean talent agency BH Entertainment.

== Public image ==
While working as a model, Jung became known by designers as the "red-haired Asian". Vogue's Monica Kim called her "one of Seoul's top modeling talents" in 2015. In 2021, K-Ci Williams of Vulture called Jung "the world's current 'It' girl." Jung became the most-followed South Korean actress on Instagram in 2021, surpassing actresses Lee Sung-kyung and Song Hye-kyo and, as of November 2023, has over 20 million followers on the platform.

== Personal life ==
Jung began dating actor Lee Dong-hwi in 2015. On November 26, 2024, both Lee and Jung's agencies released a joint statement saying that the two have separated after nine years of dating.

== Filmography ==
=== Film ===
Key
†	Denotes films that have not yet been released

Film appearances
Year	Title	Role	Notes	Ref.
2026	Hope	Im Sung-ae		
2027	The Hole †		Post-production	

=== Television ===
Television appearances
Year	Title	Role	Notes	Ref.
2011	Korea's Next Top Model	Herself	Season 2 semi-finalist	
2013	Korea's Next Top Model	Herself	Season 4 contestant and runner-up	
2021–2025	Squid Game	Kang Sae-byeok	Main role (season 1); cameo (seasons 2–3)	
2024	Chicken Nugget	Hong Cha	Cameo; 3 episodes	
2024	Disclaimer	Jisoo	Miniseries; 3 episodes	

=== Music video appearances ===
Music video appearances
Year	Song title	Artist	Ref.
2014	"Beat"	100%	
2014	"Move"	Kim Yeon-woo	
2022	"Out of Time"	The Weeknd	
2023	"Cool with You (side A)"	NewJeans	
2023	"Cool with You (side B)"	NewJeans	

== Accolades ==
=== Awards and nominations ===
Name of the award ceremony, year presented, category, nominee of the award, and the result of the nomination
Award ceremony	Year	Category	Nominee(s)/Work(s)	Result	Ref.
APAN Star Awards	2022	Best New Actress	Squid Game	Nominated	
APAN Star Awards	2022	Popularity Star Award, Actress	Squid Game	Nominated	
Asia Artist Awards	2021	U+Idol Live Popularity Award – Actress	Jung Ho-yeon	Won	
Baeksang Arts Awards	2022	Best New Actress – Television	Squid Game	Nominated	
Blue Dragon Film Awards	2026	Best New Actress	Hope	Pending	
Blue Dragon Series Awards	2022	Best New Actress	Squid Game	Won	
Buil Film Awards	2026	Best New Actress	Hope	Won	
Critics' Choice Super Awards	2022	Best Actress in an Action Series	Squid Game	Won	
Director's Cut Awards	2022	Best Actress in series	Squid Game	Won	
Director's Cut Awards	2022	Best New Actress in series	Squid Game	Nominated	
Korea First Brand Awards	2021	Rookie Actress	Jung Ho-yeon	Won	
MTV Movie & TV Awards	2022	Best Breakthrough Performance	Squid Game	Nominated	
National Film Awards UK	2022	Best Supporting Actress in a TV Series	Squid Game	Nominated	
Primetime Emmy Awards	2022	Outstanding Supporting Actress in a Drama Series	Squid Game	Nominated	
Screen Actors Guild Awards	2022	Outstanding Performance by a Female Actor in a Drama Series	Squid Game	Won	
Screen Actors Guild Awards	2022	Outstanding Performance by an Ensemble in a Drama Series (Note: with Lee Jung-jae, Park Hae-soo, Wi Ha-joon, Anupam Tripathi, Heo Sung-tae, O Yeong-su, and Kim Joo-ryoung)	Squid Game	Nominated	

=== State honors ===
Name of the organization, year presented, and the award given
Country	Ceremony	Year	Award	Ref.
South Korea	Korean Popular Culture and Arts Awards (Note: Honors are given at the Korean Popular Culture and Arts Awards, arranged by the Korea Creative Content Agency and hosted by the Ministry of Culture, Sports and Tourism. They are awarded to those who have contributed to the arts and South Korea's pop culture.)	2024	Minister of Culture, Sports and Tourism's Commendation	

=== Listicles ===
Name of publisher, year listed, name of listicle, and placement
Publisher	Year	Listicle	Placement	Ref.
Business of Fashion (Note: The BoF 500 is a professional index published by Business of Fashion of people who shape the global fashion industry.)	2022	BoF 500	Included	
Cine21	2021	New Actress to watch out for in 2022	1st	
Cine21	2021	Best New Actress of the Year in the series category	1st	
Cine21	2024	Korean Film Next 50 – Actors	Included	
Forbes	2022	Korea Power Celebrity Rising Star	Included	
Forbes	2022	30 Under 30 Asia	Included	
Gold House (Note: The A100 List honours the most impactful Asians and Asian American & Pacific Islanders (AAPIs) in culture every May for AAPI Heritage Month. Gold House "champions trailblazing members of the AAPI community and their transformative contributions to entertainment, fashion, lifestyle, technology, business, social activism and politics from the past year".)	2022	A100 List (with Squid Games Creator & Stars)	Included	
GQ	2023	GQ Global Creativity Awards	Included	
Korea Newspaper Journalists Association	2026	K-Culture 100 Great Koreans	Included	
Variety	2022	Women That Have Made an Impact in Global Entertainment	Included	
