= Weekend Playlist =

Korean television program

- Promotional poster
- Hangul: 주말 사용 설명서
- Lit.: Weekend Manual
- RR: Jumal sayong seolmyeongseo
- MR: Chumal sayong sŏlmyŏngsŏ
- Starring: Jang Yoon-ju; Kim Sook; Ra Mi-ran; Lee Se-young
- Country of origin: South Korea
- Original language: Korean
- No. of seasons: 1
- No. of episodes: 17 (list of episodes)

Production
- Producer: Kim Yoon Jun
- Production locations: South Korea; Hong Kong
- Production company: JFamily

Original release
- Network: tvN
- Release: November 30, 2018 – January 27, 2019

Weekend Playlist (Korean: 주말 사용 설명서; RR: Jumal sayong seolmyeongseo) is a South Korean variety show program on tvN starring Jang Yoon-ju, Kim Sook, Ra Mi-ran and Lee Se-young.

It was aired on tvN starting from September 30, 2018. It was broadcast by tvN on Sundays at 18:10 (KST).

== Synopsis ==
This variety program introduces popular places to go and fun things to do on weekends. This is to give the viewers who are always troubled during weekends as of where to go. This show provides some options to head to during their weekends.

== List of Episodes ==
=== Season 1 ===
Episode 1–17 (2018–2019)

| Episode# | Broadcast Date | Weekend Plan(s) | | Special Clip(s) | Guest(s) |
| Episode# | Broadcast Date | Planner | Theme | Special Clip(s) | Guest(s) |
|---|---|---|---|---|---|
| 1 | September 30, 2018 | Kim Sook | 2 Days 1 Night Busan World Tour | Poster Taking for 'Weekend Playlist' and Karaoke Session | —N/a |
| 2 | October 7, 2018 | Kim Sook | 2 Days 1 Night Busan World Tour | Mi-ran's Daily Life | —N/a |
| 3 | October 14, 2018 | Kim Sook | 2 Days 1 Night Busan World Tour | Yoon-ju's Daily Life | Jin Jung-seon, Ji Hyun-jeong, Baek Ji-won, Anna |
| 4 | October 21, 2018 | Kim Sook | Hot Places in Seoul | —N/a | —N/a |
| 5 | October 28, 2018 | Ra Mi-ran | Ganghwa Island Weekend Food Stay | Se-young's Daily Life | —N/a |
| 6 | November 4, 2018 | Ra Mi-ran | Ganghwa Island Weekend Food Stay | First Meeting of Mi-ran & Kang Daniel | Kang Daniel (Wanna One) |
| 7 | November 11, 2018 | Jang Yoon-ju | Hong Kong 24 Hour Trip | First Meeting of Mi-ran & Kang Daniel | Kang Daniel (Wanna One) |
| 8 | November 18, 2018 | Jang Yoon-ju | Hong Kong 24 Hour Trip | —N/a | —N/a |
| 9 | November 25, 2018 | Kim Sook | With the budget of 5 Thousand Won Travelling Back and Forth to Chuncheon 1 Day Tour | —N/a | —N/a |
| 10 | December 2, 2018 | Kim Sook | Weekend Variety Cross Pocheon MT Tour | —N/a | Key (Shinee), Kim Dong-hyun, Hanhae |
| 11 | December 9, 2018 | Kim Sook | Weekend Variety Cross Pocheon MT Tour | —N/a | Key (Shinee), Kim Dong-hyun, Hanhae, Boom (Note: Boom was invited as a replacement for Key, as Key was unable to make it for the dinner time due to his personal schedule.) |
| 11 | December 9, 2018 | Ra Mi-ran | Stay in Yeosu Island (Note: Kim Sook joined the cast only during Day 1's dinner time due to other schedules.) | —N/a | Key (Shinee), Kim Dong-hyun, Hanhae, Boom |
| 12 | December 16, 2018 | Ra Mi-ran | Stay in Yeosu Island | —N/a | Rowoon (SF9) |
| 13 | December 23, 2018 | Ra Mi-ran | Stay in Yeosu Island | —N/a | Rowoon (SF9), Hwang Chi-yeul |
| 14 | January 6, 2019 | Lee Se-young | All the Things that Se-young Wants to Do Must be Done (Note: Due to Yoon-ju's advertisement schedule, she did not appear on this episode and location for this episode was in Seoul.) | —N/a | Heo Kyung-hwan |
| 15 | January 13, 2019 | Lee Se-young | All the Things that Se-young Wants to Do Must be Done | —N/a | —N/a |
| 15 | January 13, 2019 | Kim Sook | The One Man Show Challenge (Note: Since the guest was Risabae, a famous Korean beauty YouTuber, therefore the theme for this trip was "One Man Show" where everyone becomes a YouTuber to create their own one man show. Though the theme runs starting from episode 15, however, only on episode 16, the members then start their own one man show concept. On episode 15's one man show mainly focuses on Risabae's daily life.) | Risabae's Daily Life | Risabae |
| 16 | January 20, 2019 | Kim Sook | The One Man Show Challenge | —N/a | Risabae |
| 17 | January 27, 2019 | Kim Sook | Jeju Island Special Trip, The Last Story of the Professional Weekend People | —N/a | —N/a |

== Ratings ==
=== Season 1 (2018–2019) ===
List of ratings (episode 1–17)
- Ratings listed below are the individual corner ratings of Weekend Playlist. (Note: Individual corner ratings do not include commercial time, which regular ratings include.)
- In the ratings below, the highest rating for the show will be in red and the lowest rating for the show will be in blue each year.

| Ep. # | Original Airdate | AGB Nielsen Ratings |
| Ep. # | Nationwide | |
|---|---|---|
| 1 | September 30, 2018 | 1.457% |
| 2 | October 7, 2018 | 1.717% |
| 3 | October 14, 2018 | 1.206% |
| 4 | October 21, 2018 | 0.910% |
| 5 | October 28, 2018 | 2.369% |
| 6 | November 4, 2018 | 1.564% |
| 7 | November 11, 2018 | 1.855% |
| 8 | November 18, 2018 | 1.198% |
| 9 | November 25, 2018 | 1.532% |
| 10 | December 2, 2018 | 0.950% |
| 11 | December 9, 2018 | 0.993% |
| 12 | December 16, 2018 | 0.909% |
| 13 | December 23, 2018 | 0.996% |
| 14 | January 6, 2019 | 1.484% |
| 15 | January 13, 2019 | 1.002% |
| 16 | January 20, 2019 | 0.949% |
| 17 | January 27, 2019 | 1.000% |
