= Korea's Next Top Model season 3 =

Korea's Next Top Model
- Season 3

Release
- Original network: Onstyle
- Original release: July 21 – October 20, 2012

Season chronology
- ← Previous; Season 2 Next → Season 4

Korea's Next Top Model, season 3 (or Do-jeon Supermodel Korea, season 3) is the third season of a Korean reality television show in which women compete for the title of Korea's Next Top Model and a chance to start their career in the modeling industry.

This season featured eighteen contestants in its final cast. The prizes for this season included: a cash prize of 100,000,000 South Korean won, a cover shoot and editorial in W Magazine Korea, a modeling contract with YGKPlus, and a modeling contract with Major Model Management in New York.

The winner of the competition was 21-year-old Choi So-ra, who continued her modeling career after the franchise.

== Cast ==
=== Contestants ===
(Ages stated are at start of contest and use the Korean system of determining age)

Contestant	Age	Height	Outcome	Place
Jung Han-sol	23	1.76 m (5 ft 9 1/2 in)	Episode 1	18–16
Min Hae-rin	17	1.75 m (5 ft 9 in)	Episode 1	18–16
Kwon Da-min	27	1.72 m (5 ft 7 1/2 in)	Episode 1	18–16
Lee Seul-ki	24	1.67 m (5 ft 5 1/2 in)	Episode 2	15
Ji So-yeon	17	1.71 m (5 ft 7 1/2 in)	Episode 3	14
Jang Mi-rim	19	1.74 m (5 ft 8 1/2 in)	Episode 4	13
Heo Kyung-hee	23	1.71 m (5 ft 7 1/2 in)	Episode 5	12
Yoon Eun-hwa	19	1.82 m (5 ft 11 1/2 in)	Episode 6	11
Choi Han-bit	26	1.80 m (5 ft 11 in)	Episode 6	10
Hong Ji-su	17	1.76 m (5 ft 9 1/2 in)	Episode 7	9
Choi Se-hee	22	1.74 m (5 ft 8 1/2 in)	Episode 8	8
Kang Cho-won	22	1.70 m (5 ft 7 in)	Episode 9	7
Lee Min-jung	19	1.78 m (5 ft 10 in)	Episode 10	6
Go So-hyun	23	1.67 m (5 ft 5 1/2 in)	Episode 11	5–4
Lee Na-hyun	24	1.74 m (5 ft 8 1/2 in)	Episode 11	5–4
Yeo Yeon-hee	21	1.67 m (5 ft 5 1/2 in)	Episode 13	3
Kim Jin-kyung	16	1.72 m (5 ft 7 1/2 in)	Episode 13	2
Choi So-ra	21	1.79 m (5 ft 10 1/2 in)	Episode 13	1

== Episodes ==
No. overall	No. in season	Title	Original release date
28	1	"Episode 1"	TBA
Special guests: Featured photographer:
29	2	"Episode 2"	TBA
Special guests: Featured photographer:
30	3	"Episode 3"	TBA
Special guests: Featured photographer:
31	4	"Episode 4"	TBA
Special guests: Featured photographer:
32	5	"Episode 5"	TBA
Special guests: Featured photographer:
33	6	"Episode 6"	TBA
Special guests: Featured photographer:
34	7	"Episode 7"	TBA
Special guests: Featured photographer:
35	8	"Episode 8"	TBA
Special guests: Featured photographer:
36	9	"Episode 9"	TBA
Special guests: Featured photographer:
37	10	"Episode 10"	TBA
Special guests: Featured photographer:
38	11	"Episode 11"	TBA
Special guests: Featured photographer:
39	12	"Episode 12"	TBA
Special guests: Featured photographer:
40	13	"Episode 13"	TBA
Special guests: Featured photographer:

== Results ==
Order	Episodes													
Order	1		2	3	4	5	6		7	8	9	10	11	13
1	Cho-won	So-ra	Cho-won	Jin-kyung	So-hyun	So-hyun	Ji-su	So-hyun	Yeon-hee	Min-jung	Na-hyun	Jin-kyung	Yeon-hee	So-ra
2	Se-hee	Yeon-hee	So-ra	Min-jung	Yeon-hee	Yeon-hee	So-ra	Yeon-hee	Cho-won	Jin-kyung	Yeon-hee	Na-hyun	Jin-kyung	Jin-kyung
3	So-hyun	Seul-ki	Mi-rim	Na-hyun	So-ra	Han-bit	Se-hee	So-ra	Na-hyun	Yeon-hee	Min-jung	So-hyun	So-ra	Yeon-hee
4	Eun-hwa	Ji-su	Eun-hwa	So-ra	Na-hyun	Cho-won	Yeon-hee	Cho-won	So-hyun	Cho-won	Jin-kyung	So-ra	Na-hyun; So-hyun	
5	Jin-kyung	Jin-kyung	Jin-kyung	Yeon-hee	Min-jung	Se-hee	Min-jung	Jin-kyung	So-ra	So-hyun	So-ra	Yeon-hee	Na-hyun; So-hyun	
6	Ji-su	Han-bit	Na-hyun	So-hyun	Cho-won	Na-hyun	So-hyun	Na-hyun	Jin-kyung	So-ra	So-hyun	Min-jung		
7	So-yeon	Cho-won	Ji-su	Han-bit	Se-hee	Jin-kyung	Na-hyun	Min-jung	Se-hee	Na-hyun	Cho-won			
8	Kyung-hee	Na-hyun	Yeon-hee	Se-hee	Han-bit	So-ra	Jin-kyung	Ji-su	Min-jung	Se-hee				
9	Min-jung	Mi-rim	Se-hee	Cho-won	Jin-kyung	Eun-hwa	Cho-won	Se-hee	Ji-su					
10	Han-sol	Min-jung	Min-jung	Mi-rim	Eun-hwa	Ji-su	Han-bit	Han-bit						
11	Da-min	Se-hee	So-hyun	Ji-su	Kyung-hee	Min-jung	Eun-hwa							
12	Han-bit	Kyung-hee	Kyung-hee	Eun-hwa	Ji-su	Kyung-hee								
13	Seul-ki	Eun-hwa	Han-bit	Kyung-hee	Mi-rim									
14	Mi-rim	So-yeon	So-yeon	So-yeon										
15	Yeon-hee	So-hyun	Seul-ki											
16	Na-hyun	Da-min; Hae-rin; Han-sol												
17	Hae-rin	Da-min; Hae-rin; Han-sol												
18	So-ra	Da-min; Hae-rin; Han-sol												

The contestant was a separate addition later added to the cast.
The contestant was eliminated.
The contestant was eliminated outside of judging panel
The contestant won the competition.

- During the casting of Episode 1, the pool of 30 is reduced to 16 contestants. The first call-out of the episode did not reflect on performance at casting. Two more models (Da-min and Hae-rin) are later added to the cast, bringing the final number to 18 contestants.
- In the second part of Episode 1, Da-min, Hae-rin, Han-sol, and So-hyun land in the bottom four. Only So-hyun remains, eliminating the other three models.
- In Episode 6, there are two separate eliminations. The first takes place outside of the judging panel, and the ranking is determined by the casting director.
- Episode 11 features a double elimination, with the last three contestants on the line.
- Episode 12 is a reunion special featuring the contestants who participated during the season. Da-min, Hae-rin, Han-sol, and Seul-ki decided not to take part in the reunion special.
