= Hope (2026 film) =

2026 film by Na Hong-jin

- Theatrical release poster
- Hangul: 호프
- RR: Hopeu
- MR: Hop'ŭ
- Directed by: Na Hong-jin
- Written by: Na Hong-jin
- Produced by: Na Hong-jin; Kim Sae-mi; Kim Sae-rom
- Starring: Hwang Jung-min; Zo In-sung; Jung Ho-yeon; Taylor Russell; Cameron Britton; Alicia Vikander; Michael Fassbender
- Cinematography: Hong Kyung-pyo
- Edited by: Kim Sun-min
- Music by: Michael Abels
- Production companies: Forged Films; Plus M Entertainment
- Distributed by: Plus M Entertainment
- Release dates: May 17, 2026 (Cannes); July 15, 2026 (South Korea); September 9, 2026 (United States)
- Running time: 160 minutes (Cannes cut); 156 minutes (Final cut)
- Country: South Korea
- Language: Korean
- Budget: $46 million
- Box office: $53.6 million

Hope (Korean: 호프) is a 2026 South Korean epic science fiction monster film written, directed, and co-produced by Na Hong-jin. Featuring an ensemble cast including Hwang Jung-min, Zo In-sung, Jung Ho-yeon, Taylor Russell, Cameron Britton, Alicia Vikander, and Michael Fassbender, the film centers on a village police chief and his rookie deputy who must defend his local community from a mysterious creature, while a local hunting party finds itself being hunted deep in the mountains.

Hope had its world premiere in the main competition of the 2026 Cannes Film Festival on May 17, 2026, where it competed for the Palme d'Or. It was released theatrically by Plus M Entertainment in South Korea on July 15. The film received generally positive reviews from critics.

== Plot ==
Ko Bum-seok is the police chief of Hope Harbor, a small village near the Korean Demilitarized Zone populated mostly by elderly residents. His second cousin, Ko Sung-ki, asks him to inspect a dead cow with gaping wounds. Sung-ki and his fellow hunters attribute it to a stray tiger, but soon find further dead cattle and the farm's owner also dead. Bum-seok returns to a Hope Harbor in distress as a large creature rampages across the village, massacring several villagers. With reinforcements tied up fighting wildfires elsewhere, he teams up with retired colonel Ahn Nak-yeon to track it down, but the pair mistakenly shoot and badly wound a local chef while searching a dilapidated building.

Continuing the search alone, Bum-seok learns from a local militia that the creature is in fact an intelligent, apparently indestructible humanoid. After it wipes out the militia, rookie officer Im Sung-ae saves Bum-seok by firing a grenade launcher at the creature, severing one of its legs. The two give chase by car, but Bum-seok hesitates to finish the creature off after seeing it crying. The creature is killed after being run over by a tanker.

A surgeon examines the body, noting that it is a digitigrade with similarities to human anatomy but also additional unknown organs. Bum-seok and Nak-yeon later encounter an eccentric hunter and would-be carpenter, Yang-bae, who claims to have killed a second creature and stored its corpse in his freezer. The body turns out to be a monster infant. Bum-seok realizes the adult creature had been searching for its offspring, and angrily blames Yang-bae for triggering the massacre. Meanwhile, while tending the wounded at a makeshift hospital, Sung-ae learns that there are more creatures out in the woods. She tracks down Bum-seok to warn him, and the two, along with Nak-yeon and Yang-bae, head out to look for Sung-ki.

Elsewhere, Sung-ki and his fellow hunters stumble upon a massive crashed spaceship in the forest and realize the creatures are aliens. Inside, they find a nursery-like chamber but are ambushed by the alien Empress J'aur and her subordinates, Ma'veyyo and Ai'dovor. Everyone present is killed except Sung-ki, who faces off against Ma'veyyo and is nearly killed. Bum-seok's group arrives in time, allowing Sung-ki to escape on a horse belonging to a heavily armed group of local union members. Ma'veyyo pursues Sung-ki along the highway as Bum-seok and Sung-ae attack from their car. Sung-ki maneuvers himself onto the car and badly wounds Ma'veyyo using a grenade launcher. Celebrating as he hangs out the window, Sung-ki is accidentally swiped off the side of the vehicle and apparently killed.

Ma'veyyo rejoins J'aur, and together they watch as an allied spaceship belonging to Emperor Daiads falls from the sky and crashes into a nearby mountain. The resulting shockwave sends the police car off the road, forcing Bum-seok, Nak-yeon, Sung-ae and Yang-bae to press on by foot as they try to evade the aliens and reach Hope Harbor in time to raise the alarm. Meanwhile, J'aur and Ma'veyyo discuss their next move, as Ma'veyyo promises to find Xinertai, the infant, offering his own heart to revive him.

A mid-credits scene reveals that Sung-ki has survived and is limping along the highway.

== Cast ==
- Hwang Jung-min as Ko Bum-seok, the police chief of Hope Harbor
- Zo In-sung as Ko Sung-ki, a headstrong local who tracks a dangerous creature
- Jung Ho-yeon as Im Sung-ae, a rookie cop under Hope's police force
- Michael Fassbender as Ma'veyyo, an alien warrior/bodyguard
- Alicia Vikander as J'aur, the aliens' Empress
- Taylor Russell as Ai'dovor, one of the creatures and J'aur's subordinate
- Cameron Britton as Va'migere, the first alien who demolished town
- Eum Moon-suk as Yang-bae, an offbeat carpenter
- Lee Sang-hee as Ahn Nak-yeon, a retired colonel
- Im Hyun-sik as Mr. Hae-sul, an elderly local

== Production ==
=== Development ===
The film is writer and director Na Hong-jin's first since The Wailing in 2016. He has denied reports that Alfonso Cuarón was involved in the project, and has described how the film developed from an idea he had in 2017 or 2018 of a single image that came to him whilst eating in a restaurant.

It is produced by Forged Films, with Plus M Entertainment handling international sales. Cinematography is by Hong Kyung-pyo who previously collaborated with Na on The Wailing. The budget for the film was reportedly higher than any previous Korean film. The production cost was reported as $46 million in initial reports, but the director stated in an interview that he saw the amount mentioned in media articles and it did not even come close.

=== Casting ===
The main cast includes Hwang Jung-min, Zo In-sung, Hoyeon, as well as Alicia Vikander and Michael Fassbender, who do not speak Korean in the film. It marks the first on-screen collaboration for real-life married couple Vikander and Fassbender since the 2016 film The Light Between Oceans. In April 2023, Taylor Russell and Cameron Britton joined the main cast. The final cast includes Eum Moon-suk, Lee Sang-hee, and Im Hyun-sik in supporting roles. Although Um Tae-goo and Lee Kyu-hyung were initially reported to be cast in May 2023, they do not appear in the final production and are absent from all official promotional materials and release credits.

=== Filming ===
Principal photography took place in 2023 in Bukpyeong-myeon. Filming locations included Namchang in Haenam County. Filming also took place in Romania in the area around the Retezat Mountains. A sequence shot with natural daylight involving a horse riding through a forest was filmed in Retezat National Park. Vikander and Russell had completed their filming block by July 2024.

== Release ==
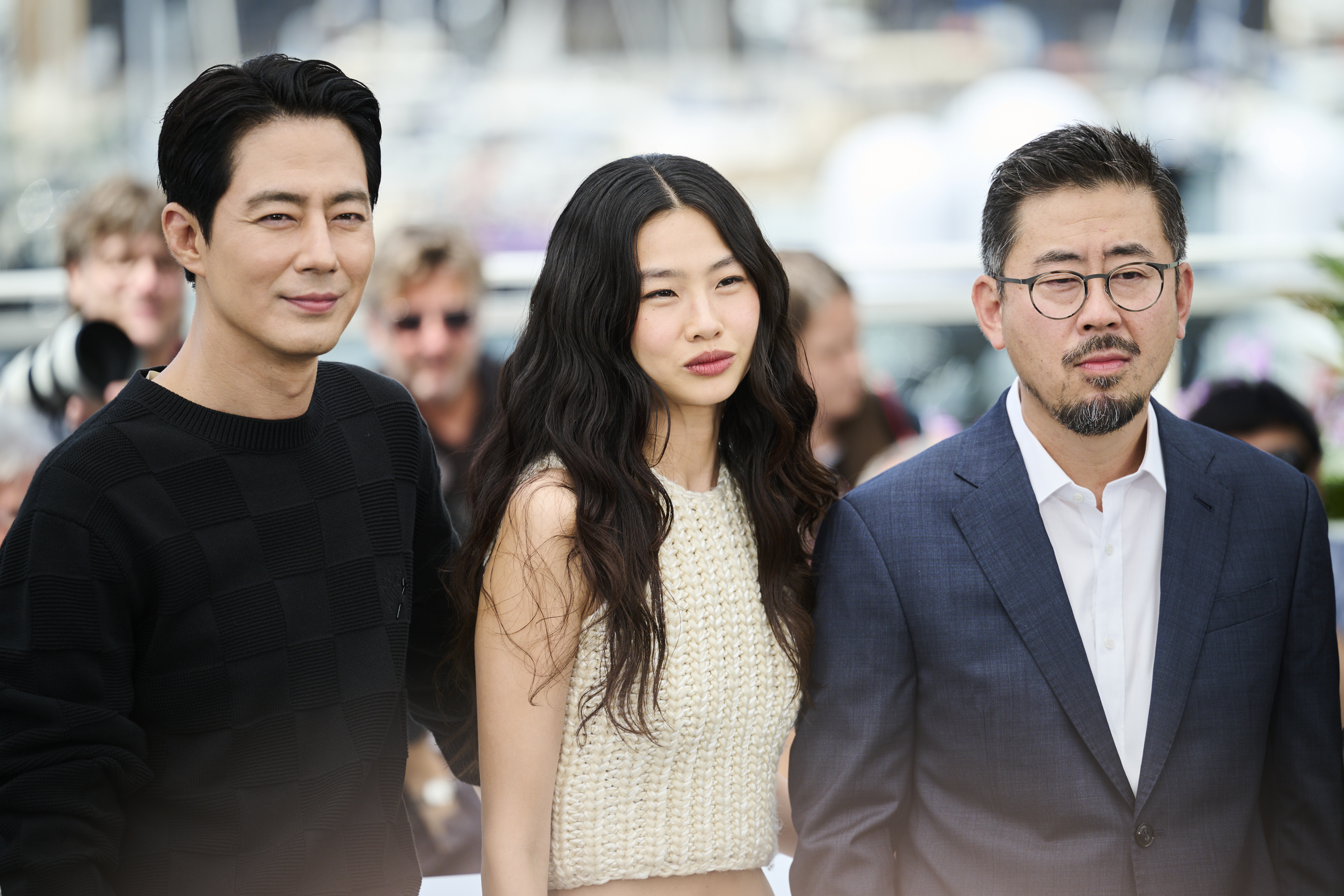
Zo In-sung, Hoyeon and Na Hong-jin at the 2026 Cannes Film Festival

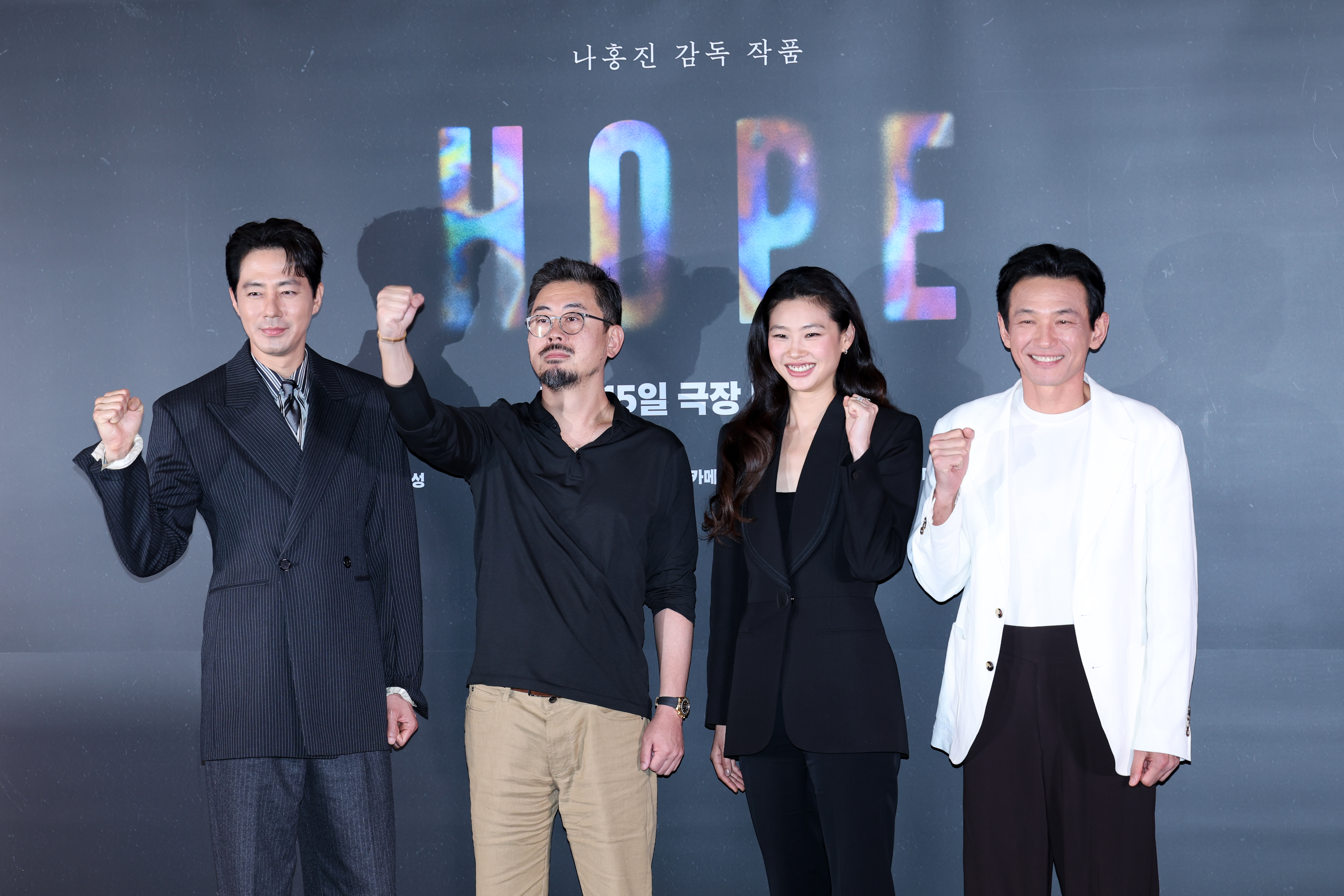
Zo In-sung, Na Hong-jin, Jung Ho-yeon, and Hwang Jung-min at the Media Screening and Press Conference.

Hope had its world premiere at the main competition of the 79th Cannes Film Festival on May 17, 2026, marking the first South Korean film to compete for the Palme d'Or since Decision to Leave (2022). The selection makes it the fourth film by director Na Hong-jin to be screened at the festival, following The Chaser (2008) in Midnight Screenings, The Yellow Sea (2011) in Un Certain Regard section, and The Wailing (2016) in the Out of Competition section.

Hope is slated for a July 15, 2026 release in South Korea. Neon scheduled its theatrical release in the United States for September 9, and also acquired distribution rights for other English-speaking territories. In May 2026, Mubi acquired distribution rights in Latin America, Germany, Austria, Switzerland, Italy, Spain and Turkey. Later that month, it was reported that Hope had pre-sold to 200 territories worldwide; among the buyers disclosed were Focus Features, which bought rights for France, the Benelux and South Africa, as well as Sony Pictures Worldwide Acquisitions, which acquired the film for Portugal, Scandinavia, Iceland, the Middle East and Israel.

The film had its North American Premiere in the Centerpiece Presentation section of the 25th New York Asian Film Festival on 20 July 2026. It had its UK Premiere at the 79th Edinburgh International Film Festival on 16 August 2026.

== Reception ==
=== Box office ===
On its opening weekend, Hope had 1.5 million admissions in South Korea, grossing $11.3 million at the box office, topping Minions & Monsters debut weekend ($2.1 million) and Moana second weekend ($1.2 million). By 2 August 2026, the film had grossed over $35 million at the local box office.

Upon its release in North America on September 9, 2026, the film grossed $1.1 million on its opening day, ranking second at the box office behind The Odyssey. It went on to gross $3.2 million in its opening weekend in North America, before falling to $1.0 million in its second weekend. In North America, it is the third-highest grossing Korean film of all time behind The King of Kings (2025) and Parasite (2019).

=== Critical response ===
On review aggregation website Rotten Tomatoes, 80% of 189 critics' reviews are positive, with an average rating of 7.1/10. The website’s consensus reads: "An unhinged sci-fi epic that boasts awe-inspiring production design and amusingly quaint visual effects, Na Hong-jin's Hope gets the adrenaline pumping whenever it focuses on the unraveling of its hapless human heroes." On Metacritic, the film has a score of 67 out of 100, based on reviews from 37 critics, indicating "generally favorable" reviews.

Nicholas Barber from BBC gave the movie four out of five stars.

Desirée de Fez of El Periódico de Catalunya gave Hope a 4-star rating, finding it to be a "fascinating" film in its blending of genres, "stunning" from a technical standpoint and observed a degree of audacity and a lack of fear of ridicule that deserves to be celebrated.

=== Accolades ===
Award	Date of ceremony	Category	Recipient(s)	Result	Ref.
Cannes Film Festival	May 23, 2026	Palme d'Or	Na Hong-jin	Nominated	
New York Asian Film Festival	July 26, 2026	Daniel A. Craft Award for Excellence in Action Cinema	Na Hong-jin	Won	
Buil Film Awards	October 7, 2026	Best Film	Hope	Nominated	
Buil Film Awards	October 7, 2026	Best Director	Na Hong-jin	Won	
Buil Film Awards	October 7, 2026	Best Actor	Zo In-sung	Nominated	
Buil Film Awards	October 7, 2026	Best New Actress	Jung Ho-yeon	Won	
Buil Film Awards	October 7, 2026	Best Supporting Actor	Eum Moon-suk	Won	
Buil Film Awards	October 7, 2026	Best Cinematography	Hong Kyung-pyo	Won	
Buil Film Awards	October 7, 2026	Art/Technical Award (Art)	Lee Hoo-kyung	Won	
Buil Film Awards	October 7, 2026	Art/Technical Award (Martial Arts)	Yoo Sang-seop	Nominated	
Buil Film Awards	October 7, 2026	Best Music	Michael Abels	Nominated	
Marie Claire Asia Star Awards	October 8, 2026	Director of the Year Award	Na Hong-jin	Won	
Marie Claire Asia Star Awards	October 8, 2026	Actor of the Year Award	Zo In-sung	Won	
Korean Association of Film Critics Awards	October 19, 2026	Top 10 Films of the Year	Hope	Won	
Korean Association of Film Critics Awards	October 19, 2026	Best Director	Na Hong-jin	Won	
Korean Association of Film Critics Awards	October 19, 2026	Best Actor	Zo In-sung	Won	
Korean Association of Film Critics Awards	October 19, 2026	Best Cinematography	Hong Kyung-pyo	Won	
Blue Dragon Film Awards	November 25, 2026	Best Film	Hope	Pending	
Blue Dragon Film Awards	November 25, 2026	Best Director	Na Hong-jin	Pending	
Blue Dragon Film Awards	November 25, 2026	Best Actor	Zo In-sung	Pending	
Blue Dragon Film Awards	November 25, 2026	Best Supporting Actor	Eum Moon-suk	Pending	
Blue Dragon Film Awards	November 25, 2026	Best New Actress	Jung Ho-yeon	Pending	
Blue Dragon Film Awards	November 25, 2026	Best Editing	Kim Sun-min	Pending	
Blue Dragon Film Awards	November 25, 2026	Best Cinematography and Lighting	Hong Kyung-pyo	Pending	
Blue Dragon Film Awards	November 25, 2026	Best Art Direction	Lee Hoo-kyoung	Pending	
Blue Dragon Film Awards	November 25, 2026	Best Music	Michael Abels	Pending	
Blue Dragon Film Awards	November 25, 2026	Technical Award (SFX)	Hong Jang-pyo	Pending	
Hollywood Music in Media Awards	November 18, 2026	Best Original Score – Sci-Fi/Fantasy Film	Michael Abels	Nominated	
