= Korea's Next Top Model season 5 =

Korea's Next Top Model
- Season 5

Release
- Original network: Onstyle
- Original release: August 16 – November 1, 2014

Season chronology
- ← Previous; Season 4

Korea's Next Top Model: Guys & Girls, is the final season of the Korean reality television show in which a number of women and men compete for the title of Korea's Next Top Model and a chance to start their career in the modelling industry. This is also the first season to feature male contestants.

This season featured sixteen contestants in its final cast. The prizes for this season included: A cash prize of 100,000,000 South Korean won, a cover shoot and editorial in W Magazine Korea, a modelling contract with ESteem Entertainment and additional benefits for the winner of the season.

The international destination for the season was Toronto, Ontario, Canada. The winner of the competition was 23-year-old Hwang Kibbeum.

== Cast ==
=== Contestants ===
(Ages stated are at start of contest and use the Korean system of determining age)

Contestant	Age	Height	Finish	Place
Choi Ji-in	26	1.77 m (5 ft 9 1/2 in)	Episode 1	16
Jung So-hyun	20	1.78 m (5 ft 10 in)	Episode 2	15
Chung Dong-kyu	19	1.84 m (6 ft 1/2 in)	Episode 3	14
Shin Jae-hyuk	21	1.89 m (6 ft 2 1/2 in)	Episode 4	13
Han Jian	23	1.78 m (5 ft 10 in)	Episode 5	12
Kim Seung-hee	16	1.71 m (5 ft 7 1/2 in)	Episode 5	11
Kim Jong-hoon	23	1.85 m (6 ft 1 in)	Episode 6	10
Kim Yaelim	19	1.69 m (5 ft 6 1/2 in)	Episode 7	9–8
Bang Tae-eun	24	1.88 m (6 ft 2 in)	Episode 7	9–8
Choi Jeong-jin	29	1.85 m (6 ft 1 in)	Episode 8	7
Jeong Yong-soo	19	1.91 m (6 ft 3 in)	Episode 9	6
Kim Min-jung	17	1.75 m (5 ft 9 in)	Episode 10	5–4
Hyeon Ji-eun	19	1.80 m (5 ft 11 in)	Episode 10	5–4
Han Seung-soo	19	1.88 m (6 ft 2 in)	Episode 12	3–2
Lee Cheol-woo	23	1.89 m (6 ft 2 1/2 in)	Episode 12	3–2
Hwang Kibbeum	23	1.75 m (5 ft 9 in)	Episode 12	1

== Episodes ==
No. overall	No. in season	Title	Original release date
54	1	"Episode 1"	TBA
Special guests: Featured photographer:
55	2	"Episode 2"	TBA
Special guests: Featured photographer:
56	3	"Episode 3"	TBA
Special guests: Featured photographer:
57	4	"Episode 4"	TBA
Special guests: Featured photographer:
58	5	"Episode 5"	TBA
Special guests: Featured photographer:
59	6	"Episode 6"	TBA
Special guests: Featured photographer:
60	7	"Episode 7"	TBA
Special guests: Featured photographer:
61	8	"Episode 8"	TBA
Special guests: Featured photographer:
62	9	"Episode 9"	TBA
Special guests: Featured photographer:
63	10	"Episode 10"	TBA
Special guests: Featured photographer:
64	11	"Episode 11"	TBA
Special guests: Featured photographer:
65	12	"Episode 12"	TBA
Special guests: Featured photographer:

== Results ==
Order	Episodes											
Order	1		2	3	4	5	6	7	8	9	10	12
1	Kibbeum	Kibbeum	Tae-eun	Seung-soo	Cheol-woo	Seung-soo; Kibbeum	Ji-eun	Seung-soo	Min-jung	Ji-eun	Cheol-woo	Kibbeum
2	Cheol-woo	Seung-soo	Seung-soo	Cheol-woo	Kibbeum	Seung-soo; Kibbeum	Kibbeum	Yong-soo	Cheol-woo	Seung-soo	Seung-soo	Cheol-woo; Seung-soo
3	Yong-soo	Min-jung	Kibbeum	Tae-eun	Tae-eun	Cheol-woo	Cheol-woo	Min-jung	Ji-eun	Min-jung	Kibbeum	Cheol-woo; Seung-soo
4	Min-jung	Jong-hoon	Cheol-woo	Ji-eun	Seung-soo	Jeong-jin	Seung-soo	Kibbeum	Seung-soo	Kibbeum	Ji-eun; Min-jung	
5	Seung-soo	Tae-eun	Jeong-jin	Jae-hyuk	Min-jung	Yong-soo	Min-jung	Ji-eun	Kibbeum	Cheol-woo	Ji-eun; Min-jung	
6	Tae-eun	Jeong-jin	Jian	Jian	Seung-hee	Ji-eun	Jeong-jin	Jeong-jin	Yong-soo	Yong-soo		
7	Ji-eun	Seung-hee	Yaelim	Yaelim	Ji-eun	Min-jung	Yong-soo	Cheol-woo	Jeong-jin			
8	So-hyun	Cheol-woo	Jae-hyuk	Jeong-jin	Yaelim	Jong-hoon	Tae-eun	Tae-eun; Yaelim				
9	Ji-in	Yong-soo	Min-jung	Kibbeum	Yong-soo	Tae-eun	Yaelim	Tae-eun; Yaelim				
10	Jeong-jin	Ji-eun	Ji-eun	Min-jung	Jong-hoon	Yaelim	Jong-hoon					
11	Seung-hee	Dong-kyu	Jong-hoon	Seung-hee	Jeong-jin	Seung-hee						
12	Jong-hoon	Jae-hyuk	Dong-kyu	Jong-hoon	Jian	Jian						
13	Jae-hyuk	Yaelim	Seung-hee	Yong-soo	Jae-hyuk							
14	Jian	So-hyun	Yong-soo	Dong-kyu								
15	Dong-kyu; Yaelim	Jian	So-hyun									
16	Dong-kyu; Yaelim	Ji-in										

The contestant was eliminated
The contestant was eliminated outside of judging panel
The contestant won the competition

- In episode 5, there were two separate eliminations. The first took place outside of judging panel after a runway challenge, where Jian was eliminated. The second was a regular elimination, and it took place at panel.
- Episodes 7 & 10 featured double eliminations with the bottom three contestants being in danger of elimination.
- Episode 11 was a runway and talk show episode.
