= Sora Choi =

South Korean fashion model (born 1992)

- 최소라
- Born: September 5, 1992 (age 34); Bucheon, South Korea
- Occupation: Model
- Years active: 2012–present
- Spouse: Kove Lee (m. 2019)
- Children: 1
- Modeling information
- Height: 5 ft 10 1/2 in (1.79 m)
- Hair color: Black
- Eye color: Brown
- Agency: Gost (Seoul); The Lions (New York); Ford Models (Paris); Special Management (Milan)

Korean name
- Hangul: 최소라
- RR: Choe Sora
- MR: Ch'oe Sora

Sora Choi (Korean: 최소라; born September 5, 1992) is a South Korean fashion model. She won the third cycle of the reality television show Korea's Next Top Model. She currently ranks on models.com's 'Industry Icons' list and is known as being one of the most in-demand models of her generation. As of 2024, Choi has walked in 537 fashion shows and has appeared on 17 Vogue covers.

== Early life ==
Choi was born and raised in Bucheon, South Korea. She studied modeling at Dongduk Women's University.

== Career ==
=== 2012–2015: Early work ===
Choi was scouted as a model while accompanying a friend to a casting at an agency during her junior year of high school. Instead of her friend, she received an offer to sign with the agency.

Choi made her debut in a fashion college graduation show. She gained recognition in the South Korean fashion industry after winning the third cycle of Korea's Next Top Model in 2012. That same year, she appeared in her first editorial and cover for W Korea.

Choi made her first international runway appearance by opening Christopher Raeburn's Spring 2014 show in September 2013. She made her official international runway debut at Louis Vuitton's cruise show in May 2014, held in Monaco.

During the spring 2015 season, Choi became the first South Korean model to be selected as Louis Vuitton's city exclusive for Paris Fashion Week, chosen by Nicolas Ghesquiere. That season, she also walked for Alexander Wang, Fendi, Versace, and became the first asian model to walk for Calvin Klein. In October 2014, Models.com selected her as a 'Top Newcomer.'

=== 2016–present: Rise to prominence ===
During the spring 2016 season, Choi became the first asian model to walk for Hedi Slimane’s Saint Laurent fashion show. She was described by Vogue as “one of the most popular faces on the runways” in the fall 2016 season, after walking in over 50 shows across New York, Paris, London, and Milan. Starting in 2016, she continued as Louis Vuitton's city exclusive for two years, starring in the brand’s advertising campaigns six times. In 2017, she was listed on Models.com's 'Top 50 models' list.

Choi has since walked for brands such as Prada, Gucci, Miu Miu, Chanel, Hermès, Alexander McQueen, Givenchy, Lanvin, Dior, Celine, Moschino, Valentino, Proenza Schouler, Loewe, Michael Kors, Paco Rabanne, Marc Jacobs, Burberry, Balenciaga and many others. In 2019, after walking a total of 89 shows, she became the model who walked the most shows that year.

Choi has appeared in over 100 international advertising campaigns for brands including Alexander McQueen, Louis Vuitton, Saint Laurent, Versace, Dolce & Gabbana, Marc Jacobs, Coach, Prada, Bottega Veneta, Tom Ford, Gucci, Valentino, Burberry, NARS, Dior, Salvatore Ferragamo, Hugo Boss, Fendi, Max Mara, Moschino, Michael kors, Mugler and more.

Choi has been featured in editorials for magazines such as the American, British, Italian, Chinese, Japanese, German, and Korean editions of Vogue, as well as V Magazine, Interview, i-D, Dazed, Elle, and T Magazine, among many others. She has been featured on the covers of multiple international editions of Vogue, including Italian, Korean, Hong Kong, Spanish, and Japanese. She has also appeared on the covers of American, Korean, and Kazakhstan editions of Harper's Bazaar, as well as the American and Korean editions of W. Additionally, she has been on the covers of i-D, Dust, Document Journal, Perfect Magazine, Numéro China, M Le Magazine du Monde and more.

In December 2020, Choi won Models.com's 'Readers' Choice Model of the Year' award. Since 2021, she has been ranked as an 'Industry Icon' by the platform. In October 2021, she received the Minister of Culture, Sports, and Tourism Commendation at the Korean Popular Culture and Arts Awards. In October 2022, she was included in The Business of Fashion's 'The BoF 500,' a list of individuals that are considered most influential in shaping the global fashion industry. In January 2023, Choi appeared on her second Vogue Italia cover as a solo feature. In April, she closed Louis Vuitton's first-ever Pre-Fall runway show, which took place on the Jamsu Bridge in Seoul. In the following month, she opened Gucci's first Cruise collection show in Asia, presented at Gyeongbokgung Palace in Seoul. In September, she appeared in Victoria’s Secret’s The Tour ’23 fashion show and advertising campaign. Throughout 2023, she featured in advertising campaigns for Versace, Fendi, Giorgio Armani, H&M x Mugler, Louis Vuitton, Valentino, Fendi x Marc Jacobs, Gucci, Alexander McQueen, Burberry, Zara x Steven Meisel, Victoria’s Secret, and Swarovski.

After a year-long break from modeling, Choi appeared in Dolce & Gabbana's Spring/Summer 2025 advertising campaign, photographed by Steven Meisel. She later returned to the runway, closing Prada's Fall/Winter 2025 show at Milan Fashion Week.

== Personal life ==
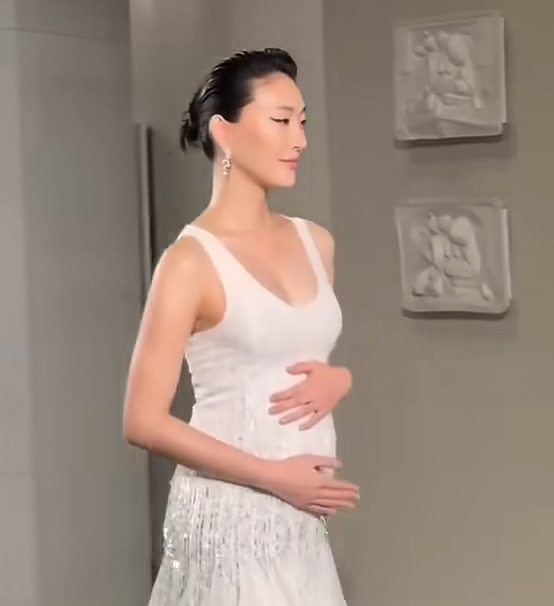
Choi walking the runway for Chanel in May 2026

In August 2019, Choi married Korean photographer Kove Lee in Bali, Indonesia. Instead of a traditional white wedding dress, she wore a custom black Prada dress, which was a gift from Miuccia Prada.

On May 26, 2026, Choi walked the runway at Chanel’s Métiers d’art show at the Centre Pompidou Hanwha in Seoul, where her pregnancy was publicly revealed. Her agency later confirmed that she was pregnant with her first child.

== Filmography ==
Music video appearances
Year	Title	Artist	Role
2013	Eyekiss	Lovelybut	Girl at the cafe
2013	Gentleman	Psy	Yellow bikini girl
2025	Gorgeous	Doja Cat	Herself

Films
Year	Title	Role	Notes
2020	Saint Laurent - Summer of '21	Herself	Short film
