= Madison Stubbington =

Australian fashion model from Adelaide

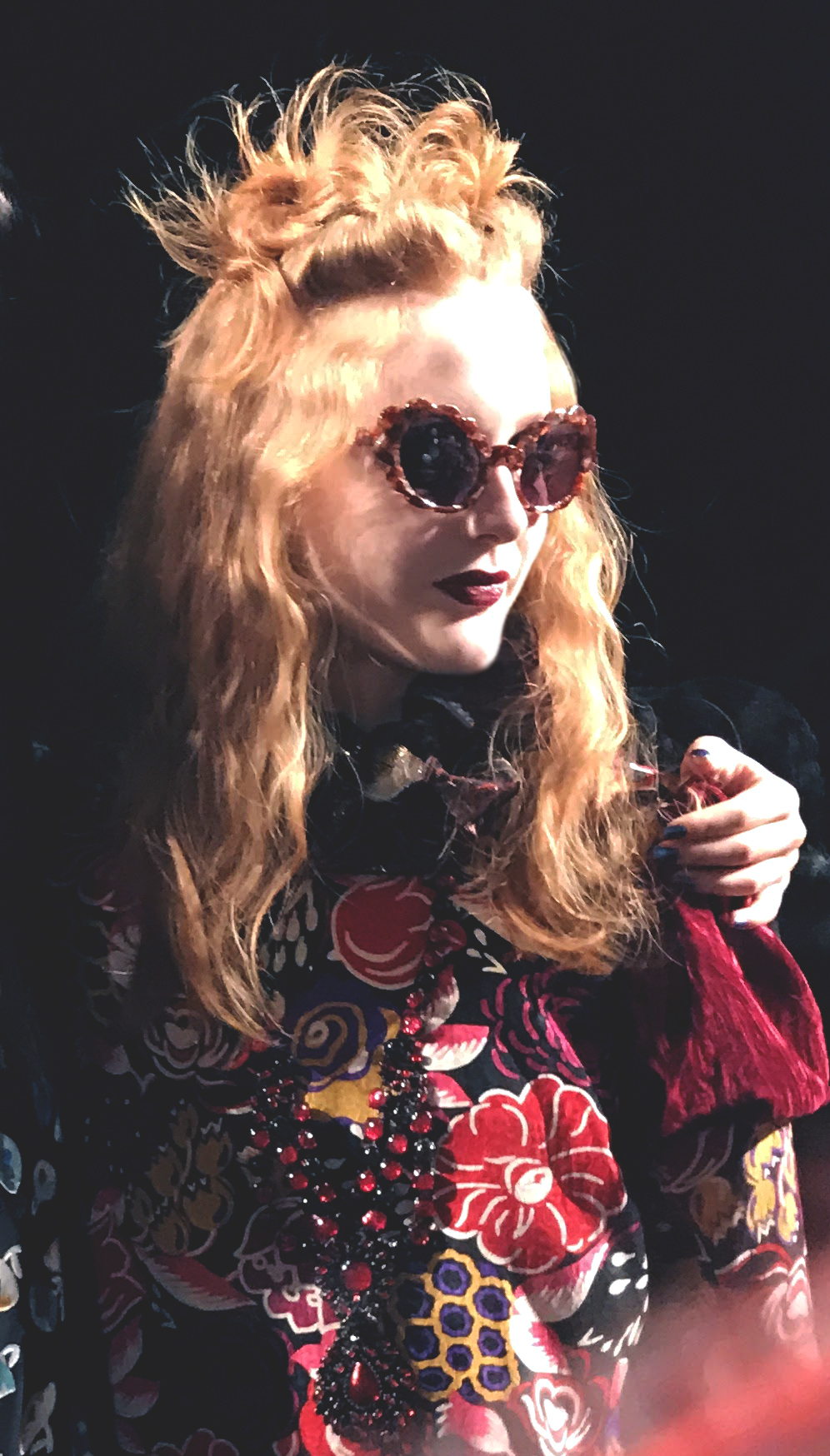
- Stubbington at Anna Sui's Fall-Winter 2017 fashion show
- Born: Madison Louise Stubbington; 17 August 1997 (age 29); Adelaide, Australia
- Occupation: Fashion model
- Modeling information
- Height: 1.78 m (5 ft 10 in)
- Hair color: Red
- Eye color: Blue
- Agency: Bravo Models (Tokyo); AVE. Management (Singapore); Pride Models (Adelaide); Kult (London, Sydney); Wave Management (Milan); Pride Models (Adelaide); New Icon Model Management (New York City)

Madison Louise Stubbington is an Australian fashion model.

== Career ==
Stubbington was discovered at a modelling competition in Adelaide when she was 14. In her debut season, she walked for Saint Laurent (for whom she was also cast in a campaign co-starring Harleth Kuusik), Balenciaga, Dion Lee, Fendi, Giambattista Valli, Vionnet, Louis Vuitton, Jean-Paul Gaultier, Yohji Yamamoto, and Miu Miu. Stubbington appeared in a Vogue editorial featuring famous gingers. She took a hiatus from modelling, for health reasons, and returned at a healthier size. The British organization Advertising Standards Authority had previously banned a Gucci advertisement which originally appeared in The Times because a complainant believed she and American model Avery Blanchard appeared to be too thin, although it decided that Stubbington was and despite the fact that the advertisement campaign was only for the temporary resort season. Gucci responded with dissent. In 2021, Stubbing walked in Gucci's "Love Parade" show in Hollywood.

Stubbington was ranked on models.com's "Top 50 Models" list.
