= Johnson Hartig =

American fashion designer (born 1970)

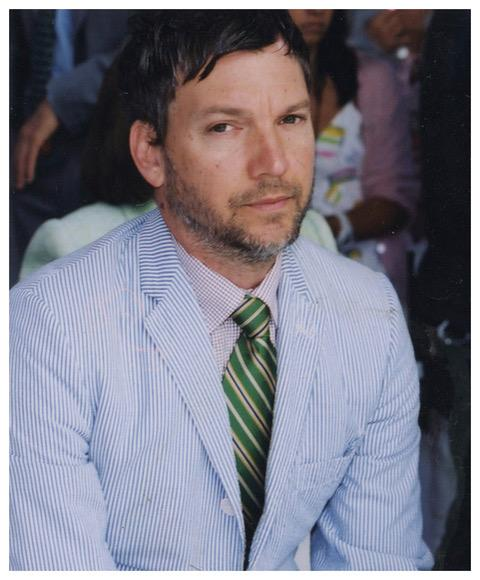
- Johnson Hartig 2018
- Born: September 25, 1970 (age 55); Whittier, California, U.S.
- Occupation: Fashion designer
- Years active: 2001 - present
- Notable work: Libertine clothing

Johnson Hartig is an American fashion designer. He co-founded the fashion line Libertine and is the current CEO and Creative Director.

Hartig's work has been featured in Vogue, The World of Interiors, New York Times, and has been worn by a number of celebrities.

"The clothes are joyful, multimedia, collaged art pieces as likely to be worn by society matriarchs as twentysomething rock 'n' rollers,” according to the Los Angeles Times.

His book, Libertine: The Creative Beauty, Humor, and Inspiration Behind the Cult Label, was published by Rizzoli in 2015.

== Early life and education ==
Hartig was born in Whittier, California. As a youngster, he was taught to sew by his grandmother and the lady next door. Later, he traveled the world learning about different cultures because his father worked for an international oil company. Returning to the United States, he attended California State University.

== Career ==
Settling in Los Angeles, Hartig founded the Libertine clothing line in 2001 with DKNY graphic designer Cindy Greene, a vocalist of electro-pop band Fischerspooner. Originally, his designs—vintage style with silk-screened art like skulls, 19th century portraits, and crystal beading—caught the attention of fashion designers like Karl Lagerfeld as well as artists such as Damien Hirst. In 2007, Hartig designed one of Target's Go International collaborations, and dissolved his partnership with Greene soon after.

Hartig first met Vogue editor Anna Wintour in 2003, the magazine subsequently has featured his clothes several times. The following year Libertine was nominated as one of the 10 semi-finalists in the first CFDA/Vogue Fashion Fund which was documented in the film Seamless, directed by Douglass Keeve.

He became one of the first designers to create a line for the Wear LACMA project, which was sold to benefit the Los Angeles County Museum of Art. For the museum's 50th anniversary in 2015, Hartig was one of those who created new Wear LACMA pieces to mark the occasion.

On September 22 of that same year, Rizzoli Publishing released the book, Libertine: The Creative Beauty, Humor, and Inspiration Behind the Cult Label, which was written by Hartig, with a foreword by Thom Browne and Betty Halbreich. The book contains a history of the designer's clothing line, as well as documentation of some of his antics including the time Hartig took a bath in Karl Lagerfield's hotel room tub, swapping some of his clothing for original art pieces from Damien Hirst, and conning Cher into signing a note claiming he is her favorite designer.

In November 2016, at an invite-only Libertine event at Neiman Marcus, former San Francisco mayor Willie Brown presented Hartig with a government proclamation signifying the key to the city.

In 2019, Hartig created luxury-apparel line to honor Jimi Hendrix in honor of the 50th anniversary of the musician's Electric Ladyland album.

Among the celebrities who wear Hartig's Libertine clothes include Mick Jagger, Offset, Martha Stewart, Young Thug, Gwen Stefani, 2 Chainz, Beyonce, Katy Perry, LL Cool J, Sting, Cher, Taylor Swift, P Diddy, Usher, Brad Pitt, Gwyneth Paltrow, Scarlett Johansson, Cyndi Lauper, Brandi Carlile, and Damien Hirst.

In February 2022, Hartig created luxury-apparel line with fashion brand Desigual with a collection of women's clothing that showed its funniest and most non-conformist version and celebrated excess, ornament, roundness and punk.

== Achievements ==
Year	Organization	Recognition
2003	Vogue	Council of Fashion Designers of America Fashion Fund Award Semi-Finalist
2009	European Design Association	Artist of the Millennium Award
2016	City of San Francisco	Key to the City Proclamation
2017	MTV	Celebrated Designer Award
2018	The Fashion Group International	Career Achievement
2018	PS Art Association	PS heArt Award
2018	Fashion Group International of Dallas	Career Achievement in Fashion
