= Rad Hourani =

Canadian fashion designer and artist

- Born: 1982 (age 43–44)
- Education: High school
- Occupations: artist, designer
- Years active: 2002–present
- Known for: Unisex /Genderless fashion

Rad Hourani (born 1982) is a Canadian fashion designer and artist known for his neutral, genderless creations.

== Early life ==
Rad Hourani was born in Jordan to a Jordanian Father and a Syrian mother.

== Career ==
He created his unisex brand Rad Hourani in 2007 along with a unisex gender-neutral ready-to-wear collection.

Two years later, he presented his first photo and video exhibition at the Jardins du Palais-Royal in Paris and continues exhibiting his photographic work around the world, including a film projection at Centre Pompidou in Paris, a solo show in Montreal at the PHI Centre, an interactive installation at Tate Modern in London, as well as different installations at the FIT Museum in New York, MU Art Center in the Netherlands, the Herning Museum of Contemporary Art in Denmark and the Cooper Hewitt Design Museum in New York. His most recent multidisciplinary exhibitions were presented at Arsenal Contemporary Art Center in Montreal, at the Museum of Fine Arts, Boston, a film installation at the Guggenheim Museum in Bilbao.

His work is included in the permanent collection of the Cooper Hewitt, Smithsonian Design Museum.

In January 2013, Hourani became an invited member of the Chambre Syndicale de la Haute Couture in Paris, making him both the first Canadian to show during Couture Week, as well as the first designer to show a unisex collection at this event.
