= Korea's Next Top Model season 2 =

Korea's Next Top Model
- Season 2
- Season 2 cast
- Presented by: Jang Yoon-ju
- Judges: Jang Yoon-ju; Lee Hye-ju; Jung Goo-ho; Jo Seon-hee; Ha Sang-baek
- No. of episodes: 14

Release
- Original network: OnStyle
- Original release: July 9 – October 15, 2011

Season chronology
- ← Previous; Season 1 Next → Season 3

Korea's Next Top Model, season 2 (or Do-jeon Supermodel Korea, season 2) is the second season of the Korean reality television show in which a number of aspiring models compete for the title of Korea's Next Top Model and a chance to start their career in the modelling industry.

This season featured fifteen contestants in its final cast. The prizes for this season included: A cash prize of 100,000,000 South Korean won, a cover shoot and editorial in W Magazine Korea, a contract with SK-II and a modelling contract with ESteem Entertainment.

The winner of the competition was 17-year-old Jin Jung-sun.

== Cast ==
=== Contestants ===
(Ages stated are at start of contest and use the Korean system of determining age)

Contestant	Age	Height	Finish	Place
Yoon Yoo-jin	21	1.71 m (5 ft 7 1/2 in)	Episode 1	15
Lee Eun-sook	21	1.86 m (6 ft 1 in)	Episode 2	14
Ko Jung-sun	27	1.68 m (5 ft 6 in)	Episode 3	13
Park So-yeon	23	1.73 m (5 ft 8 in)	Episode 4	12–11
Jenny Fuglsang	24	1.78 m (5 ft 10 in)	Episode 4	12–11
Choi Ji-hye	27	1.73 m (5 ft 8 in)	Episode 5	10
Ko Eun-bi	17	1.67 m (5 ft 5 1/2 in)	Episode 6	9
Lee Sung-sil	25	1.76 m (5 ft 9 1/2 in)	Episode 7	8
Lee Sun-young	24	1.70 m (5 ft 7 in)	Episode 8	7–6
Lee Song-i	24	1.72 m (5 ft 7 1/2 in)	Episode 8	7–6
Um Yoo-jung	19	1.72 m (5 ft 7 1/2 in)	Episode 9	5
Lee Jenny	27	1.74 m (5 ft 8 1/2 in)	Episode 11	4–3
Song Hae-na	25	1.69 m (5 ft 6 1/2 in)	Episode 11	4–3
Park Seul-gi	25	1.77 m (5 ft 9 1/2 in)	Episode 13	2
Jin Jung-sun	17	1.74 m (5 ft 8 1/2 in)	Episode 13	1

=== Judges ===
- Jang Yoon-ju – Host & main judge
- Lee Hye-ju - Judge & W magazine editor
- Jo Seon-hee – Judge & photographer
- Jung Goo-ho - Judge & fashion designer

=== Other cast members ===
- Ha Sang-baek – Designer & photo shoot director

== Episodes ==
No. overall	No. in season	Title	Original release date
14	1	"Episode 1"	TBA
Special guests: Featured photographer:
15	2	"Episode 2"	TBA
Special guests: Featured photographer:
16	3	"Episode 3"	TBA
Special guests: Featured photographer:
17	4	"Episode 4"	TBA
Special guests: Featured photographer:
18	5	"Episode 5"	TBA
Special guests: Featured photographer:
19	6	"Episode 6"	TBA
Special guests: Featured photographer:
20	7	"Episode 7"	TBA
Special guests: Featured photographer:
21	8	"Episode 8"	TBA
Special guests: Featured photographer:
22	9	"Episode 9"	TBA
Special guests: Featured photographer:
23	10	"Episode 10"	TBA
Special guests: Featured photographer:
24	11	"Episode 11"	TBA
Special guests: Featured photographer:
25	12	"Episode 12"	TBA
Special guests: Featured photographer:
26	13	"Episode 13"	TBA
Special guests: Featured photographer:
27	14	"Episode 14"	TBA
Special guests: Featured photographer:

== Results ==
Order	Episodes											
Order	1		2	3	4	5	6	7	8	9	11	13
1	Sung-sil	Jenny L.	Jenny L.	Hae-na	Jung-sun J.	Yoo-jung	Hae-na	Seul-gi	Seul-gi	Seul-gi	Jung-sun J.	Jung-sun J.
2	Yoo-jung	Jung-sun J.	Jung-sun J.	Jenny L.	Hae-na	Jenny L.	Jung-sun J.	Jenny L.	Hae-na	Hae-na	Seul-gi	Seul-gi
3	Yoo-jin	Yoo-jung	Hae-na	Sun-young	Jenny L.	Sung-sil	Sung-sil	Jung-sun J.	Jung-sun J.	Jung-sun J.	Hae-na; Jenny L.	
4	So-yeon	Seul-gi	Song-i	Seul-gi	Yoo-jung	Jung-sun J.	Sun-young	Hae-na	Jenny L.	Jenny L.	Hae-na; Jenny L.	
5	Jung-sun K.	Sung-sil	Ji-hye	Sung-sil	Seul-gi	Eun-bi	Jenny L.	Sun-young	Yoo-jung	Yoo-jung		
6	Song-i	Hae-na	Sung-sil	Jung-sun J.	Ji-hye	Song-i	Seul-gi	Yoo-jung	Sun-young			
7	Jenny L.	Song-i	Eun-bi	Eun-bi	Sun-young	Seul-gi	Yoo-jung	Song-i	Song-i			
8	Eun-sook	Jung-sun K.	So-yeon	Jenny F.	Eun-bi	Sun-young	Song-i	Sung-sil				
9	Hae-na	So-yeon	Seul-gi	Ji-hye	Sung-sil	Hae-na	Eun-bi					
10	Eun-bi	Jenny F.	Yoo-jung	Song-i	Song-i	Ji-hye						
11	Seul-gi	Ji-hye	Sun-young	Yoo-jung	Jenny F. So-yeon							
12	Jenny F.	Eun-bi	Jung-sun K.	So-yeon	Jenny F. So-yeon							
13	Ji-hye	Sun-young	Jenny F.	Jung-sun K.								
14	Jung-sun J. Sun-young	Eun-sook	Eun-sook									
15	Jung-sun J. Sun-young	Yoo-jin										

The contestant was a separate addition later added to the cast.
The contestant was eliminated.
The contestant won the competition.

- During the first half of episode 1, the pool of 26 semifinalists was reduced to the final thirteen contestants. Jung-sun J. and Sun-young were later added to the final cast after initially being rejected.
- Episodes 4, 8, and 11 featured double eliminations with the bottom three contestants being in danger of elimination.
- Episode 10 was a recap episode.
- Episode 12 was a reunion episode.
