= Choi Han-bit =

South Korean model (born 1987)

- Born: 16 June 1987 (age 39); Gangneung, South Korea
- Occupations: Model; actress
- Years active: 2009-present
- Spouse: Choi Tae-il (m. 2023)
- Modeling information
- Height: 1.82 m (5 ft 11 1/2 in)
- Agency: Stershop Entertainment, Gaon Entertainment

Korean name
- Hangul: 최한빛
- RR: Choe Hanbit
- MR: Ch'oe Hanbit

Choi Han-bit (Korean: 최한빛) is a South Korean model, actress and singer. She was a member of the South-Korean girl group Mercury. She is a graduate of the School of Dance at the Korean National University of Arts in Seoul, where she majored in Korean traditional dance. (Note: An article in The Korea Times states that Choi underwent sex reassignment surgery in 2007, and suggests that she is still a student at the Korea National University of Arts. This would seem to contradict articles in The Chosun Ilbo and The Korea Herald which state that her surgery was in 2006 and that she is a graduate of the university.) With the support of her parents, Choi underwent male-to-female sex reassignment surgery in 2006. She changed her given name to Han-bit, and is legally recognized as female in South Korea. In an interview, Choi said that "living with the female body itself brought me the greatest feeling of euphoria", but also that she has "a fond memory of the past before the operation". Prior to her surgery, she had appeared on the Seoul Broadcasting System (SBS) television show Yoo Jae-suk's Jinsil Game in 2005. She was a contestant on Korea's Next Top Model season 3, where she ended 10th.

== Career ==
After transitioning, Choi began to pursue her lifelong ambition of becoming a model. In 2009, she was amongst more than 1,200 applicants to the annual SBS-sponsored Super Model Contest, and gained public attention by progressing through the contest's preliminary rounds. Choi's participation drew mixed reactions from internet users and other contestants, but SBS officials stated that they would view it as a "violation of human rights" to disqualify a transgender individual whose legal sex was female. As one of the contest's 32 finalists, Choi automatically qualified as a professional model. Despite this, Choi claims to have faced discrimination in the modelling industry, having been refused participation in a fashion show without any clear reason. Since taking part in Super Model Contest, Choi has appeared on a number of television shows and has expressed a desire to become an actress. She has said that she hopes to marry around the age of thirty, and will adopt two children.

== Personal life ==
On 18 June 2023, Choi married businessman Choi Tae-il, who is seven years older than her in Gangneung.

== Filmography ==
- A Perfect Woman (2010-03-08 – 2010-04-26) – Herself
- The Princess' Man (2011-07-20 – 2011-10-06) – Mu-yeong
- Getting Aunt Gogong-sil (2011)
- Korea's Next Top Model season 3 (2012) – Herself (contestant)
