= SK-II =

Japanese cosmetics company

- Native name: エスケーツー
- Industry: Skin care
- Founded: 1980; 46 years ago
- Headquarters: Japan
- Area served: Worldwide
- Products: Cosmetics and beauty products
- Parent: Procter & Gamble
- Website: www.sk-ii.com

SK-II (pronounced S-K-Two) is a Japanese-based multinational cosmetics brand launched in the early 1980s, based on a compound derived from yeast. It is owned by parent company Procter & Gamble (P&G) and is sold and marketed as a premium skin care solution in East Asia as well as North America, Europe and Australia.

== History ==
SK-II was developed in the 1970s by Japanese scientists investigating the use of more naturally derived ingredients after it was observed that elderly workers at a sake brewery had smooth, clear and young-looking hands from years of submerging them in the fermented yeast. A yeast extract that the company calls pitera was eventually isolated for cosmetic use and the brand was launched in the early 1980s. P&G acquired the brand with its purchase of Max Factor in 1991, and expanded its sale from Japan to China, South Korea, in 2000 to the UK, and subsequently to the US, restricting initial sales to a few high-end stores where "consultants" introduced customers to the brand. As of 2018, it is also sold in Australia, Indonesia, Malaysia, Singapore, Spain, and Thailand.

== Controversies in China and South Korea ==
In April 2005, P&G agreed to pay a 200,000 yuan fine after a customer in China alleged inaccurate advertising of an SK-II product and that it had caused an allergic reaction. P&G China withdrew several products, while requiring consumers to sign a "safe product" agreement releasing P&G from liability in order to return those they had bought. By the end of that week, P&G had suspended sales of the brand altogether in China and closed its sales counters there, instituting a hotline for refund applications. SK-II sales were also suspended for approximately two weeks in South Korea, resuming after authorities announced the products were safe. P&G announced it would resume selling the products in China in late 2006, after regulators declared that the trace elements of these substances in cosmetics were not likely to be injurious to human health.
