= KPlus =

South Korean model management company

KPlus Holdings Co., Ltd.
- Native name: 주식회사 케이플러스홀딩스
- Formerly: K-Plus; YG KPlus
- Industry: Fashion; Advertisement; Event Production; Talent Management
- Founded: 2008
- Founder: Go Eun-kyung
- Headquarters: Gangnam-gu, Seoul, South Korea
- Key people: Go Eun-kyung (founder and chief executive officer)
- Parent: Chorokbaem Media (50%) (2022- present); YG Entertainment (2014-2022)
- Website: kplusholdings.com

KPlus (Korean: 케이플러스) is a South Korean model and actors management company established by fashion model-turned-CEO Go Eun-kyung in 2008.

== History ==
K-Plus was founded by former model Go Eun-kyung in 2008 to train future models and fashion industry professionals.

In February 2014, K-Plus signed a contract for strategic partnership and share investment with talent agency YG Entertainment and finalised the merger with a new name called "YG KPLUS" in September. Go's former protege model-turned-actor Cha Seung-won would be training K-Plus models to become future actors.

In September 2014, top model Kang Seung-hyun signed a contract with YGKPlus.

In June 2017, for the first time in Vietnam's Next Top Model, starting from All-stars' cycle onwards, the winner will receive this contract for him/her to include in the roster list of models.

In May 2022, Chorokbaem Media acquired 50% of the company's shares. On August 22, 2022, it was announced that the company would change its name from YGKPLUS to KPLUS after the acquisition, while still collaborating with YG in the future.

== Female models ==
- Ahn Ye-won (Produce 48 contestant, eliminated in episode 5)
- Bae Yoon-young
- Cho Yelim
- Choi Ah-reum*
- Choi Ha-rim*
- Choi Jung-in*
- Choi Yeon-soo (Produce 48 contestant, eliminated in episode 5)
- Choi Young-ji
- Choi Sae-hui
- Choi Sora
- Ellis Ahn
- Gil Minso
- Ha Naryoung
- Han Hye-yeon
- Hanna N
- Huh Bo-mi
- Hong Hyo
- Hong Na-kyung*
- Hwang Hyun-joo
- Hwang Seung-eon
- Hwang So-hee
- Hyun Ji-eun
- Jennie Kim*
- Jeon Min ok
- Ji ESuu
- Ji Ho-jin
- Jo Hye-joo
- Ju Hee-jeong
- Jung Han-sol
- Jung Ji-young
- Jung Soo-hyun*
- Jung Yoo-sun
- Kang Yoon-ji
- Kim Eun-sun*
- Kim Hae-ah
- Kim Hyo-kyung
- Kim Hyun-hee
- Kim Jisoo*
- Kim Min-Kyeung
- Kim Sae-in*
- Kim Sang-Won
- Kim Su-bin*
- Kim Yae-ji
- Kim Ye-rim*
- Ko Eun-bi*
- Kwon Ji-ya*
- Lalisa Manoban*
- Lee Ha-eun
- Lee Ho-jung
- Lee Jay
- Lee Ji-hye*
- Lee Jung-hyun
- Lee Roo-young
- Lee Seung-mee
- Lee Song-yi
- Lee Su-jin
- Lee Sung-kyung
- Lee Yeon-joo*
- Nadine Lee
- Oh Hye-ji
- Park Chaeyoung*
- Park Jung-min*
- Park Sae-jin*
- Park Se-jeong
- Park Su-jin
- Park Sun-ha
- Park Yae-woon
- Shim Soyoung
- Shin Ha-young
- Shin Hey-nam
- Shin Hye-jin*
- Shin Hyun-ji
- Shin Yae-min*
- Song Hyun-min
- Song Jae-hee*
- Suh Minji*
- Tiana Tolstoi
- Um Ye-jin
- Um Yoo-jung
- Wu I-Hua
- Yang Rira
- Yeo Yeon-hui
- Yoo Eun-bi
- Yoon Seon-ah*
- Jéanjel Sucnaan*

(* indicates models in Development)

== Male models ==
- Ahn Juni
- Bae Joon-seok*
- Bang Joo-ho
- Cheon Sang-hun*
- Cho David
- Cho Hwan*
- Cho Hyo-in
- Cho Jae Hyung*
- Cho Sung-hoon
- Choi Chang-wook
- Choi Han-bin
- Choi Jeong-gab*
- Choi Yeon-kyu
- Erick Vic.
- Go Ung-ho
- Ha Seok-hwan*
- Han Sol*
- Jang Ki-yong
- Joo Woo-jae
- Joel Roberts*
- Jeon Jun-yeong*
- Jeong Rok-hui
- Jiwon Hyuk
- Jung Hyo-joon* (Produce 101 Season 2 contestant)
- Jung Jong-won*
- Jung Sung-joon
- Jung Ui-sung
- Jung Yongsoo
- Kang Hui
- Kang Hyuk-moon
- Kang Sung-jin
- Kang Won-jae
- Kim Alex*
- Kim Bo-heon
- Kim Gun-woo*
- Kim Gyu-ho
- Kim Hak-soo
- Kim Han-byul
- Kim Ho-sung*
- Kim Hyun-jin
- Kim Hyun-woo* (Produce 101 Season 2 contestant)
- Kim Jong-hoon
- Kim Jung-sik
- Kim Ki-bum
- Kim Kwan-joon*
- Kim Min-jong
- Kim Pil-su
- Kim Seung-eun
- Kim Seung-hyun
- Kim Sung-yeon
- Kim Tae-wan
- Kim Tae-woo
- Kim Woo-ram*
- Kim Young-seok
- Kwon Hyun-bin (Produce 101 Season 2 contestant and member of South Korean boy group JBJ)
- Kwon Ju-hyung*
- Lee Bom-chan
- Lee Gi-hean
- Lee Hyun-jun
- Lee Hyun-wook
- Lee Hyung-seok
- Lee Jae-seok*
- Lee Jin-kyeong
- Lee Ji-seok
- Lee Keun-yong
- Lee Ki-taek
- Lee Myoun-gil
- Lee Seok-chan
- Lee Soo-min*
- Lee Soo-hyuk
- Lee Woo-chan*
- Lim Hoo-seok
- Lim Jae-hyung
- Meng Joo-ho
- Nam Goong-dam
- Nikita Tolstoi
- Oh Jae-young*
- Park Bo-sung
- Park Byung-min
- Park Hong
- Park Hyeong-seop
- Park Jong-ik*
- Park Ki-tae
- Park Min-Seop
- Park Yae-chan*
- Seo Soo-won
- Seo Hong-seok
- Seok Ji-an
- Seong Woo-jin
- Shin Jae-hyuk
- Shin Dongho
- Shin Yong-guk
- Song Kyung-mok
- Yoon Jun-woo
- Yoon Su-ho
- Yu Hyun-woo
- Won Jeong Hwang
- Woo Jin-kyung

(* indicates models in Development)

== Actors ==
- Kang Dong-wook
- Go Yi-jin
- Gi Eun-su
- Yoo Ji-ae
- Kim Min-kyeung
- Kim Hyun-jae
- Nam Gung-dam
- Nam Gyu-hee
- Shin Ji-hoon

== See also ==
- List of modeling agencies
