= List of Vogue China cover models =

This list of 服饰与美容 Vogue China cover models (2005–present) is a catalog of cover models who have appeared on the cover of Vogue China, the Chinese edition of American fashion magazine Vogue.

== 2000s ==
=== 2005 ===
Issue	Cover model	Photographer
September	Du Juan; Gemma Ward; Wang Wenqin; Tong Chenjie; Liu Dan; Ni Mingxi	Patrick Demarchelier
October	Gisele Bündchen	Mario Sorrenti
November	Hana Soukupová	Tom Munro
December	Nicole Kidman	Patrick Demarchelier

=== 2006 ===
Issue	Cover model	Photographer
January	Kate Moss	Mario Sorrenti
February	Du Juan	Mario Sorrenti
March	Gemma Ward	Mario Sorrenti
April	Daria Werbowy	Mario Sorrenti
May	Lily Donaldson	Mario Sorrenti
June	Freja Beha Erichsen	Mario Sorrenti
July	Doutzen Kroes	Mario Sorrenti
August	Mariacarla Boscono	Mario Sorrenti
September	Gemma Ward; Du Juan; Sasha Pivovarova	Mario Sorrenti
October	Maggie Cheung	Paolo Roversi
November	Lily Donaldson	Mario Sorrenti
December	Gisele Bündchen	Mario Sorrenti

=== 2007 ===
Issue	Cover model	Photographer
January	Natalia Vodianova	Mario Sorrenti
February	Du Juan	Michael Thompson
March	Gisele Bündchen	Michael Thompson
April	Shu Qi	Mario Sorrenti
May	Lily Donaldson	Michael Thompson
June	Wang Wenqin	Greg Kadel
July	Doutzen Kroes	Michael Thompson
August	Lily Donaldson	Patrick Demarchelier
September	Stephanie Shiu; Du Juan; Mackenzie Hamilton; Emma Pei	Greg Kadel
October	Mackenzie Hamilton	Greg Kadel
November	Emma Pei	Greg Kadel
December	Du Juan	Patrick Demarchelier

=== 2008 ===
Issue	Cover model	Photographer
January	Lily Donaldson	Patrick Demarchelier
February	Du Juan	Mario Sorrenti
March	Sasha Pivovarova	Mario Sorrenti
April	Zhang Ziyi	Mario Sorrenti
May	Zhou Xun	David Sims
June	Shu Qi	Lachlan Bailey
July	Gisele Bündchen	Mario Sorrenti
August	Maggie Cheung	Mario Sorrenti
September	Raquel Zimmermann	Mario Sorrenti
October	Du Juan	Mario Sorrenti
November	Agyness Deyn	Mario Sorrenti
December	Kate Moss; Maggie Cheung	Mario Sorrenti

=== 2009 ===
Issue	Cover model	Photographer
January	Naomi Campbell	Mario Sorrenti
February	Wei Tang	Sølve Sundsbø
March	Anne Hathaway	Mario Testino
April	Lucy Liu	Mario Sorrenti
May	Du Juan	Mario Sorrenti
June	Lily Donaldson	Mario Sorrenti
July	Anna Selezneva	Camilla Åkrans
August	Sigrid Agren	Terry Tsiolis
September	Maggie Cheung	Nick Knight
October	Natasha Poly	Patrick Demarchelier
November	Zhou Xun	Norman Jean Roy
December	Song Hye Kyo	Patrick Demarchelier

== 2010s ==
=== 2010 ===
Issue	Cover model	Photographer
January	Kendra Spears	Lachlan Bailey
February	Shu Pei Qin, Mirte Maas	Patrick Demarchelier
March	Du Juan; Lily Donaldson; Anna Jagodzińska; Constance Jablonski; Karlie Kloss; Liu Wen	Patrick Demarchelier
April	Li Bingbing	Max Vadukul
May	Natalia Vodianova	Paolo Roversi & Peter Lindbergh
June	Wei Tang	Peter Lindbergh
July	Sarah Jessica Parker	Mario Testino
August	Karlie Kloss	Peter Lindbergh
September	Liu Wen; Ming Xi; Shu Pei Qin; Tao Okamoto; Fei Fei Sun	Daniel Jackson & Peter Lindbergh
October	Kate Winslet	Peter Lindbergh
November	Patricia van der Vliet & Karlie Kloss	Max Vadukul
December	Lara Stone	Willy Vanderperre

=== 2011 ===
Issue	Cover model	Photographer
January	Li Bingbing	Max Vadukul
February	Gisele Bündchen	Patrick Demarchelier
March	Lara Stone	Inez & Vinoodh
April	Scarlett Johansson	Peter Lindbergh
May	Frida Gustavsson	Arthur Elgort
June	Natalia Vodianova	Peter Lindbergh
July	Fan Bing Bing	Josh Olins
August	Ming Xi	Daniel Jackson
September	Du Juan; Shu Pei Qin; Fei Fei Sun; Liu Wen; Ming Xi; Sui He	Inez & Vinoodh
October	Maggie Q	Daniel Jackson
November	Edita Vilkevičiūtė	Peter Lindbergh
December	Zhou Xun	Sølve Sundsbø

=== 2012 ===
Issue	Cover model	Photographer
January	Ming Xi	Li Qi
February	Zhao Wei	Kai Z. Feng
March	Isabeli Fontana & Natasha Poly	Inez & Vinoodh
April	Fan Bing Bing	Inez & Vinoodh
May	Arizona Muse	Josh Olins
June	Doutzen Kroes	Sølve Sundsbø
July	Monika Jagaciak & Liu Wen	Patrick Demarchelier
August	Kati Nescher	Josh Olins
September	Marie Piovesan; Daria Strokous; Tian Yi; Xiao Wen Ju; Liu Wen; Lindsey Wixson	Inez & Vinoodh
October	Li Bingbing	Chen Man
November	Natasha Poly	Willy Vanderperre
December	Karlie Kloss	Sølve Sundsbø

=== 2013 ===
Issue	Cover model	Photographer
January	Zhou Xun	Karl Lagerfeld
February	Constance Jablonski	Patrick Demarchelier
March	Arizona Muse	Inez & Vinoodh
April	Fei Fei Sun	Willy Vanderperre
May	Maggie Cheung	Sølve Sundsbø
June	Cara Delevingne	Patrick Demarchelier
July	Zhang Ziyi	Patrick Demarchelier
August	Victoria Beckham	Josh Olins
September	Daria Strokous; Doutzen Kroes; Fei Fei Sun; Kati Nescher; Liu Wen; Sasha Pivovarova; Sui He; Xiao Wen Ju	Inez & Vinoodh
October	Li Bingbing	Chen Man
November	Mariacarla Boscono	Willy Vanderperre
December	Shu Qi	Mario Testino

=== 2014 ===
Issue	Cover model	Photographer
January	Natasha Poly	Patrick Demarchelier
February	Iselin Steiro	Sølve Sundsbø
March	Xiao Wen Ju; Tian Yi; Cici Xiang	Mario Testino
April	Edita Vilkevičiūtė	Daniel Jackson
May	Fei Fei Sun	Sharif Hamza
June	Faye Wong	Emma Summerton
July	Kati Nescher	Mikael Jansson
August	Arizona Muse	Patrick Demarchelier
September	Fan Bingbing	Patrick Demarchelier
October	Anna Ewers	Craig McDean
November	Liu Wen	David Sims
December	Fei Fei Sun; Xiao Wen Ju	Tim Walker

=== 2015 ===
Issue	Cover model	Photographer
January	Shu Qi	Chen Man
February	Du Juan	Daniel Jackson
March	Gisele Bündchen	Mario Testino
April	Freja Beha Erichsen	Craig McDean
May	Sasha Luss	Boo George
June	Sasha Pivovarova	Boo George
July	Kris Wu & Kendall Jenner	Mario Testino
August	Anna Ewers	Patrick Demarchelier
September	Liu Wen; Fan Bingbing; Zhao Wei; Carina Lau; Tang Wei; Du Juan; Chris Lee; Li Bingbing; Zhang Ziyi; Zhou Xun	Mario Testino
October	Karlie Kloss	Mario Testino
November	Yuan Bo Chao; Gia Tang; Jing Wen; Dylan Xue; Luping Wang; Xiao Wen Ju	Elaine Constantine
December	Edie Campbell	Sølve Sundsbø

=== 2016 ===
Issue	Cover model	Photographer
January	Sun Li	Chen Man
February	Sasha Pivovarova & Anja Rubik	Chen Man
March	Gigi Hadid	Sølve Sundsbø
April	Xiao Wen Ju	Ben Toms
May	Victoria Beckham	Sølve Sundsbø
June	Zhou Xun	Chen Man
July	Grace Hartzel; Fernanda Ly; Ruth Bell; Frederikke Sofie	Patrick Demarchelier
August	Chris Lee	Mark Seliger
September	Frederikke Sofie & Ruth Bell	Ryan McGinley
October	Rianne van Rompaey	Roe Ethridge
November	Shu Qi	Mario Sorrenti
December	Liu Wen; Chang Chen; Hu Ge	Terry Richardson

=== 2017 ===
Issue	Cover model	Photographer
January	Faye Wong	Mei Yuan Gui
February	Fan Bingbing	Patrick Demarchelier
March	Agnes Åkerlund; Yasmin Wijnaldum; Ruth Bell	Ben Toms
March	Fei Fei Sun; Gigi Hadid; Imaan Hammam	Patrick Demarchelier
March	Lexi Boling; Natalie Westling; Xiao Wen Ju	Roe Ethridge
March	Mica Argañaraz	Collier Schorr
April	Bella Hadid	Collier Schorr
May	Liu Wen	Terry Richardson
June	Karlie Kloss	Roe Ethridge
July	Freja Beha Erichsen	Collier Schorr
August	Emilia Clarke	Terry Richardson
September	Bella Hadid & Chu Wong	Patrick Demarchelier
September	Fei Fei Sun & Anna Ewers	Collier Schorr
October	Chen Kun & Grace Elizabeth	Nathaniel Goldberg
November	Kris Grikaite	Ben Toms
December	Edie Campbell	Patrick Demarchelier

=== 2018 ===
Issue	Cover model	Photographer
January	Cara Taylor	Roe Ethridge
February	Ziyi Zhang	Feng Hai
March	Liu Wen	Ben Toms
April	Alicia Vikander & Daniel Wu	Mark Seliger
May	He Cong & Loane Normand	Emma Summerton
May	Sara Grace Wallerstedt	Sølve Sundsbø
June	Hu Ge & Luna Bijl	Paolo Roversi
July	Amandine Renard	Camilla Åkrans
August	Marte Mei van Haaster	Dario Catellani
September	Zhou Xun	Paolo Roversi
October	Chris Lee	Petra Collins
November	Shu Qi	Paolo Roversi
December	Grace Elizabeth	Sølve Sundsbø

=== 2019 ===
Issue	Cover model	Photographer
January	Kris Grikaite	Sølve Sundsbø
February	Zhao Wei	Chen Man
March	Vittoria Ceretti	Sølve Sundsbø
April	Fei Fei Sun	Emma Summerton
May	Sasha Pivovarova; Claudia Schiffer; Grace Elizabeth	Camilla Åkrans
June	Lara Mullen	Bibi Cornejo Borthwick
July	Sophie Turner	Daniel Jackson
August	Aaron Kwok	Wing Shya
August	Chang Chen	Yu Cong
August	Hu Ge	Li QI
August	Liao Fan	Kai Z. Feng
September	Sui He; Natalia Vodianova; Du Juan	Sølve Sundsbø
October	Xiao Wen Ju	Chen Man
November	Luna Bijl	Yelena Yemchuk
December	Freja Beha Erichsen	Yu Cong

== 2020s ==
=== 2020 ===
Issue	Cover model	Photographer
January	Zhou Xun; Liu Wen; Hu Ge; Chris Lee; Jackson Yee	Alexi Lubomirski
February	Du Juan; He Cong; Pan Haowen; Lina Zhang; Tang He	Leslie Zhang
March	Chris Lee	Nick Knight
April	Liu Yifei	Kai Z. Feng
May	Cara Taylor	Camilla Åkrans
June	Billie Eilish	Nick Knight
July	Zhou Dongyu	Elizaveta Porodina
August	Natalia Vodianova	Estelle Hanania
September	Zhang Ziyi	Elizaveta Porodina
October	Shu Qi	Zhong Lin
November	Liu Wen	Carin Backoff; Emma Summerton; Fumiko Imano; Ziqian Wang; Zhang Wenxin; Xie Qi
December	Kaia Gerber	Craig McDean

=== 2021 ===
Issue	Cover model	Photographer
January	Xiao Wen Ju	Leslie Zhang
February	Kendall Jenner	Autumn de Wilde
March	He Cong	Liu Song
April	Li Bingbing	Chen Man
May	Zhou Xun	Leslie Zhang
June	Liu Yifei	Jumbo Tsui
July	Indira Scott	Steven Pan
August	Zhao Wei	YITUO
September	Fan Jinghan	Hailun Ma
October	Gong Li	Feng Hai
November	Liu Wen	Leslie Zhang
December	Karen Elson; Suzi de Givenchy; Tianna St. Louis; Tindi Mar	Lee Wei Swee

=== 2022 ===
Issue	Cover model	Photographer
January	Zhou Dongyu	Wang Ziqian
February	Du Juan	Liu Song
March	He Cong; Xu Ruoxin; Niu Yu; Ma Yanli	Nick Yang
April	Chris Lee; Duan Ni (TAO); Tao Ye (TAO)	Jumbo Tsui
May	Tang Wei	Wang Liang
June	Marion Cotillard	Paolo Roversi
July	Kendall Jenner	Inez and Vinoodh
August	Xiao Wen Ju	Leslie Zhang
September	Xie Chaoyu; Sherry Shi; Mao Xiaoxing; Chu Wong; Qun Ye	Sølve Sundsbø
October	Michelle Yeoh	Agnes Lloyd-Platt
November	Li Bingbing	Hailun Ma
December	Liu Wen	Margaret Zhang

=== 2023 ===
Issue	Cover model	Photographer
January	Fei Fei Sun	Nick Yang
February	Jackson Yee	LiCha
March	Zhou Xun	Jumbo Tsui
April	Shu Pei Qin	Hans Neumann
May	Fan Jinghan	Hailun Ma
June	Zhou Dongyu	Dan Beleiu
July	Quannah Chasinghorse; Lina Zhang; Amber Valletta	Cass Bird
August	Chu Wong	Charlie Engman
September	He Cong	Leslie Zhang
October	Zhang Zifeng	Annie Lai
November	Shalom Harlow	Ned Rogers
December	Sherry Shi; Mengyao Wang; Huijia Chen; Hejia Li	Felix Cooper

=== 2024 ===
Issue	Cover model	Photographer
January	Chu Wong	Huang Jiaqi
February	Du Juan	Margaret Zhang
March	Fei Fei Sun	Zoey Grossman
April	Tang Wei	Hong Jang Hyun
May	Cate Blanchett	Szilveszter Makó
June	Liu Wen	Wing Shya
July	Zhou Xun	Zhong Lin
August	Xiao Wen Ju	Leslie Zhang
September	Liu Yifei	Yu Cong
October	Joan Chen; Carina Lau; Vivian Wu; Yan Bingyan; Zhao Tao	Trunk Xu
November	Zheng Qinwen	Wang Ziqian
December	Lina Zhang and her two sons	Hailun Ma

=== 2025 ===
Issue	Cover model	Photographer
January	Jia Ling	Leslie Zhang
February	He Cong	Trunk Xu
March	Jiahui Zhang	Liu Song
April	Liu Wen	Sean + Seng
May	Wang Yibo	Liu Song
May	Fei Fei Sun	Zhong Lin
June	Zhou Dongyu	Wing Shya
July	Adriana Lima	Wang Ziqian
August	Heija Li; Ying Ouyang; Diane Chiu; Yilan Hua	Kulesza & Pik
September	Du Juan; Fei Fei Sun; Shu Pei Qin; Xiao Wen Ju; Ming Xi; He Cong; Lina Zhang; Chu Wong	Elizaveta Porodina
September	Liu Yifei; Yang Mi; Ni Ni; Dilraba Dilmurat; Song Jia; Zhang Xiaofei; Xin Zhilei; Ma Sichun; Zhang Zifeng; Vicky Chen; Li Gengxi	Trunk Xu
October	Xin Zhilei	Wang Ziqian
November	Shu Qi	Nick Yang
December	Zheng Qinwen	Liu Song

=== 2026 ===
Issue	Cover model	Photographer
January	Yang Mi	Leslie Zhang
February	Sarah Snook	Norman Jean Roy
March	He Cong, Xiao Wen Ju	Sean + Seng
April	Tang Wei	Liu Song
May	Nicole Kidman	Sean Thomas
June	Song Hye-kyo	Hong Jang Hyun
June	Eileen Gu	Nick Yang
July	Michelle Yeoh	Theo Liu
August	Dilraba Dilmurat	Fan Xin
September	Anne Hathaway	Norman Jean Roy
October	Fei Fei Sun	Nadine Ijewere
November	Jisoo	Leslie Zhang

== See also ==
- List of L'Officiel China cover models
