= Spring 2009 Chanel couture collection =

The Spring 2009 Chanel couture collection was presented on January 26, 2009 in Paris.

== Context ==
Though the spring couture season took place amidst a financial crisis, the couture shows appeared generally unaffected by the economic downturn. In the words of fashion journalist Cathy Horyn, "The economic crisis doesn't really scare the people who still practice haute couture, that small, vanishing world of embroiderers, dyers and feathermakers who serve the imagination of the few remaining couturiers." The market for couture clothing is very small, however, with only a few hundred customers worldwide; the most popular pieces in any collection generally selling “no more than three per continent.” Couture is generally unaffected by recessions because of their ultra-wealthy clientele.

In 2008, Chanel saw growth in all sales divisions. In particular, couture sales experienced a 20% increase, with much of this grown coming from emerging markets like China, Russia, and the Middle East. About one month before its couture show, however, Chanel laid off 200 temporary workers out of a total work force of 16,000. Because French luxury houses are viewed as impervious to economic downturns, the announcement shocked the press. Despite the economic crisis, Chanel's fashion president Bruno Pavlovsky told the Sunday Times that “good sales worldwide” were expected. Karl Lagerfeld, Chanel's creative director, commented that the economy affected “only … the conversation”.

== References and inspiration ==
"The idea was a white page," Lagerfeld said of the collection. He also commented that the show was a “refined purge” reflecting the “new modesty” in fashion. After the excesses of the bubble years preceding the economic crisis, and Chanel's own over-the-top Russian-inspired show in December 2008, Lagerfeld concluded that “housecleaning was needed”. Lagerfeld commented elsewhere that the show's basic silhouette was inspired by pop-up books.

The show continued in the tradition of Coco Chanel's use of white. Coco Chanel often wore white, and in 1933 presented an all-white collection.

== Collection ==
The collection consisted of all-white clothing. The clothing was typically cut in an A-line shape, with "cropped jackets with flat, squared-off shoulders and standaway collars."

During the runway show, models wore paper headdresses designed by Tokyo hairstylist and milliner Katsuya Kamo. The sixty-five headdresses were created from two packets of 11x17 photocopy paper, crumpled and twisted to achieve the desired effect. Most were sent from Tokyo, though some were constructed in Paris. Kamo and six or seven assistants "worked part-time for up to three weeks making the flowers."

== Fashion show ==
The fashion show was held in a former bank near the Chanel headquarters on rue Cambon, rather than the Grand Palais exhibition hall where the event is typically held. The intimate location, near to Coco Chanel's previous residence at number 31, “emphasised the mythology of the fashion house.”

Rather than the “single-prop, mega-installations” employed in recent years, the set was a “glorious paper heaven” designed by Stephane Lubrina. The building's grand stairway and 32 doric columns were covered from with 6,700 enormous white paper flowers. The set took 40 workers 15 weeks to create.

Audience members were seated at round tables near the catwalk; these tables were adorned with paper flower centerpieces and white “lace” tablecloths cut from paper. Guests included Keira Knightley, Marianne Faithfull, and Olga Kurylenko.

=== Models ===
Freja Beha Erichsen opened and closed the fashion show. The remaining models were:

- Sigrid Agren
- Natalia Belova
- Inguna Butane
- Charlotte di Calypso
- Tereza Cervenova
- Lily Donaldson
- Jourdan Dunn
- Denisa Dvorakova
- Tanya Dziahileva
- Lindsay Ellingson
- Kamila Filipcikova
- Magdalena Frackowiak
- Luca Gadjus
- Daniela de Jesus
- Angelika Kocheva
- Alina Kozelkova
- Anouck Lepère
- Tatiana Lyadochkina
- Elena Melnik
- Jennifer Messelier
- Heidi Mount
- Karmen Pedaru
- Pinkie
- Sasha Pivovarova
- Shu Pei Qin
- Kori Richardson
- Vlada Roslyakova
- Amanda S.
- Myf Shepherd
- Iekeliene Stange
- Skye Stracke
- Elsa Sylvan
- Siri Tollerød
- Alexandra Tomlinson
- Edita Vilkeviciute
- Liu Wen
- Queeny van der Zande

== Reception ==
The New York Times' Cathy Horyn called the show a "rare pleasure", praising "Lagerfeld's supreme ability to concentrate on a single idea and find endless ways to express it". Sarah Mower of Style.com called the collection an "uplifting rite of spring, perfectly pitched between graphic modernism, ravishing romance, and astonishingly innovative detail."
