= Xiao Wen Ju =

Chinese model (born 1989)

- Jū Xiǎowén / 雎晓雯
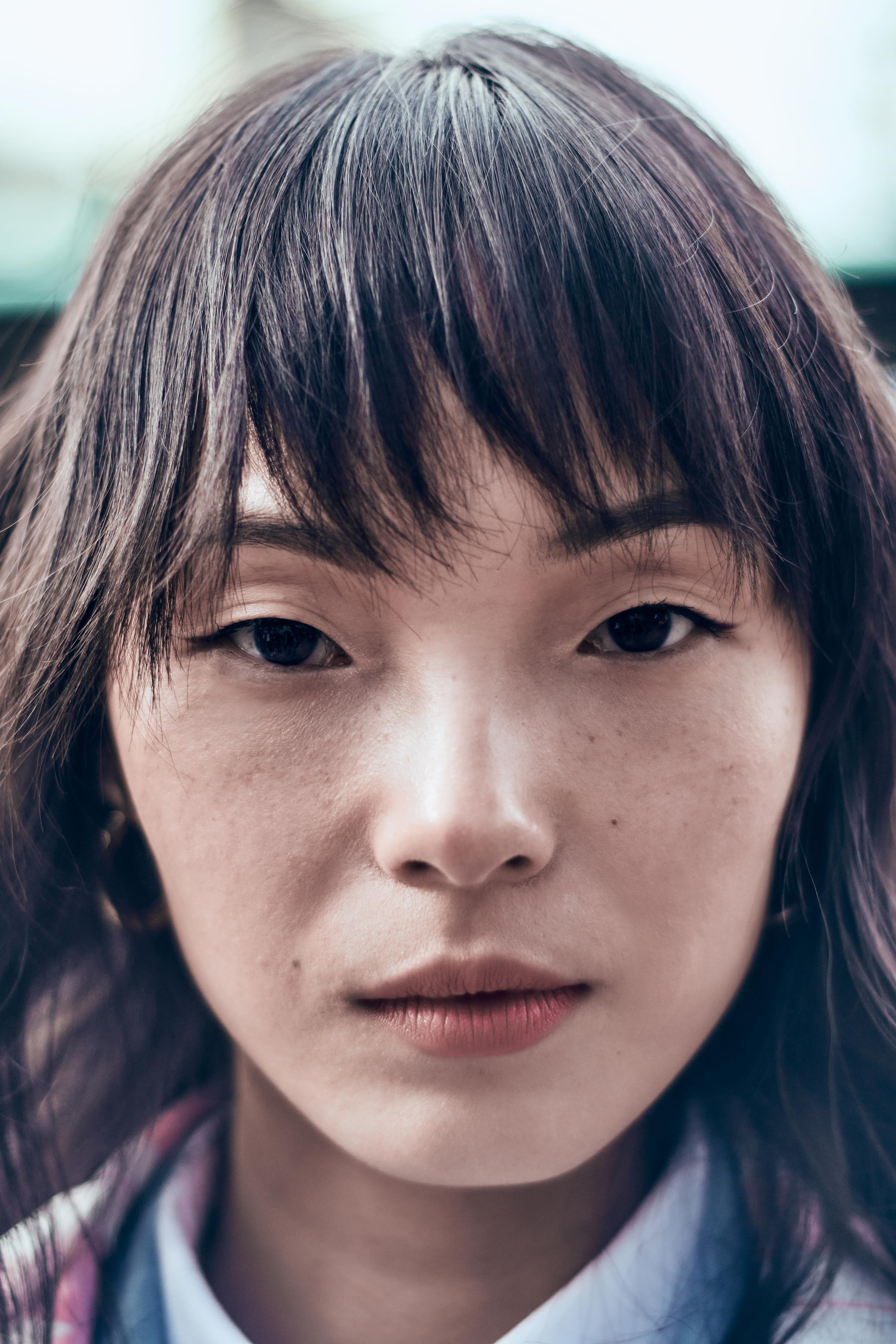
- Xiao Wen Ju in September 2018
- Born: 19 May 1989 (age 36); Xi'an, Shaanxi province, China
- Occupation: Model
- Years active: 2010–present
- Spouse: Jin Dachuan
- Modeling information
- Height: 1.77 m (5 ft 9 1/2 in)
- Hair color: Black
- Eye color: Brown
- Agency: IMG Models (New York, Paris, Milan, London, Sydney)

Xiao Wen Ju (simplified Chinese: 雎晓雯; traditional Chinese: 雎曉雯; pinyin: Jū Xiǎowén; born 19 May 1989) is a Chinese model. She was the first model of Chinese descent to be the face of Marc Jacobs.

== Early life ==
Xiao Wen Ju was born on May 19, 1989, in the city of Xi'an in Shaanxi province. She began her modeling career in China in 2010, signing with IMG Models.

== Career ==
After gaining attention with her appearance on the cover of Harper's Bazaar China May 2010, which focused on Chinese models, Ju debuted in New York City at the Honor Fall 2011 show. During the New York Fashion Week Fall/Winter 2011 she also walked for DKNY, Prada and L.A.M.B. by Gwen Stefani during which she fell after the platform of her right shoe broke mid-walk. During the next 2011 fashion seasons she walked for Shiatzy Chen, 3.1 Phillip Lim, Calvin Klein Jeans, DKNY, Emanuel Ungaro, Hermès, Louis Vuitton, Prada, Rochas and Thierry Mugler among others. In addition she was picked to be on Lane Crawford's Fall/Winter 2011 campaign, along with other top Chinese models like Ming Xi and Shu Pei.

In 2012 she has walked for 3.1 Phillip Lim, DKNY, DSquared², Hermès, Jill Stuart, Jonathan Saunders, Louis Vuitton, Marc Jacobs, Moschino Cheap & Chic and Tory Burch. She has done ad campaigns for Adidas, Dior, Kenzo, Lane Crawford and Marc Jacobs (becoming the first Chinese model to front the designer's campaign). She has also appeared on the cover of Vogue China and Numero China (twice). At Tibi's Fall/Winter 2012 show she mistakenly walked down the runway in the wrong direction. In 2015 she appeared on the cover of Vogue Italia.

As of July 2012 she was ranked number 22 on Models.com's Top 50 female models list.

In 2015 she was placed as number 6 in Arogundade's top ten Asian models list. In 2016 she became the new face of L'Oréal.

She walked in the Victoria's Secret Fashion Show 2016 in Paris, becoming only fifth Chinese model to do so after Liu Wen, Sui He, Shu Pei, and Ming Xi. She walked again at the Victoria's Secret Fashion Show 2017 in Shanghai.

As of 2017, she was inducted into Models.com's list of "Industry Icons".

In 2018, Ju was featured in a show called Model Diaries where her trip to Dubai was documented by Etihad Airways as it shows its support for the global fashion industry.
