= Bom Retiro =

Bom Retiro (literally meaning "good retreat") may refer to:

- Bom Retiro, São Paulo, a district of São Paulo, Brazil
- Bom Retiro, Santa Catarina, a Brazilian city in the state Santa Catarina
- Bom Retiro do Sul, a municipality Rio Grande do Sul, Brazil
- Bom Retiro River, Brazil
