= Rocco Liu =

Chinese journalist (born 1983)

Rocco Liu (Chinese: 刘冲; born 1983) also known as Liu Chong, is a Chinese journalist and fashion editor who served as the editorial director (editor-in-chief) GQ China from 2020 until 2024 and editorial director of Vogue China since 2024.

== Early life ==
Bonnier was born in 1983 in China. Liu studied at for a bachelor's in English language and literature at the Beijing Foreign Studies University.

== Career ==
Liu joined GQ China in 2009 as copyright editor. In 2017, he began to lead GQ's digital direction. In 2020, Liu was appointed acting editorial director of Chinese GQ, then officially promoted to the role in July 2021.

In 2024, Liu was appointed to the position of editorial director at Vogue China.

Media offices
Preceded by Margaret Zhang	Editorial Director of Vogue China; 2024–present	Succeeded by current
