= Ming Xi =

Chinese model

- 奚梦瑶
- Xi in 2026
- Born: Xi Mengyao; Shanghai, China
- Spouse: Mario Ho (m. 2019)
- Children: 2
- Modeling information
- Height: 5 ft 10 in (1.78 m)
- Hair color: Black
- Eye color: Brown
- Agency: The Lions (New York); Elite Model Management (Paris, Milan, Barcelona, Copenhagen, Toronto); Storm Model Management (London); Model Management (Hamburg); Munich Models (Munich); MP Stockholm (Stockholm)

Ming Xi or Xi Mengyao (simplified Chinese: 奚梦瑶; traditional Chinese: 奚夢瑤; pinyin: Xī Mèngyáo) is a Chinese model. Her professional modeling career started in 2009 after she attended a TV competition. Her international modeling career began in 2011 when she debuted for the Givenchy Haute Spring Show. In the same year, she modeled the Givenchy ready-to-wear collection and appeared as the face of Givenchy's Fall/Winter publicity advertising campaign. Xi also modeled for the Victoria's Secret Fashion Show in 2013.

== Career ==
In 2008, Xi attended a television competition on Dragon Television called Go! Oriental Angels. This was her first notable appearance on television.

Two years after she graduated from college, Xi participated in the Elite Model Look competition, a fashion modeling event held by Elite Model Management. Xi ranked third in the competition. Shortly after the contest, she was offered a contract with Givenchy, and debuted at the Givenchy Haute Couture Show and ready-to-wear shows. She started her international modeling career shortly after in the same year, when she appeared in the Givenchy F/W 2010 campaign, shot by Mert Alas and Marcus Piggott. Xi also took part in the Fall/ Winter 2011 New York Fashion Week with other three Chinese fashion models: Shu Pei, Sun Feifei, and Liu Wen.

Xi modeled the Victoria's Secret Fashion Show in 2013, 2014, 2015, 2016, 2017 and 2018. In 2014, Michael Kors invited Xi to model his Michael Kors Shanghai Extravaganza with Rosie Huntington-Whiteley and Miranda Kerr. Xi also participated in the Met Gala red carpet with Kors and Huntington-Whiteley. In 2015, Olivier Rousteing, creative director of Balmain, invited Xi to model the Balmain 2015 Fall runway along with Alessandra Ambrosio, Adriana Lima, Constance Jablonski, Taylor Hill, Joan Smalls, Cindy Bruna, Jourdan Dunn, Karlie Kloss, Magdalena Frąckowiak, Devon Windsor, and Lily Donaldson. In 2015, Karl Lagerfeld selected Xi to star in a new campaign for his label, and cooperated with Kendall Jenner and Sasha Luss.

In early 2019, Xi became the new face of Biotherm, specifically for the brand's Life Plankton range. Xi graced the double cover of Grazia China's 568th issue in July 2022, marking her return. In 2023, Xi was invited to shoot Louis Vuitton 2023 Chinese Valentine Day Campaign.

In March 2024, Xi was featured on the cover for Grazia China again, photographed by Chen Man. This set of covers showcases the diverse beauty of the girls.In April of the same year, Xi was featured in Sisley Paris's Spring 2024 campaign. In May 2024, Xi was invited to walk Balenciaga Resort 2025 Show in Shanghai. This is also her first major show back from maternity. Three months later, Stuart Weitzman announced Xi as one of the five new global ambassadors, along with Aly Raisman, Christy Turlington, Issa Rae, and Lucy Liu. And she also starred in Stuart Weitzman F/W 2024 Campaign. And in 2025, Xi renewed her contract with Stuart Weitzman and continued to serve as the brand's global ambassador.

In February 2025, Xi participated in Milan Fashion Week and modeled in the Fendi F/W 25 show. In August 2025, Xi was featured on the cover for Vogue China's 20th Anniversary, photographed by Elizaveta Porodina. Since her first year in the industry, 2010, Xi has had many close collaborations with Vogue. This time, as one of the most representative Chinese supermodels, she shot the magazine cover. In September 2025, Sandro Paris appointed Xi as brand face. And it released the F/W 2025 campaign with Xi.

== Personal life ==
In July 2019, Xi married Mario Ho, son of Hong Kong-Macau magnate Stanley Ho, after an engagement ceremony in May earlier in the year. She gave birth to a son named Ronaldo in October 2019. In November 2021, Xi gave birth to a daughter in Shanghai.
