= Ines Crnokrak =

Serbian model

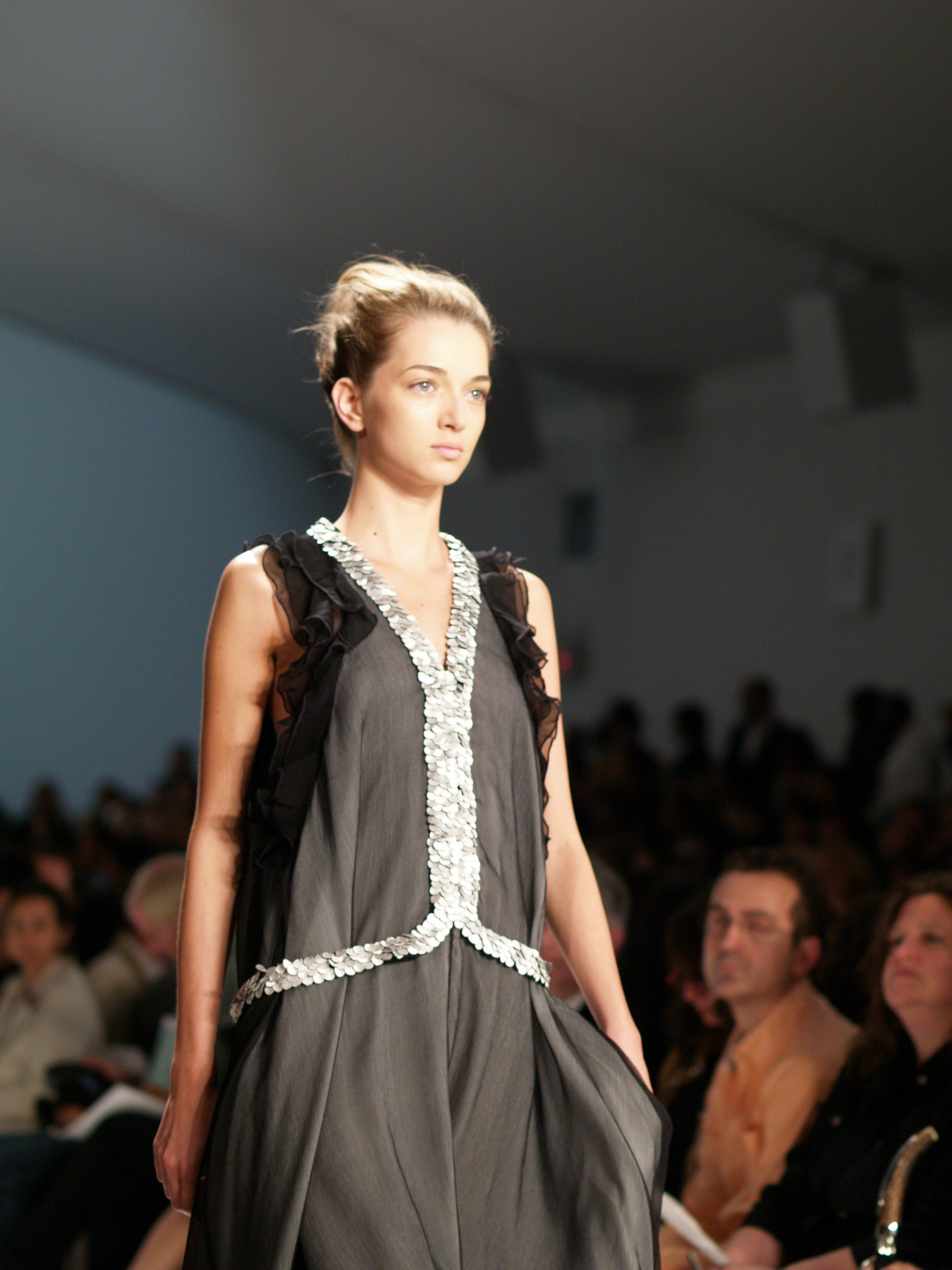
- Crnokrak walking in Doo.Ri Spring 2007 show, New York Fashion Week
- Born: Ines Crnokrak; 5 March 1984 (age 42); Belgrade, SR Serbia, SFR Yugoslavia (now Serbia)
- Occupations: Model; Author
- Years active: 2000–present
- Modeling information
- Height: 1.79 m (5 ft 10 1/2 in)
- Hair color: Light Brown

Ines Crnokrak (Serbian: Инес Црнокрак; 5 March 1984) is a Serbian model. She has been featured on covers of Numéro, Vogue Beauty, and Glamour.

== Early life ==
Crnokrak was born on 5 March 1984 in Belgrade, SR Serbia, SFR Yugoslavia. Her father was a model as a young girl, when she was six years old she began doing local work in her city, she took part in children's fashion shows and editorials.

== Career ==
Ines Crnokrak began her professional modeling career in the early 2000s at just sixteen years old. She received an invitation to Paris, France to model in the high fashion world, then another invitation to Japan. Her career would skyrocket in 2005 where she would take place in fashion shows for Celine, Dior, Moschino, and many more.

=== Runway ===
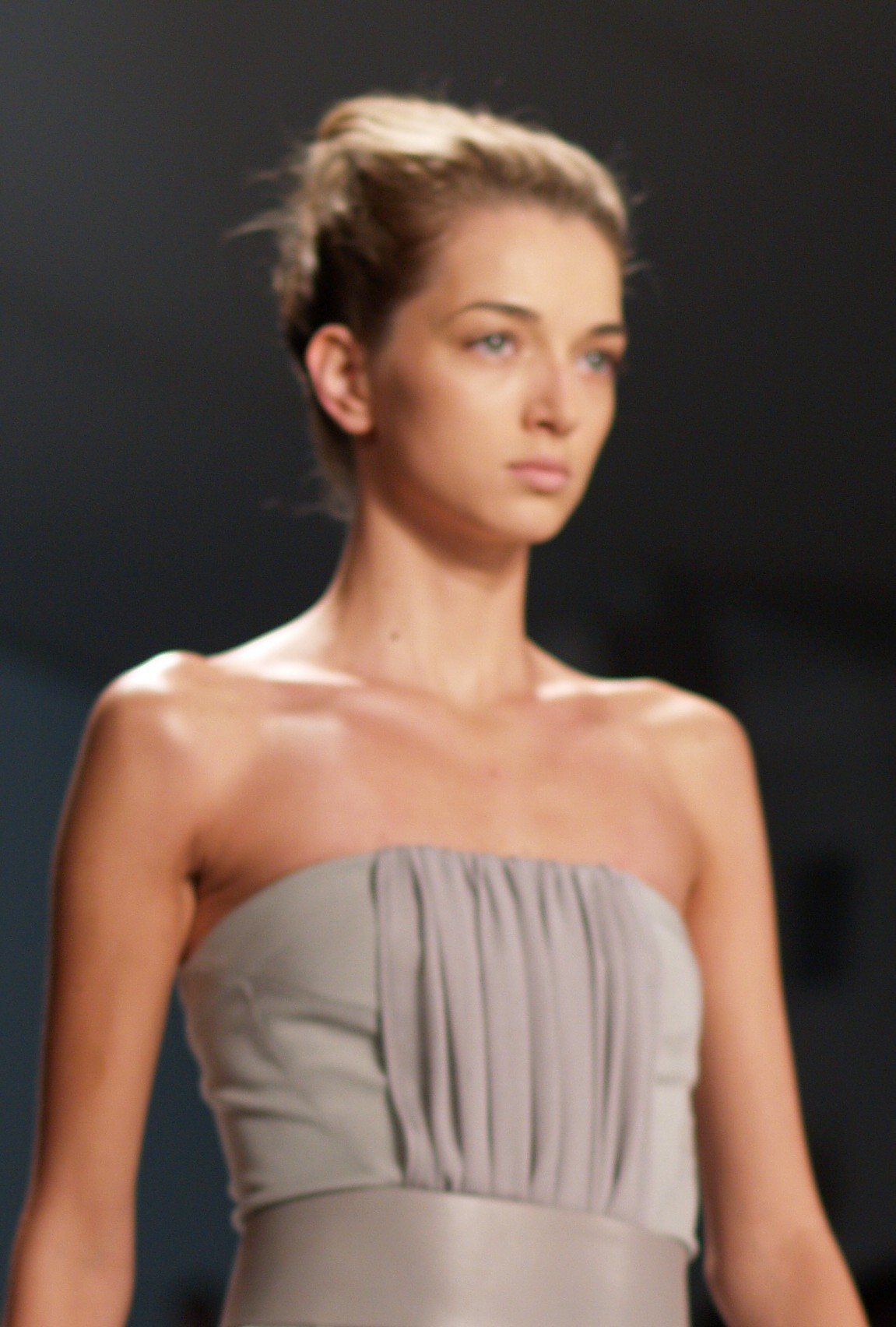
Crnokrak walking a fashion show

Her runway credits include, Marc Jacobs, Christian Dior, Just Cavalli, Celine, D&G, Dolce & Gabbana, Ralph Lauren, Rochas, Alberta Ferretti, Betsey Johnson, Oscar de la Renta, Vivienne Westwood, Yves Saint Laurent, Moschino, Rocco Barocco, Banana Republic, Alexandre Herchcovitch, Emanuel Ungaro, Sonia Rykiel, Colcci, Kenzo, and many more.

=== Advertising campaigns ===
Crnokrak was in the Dolce & Gabbana Fall/Winter 2006 campaign that was photographed by Steven Meisel.

Ines has been in advertising campaigns for, Dolce & Gabbana, Frankie Morello, Stuart Weitzman, and many more.

She has been photographed for magazine editorials for, Vogue, Elle, Numero, Amica, Tatler, Vanity Fair, Dazed and Confused, Harper’s Bazaar.

Crnokrak has also appeared in look-books for Marc Jacobs.

== Personal life ==
Ines has a podcast called the 'Fashion Host Podcast' alongside model Vlada Roslyakova.

Crnokrak has a book called, 'Do You Want To be A Model?'

She currently lives in New York City and is fluent in Serbian and English.
