= Sherry Shi =

American fashion model

- Born: Sherry Ramsay Shi; 26 February 2002 (age 24); Houston, Texas, U.S.
- Occupation: Model
- Modelling information
- Height: 5 ft 11 in (1.80 m)
- Hair colour: Black
- Eye colour: Dark brown
- Agency: IMG Models

Sherry Ramsay Shi (born 26 February 2002) is an American fashion model signed with IMG Models. She has appeared on the cover of the June 2024 issue of Harper's Bazaar and has walked in the Victoria's Secret Fashion Show 2025. She is known for walking the highest number of shows of any model during the Fall/Winter 2022 fashion week season.

== Career ==
=== Early career ===
Shi began modeling professionally at age 16 and made her runway debut at New York Fashion Week for Alexander Wang's Spring 2019 collection. She spent several years developing her runway technique, drawing inspiration from models including Mariacarla Boscono, Natasha Poly, Vittoria Ceretti, and Kaia Gerber.

In 2021, Shi appeared in a Vogue-produced video alongside Bad Bunny and a group of models performing to the Macarena.

=== Breakthrough (2021–2022) ===
In 2021, Shi appeared on the cover of American Vogue's September issue alongside Bella Hadid and Precious Lee.

During the Fall/Winter 2022 fashion week season, Shi walked 39 shows — more than any other model that season — for houses including Chanel, Schiaparelli, Jil Sander, and Saint Laurent. She also attended the 2022 CFDA Fashion Awards. Later that year, she appeared on multiple covers of Vogue Hong Kong and Vogue China.

=== 2023–present ===
Shi continued an active runway schedule in the 2023 and 2024 seasons, walking for brands including Dior, Max Mara, Missoni, Moschino, Tory Burch, and Acne Studios. As of 2024, she has walked in nearly 200 fashion shows worldwide.

In 2024, Shi covered the May issue of Vogue España and the June issue of Harper's Bazaar Singapore, the latter shot in Paris. She has also fronted advertising campaigns for Dior, Missoni, and Michael Kors.

In October 2025, Shi walked in the Victoria's Secret Fashion Show 2025 in New York City, alongside models including Bella Hadid, Gigi Hadid, Adriana Lima, and Candice Swanepoel.
