= Jin Dachuan =

Chinese model (born 1993)

金大川
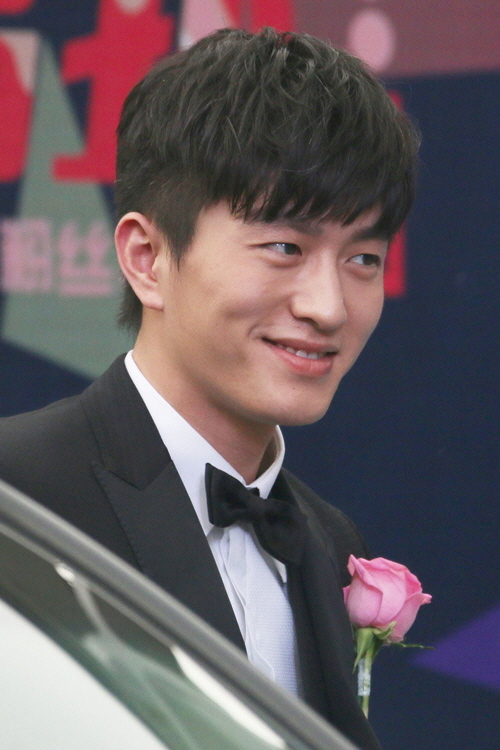
- Jin Dachuan
- Born: April 16, 1993 (age 33); Tai'an, Shandong, China
- Spouse: Ju Xiaowen
- Modeling information
- Height: 1.89 m (6 ft 2 1/2 in)
- Hair color: black
- Eye color: brown

Jin Dachuan (Simplified Chinese: 金大川; born 16 April 1993) is a male model from China.

== Career ==
He In 2010, he participated in the 16th China Model Star (Simplified Chinese: 中国模特之星) Contest and won third place and started as a fashion model in China. In 2011, he was admitted to the Beijing Institute of Fashion Technology. In June 2013, Miuccia Prada personally selected Jin Dachuan to participate in Prada's Spring/Summer 2014 fashion show during Milan Men's Fashion Week. In January 2014, he continued to participate in the Milan Autumn/Winter Fashion Week, and also joined the runway shows for 16 different brands including Bottega Veneta and Jil Sander.

== Personal life ==
In 2023, he married Ju Xiaowen. They have one daughter.
