= Sasha Pivovarova =

Russian supermodel (born 1985)

- Саша Пивоварова
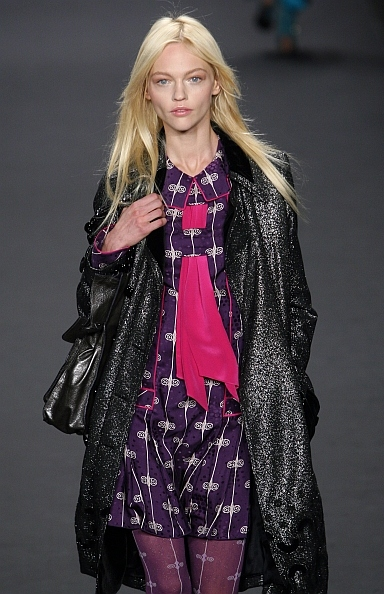
- Pivovarova on the runway for Anna Sui, Fall 2009 at New York Fashion Week
- Born: Aleksandra Igorevna Pivovarova; 21 January 1985 (age 41); Moscow, Russian SFSR, Soviet Union (now Russia)
- Occupation: Model
- Spouse: Igor Vishnyakov (m. 2008)
- Children: 2
- Modeling information
- Height: 1.75 m (5 ft 9 in)
- Hair color: Blonde
- Eye color: Blue
- Agency: IMG Models (New York, Paris, Milan, London, Sydney); UNIQUE DENMARK (Copenhagen)

Aleksandra ''Sasha'' Igorevna Pivovarova (Russian: Александра Игоревна Пивоварова; born 21 January 1985) is a Russian model and artist. She is best known as the longest appearing fashion model for Prada, posed for 19 advertisement campaigns, a record Pivovarova has set for the brand. Pivovarova has appeared on the cover of Vogue 62 times. She was part of the original "Wide eyed doll era" in the late 2000s.

== Career ==
=== Early career 2005-2007 ===
As an art history student at the Russian State University for the Humanities, Pivovarova never dreamed of becoming a model until her friend and future husband, photographer Igor Vishnyakov, took photos of her in 2005 and presented them to the international modeling agency IMG. Pivovarova rose to prominence when she got the attention of Miuccia Prada in 2005 and opened the F/W 2005 Prada show. In the same year she appeared on the cover of Vogue Italia photographed by Steven Meisel for the April's issue. She then became the face of Prada for 6 consecutive seasons. In the F/W 05 season she walked 69 shows.

=== Rise to prominence 2008-present ===
Pivovarova has appeared in advertisements for GIADA, Prada, Chanel, Balenciaga, Dior Beauty, Miu Miu, Yves Saint Laurent, Mulberry, Chloé, Jimmy Choo, Max Mara, Hugo Boss, Giorgio Armani, Michael Kors, Lanvin, Juicy Couture, Etro, Frame Denim, H&M, Alberta Ferretti, Dsquared2, Massimo Dutti, Toteme, Shiseido, Pringle of Scotland, Paul & Joe, Longchamp, John Galliano, Biotherm, Kenzo, Thomas Wylde, Paco Rabanne Fragrance, Moncler, PHI, Olay, Mango.

In the May 2007 issue of American Vogue she was featured on the cover with Doutzen Kroes, Caroline Trentini, Raquel Zimmermann, Jessica Stam, Agyness Deyn, Coco Rocha, Hilary Rhoda, Chanel Iman, and Lily Donaldson as one of the "World's Next Top Models". In her interview, she talked about her love for art and reading.

Pivovarova appeared in the 2008 Pirelli Calendar. Spain's Marie Claire awards 'Prix de la Moda' awarded Pivovarova as "Prix International Best Model" on 20 November 2008. In December 2009, she became the face of Giorgio Armani and Mert Alas and Marcus Piggott photograph Pivovarova for Longchamp, alongside Kate Moss.

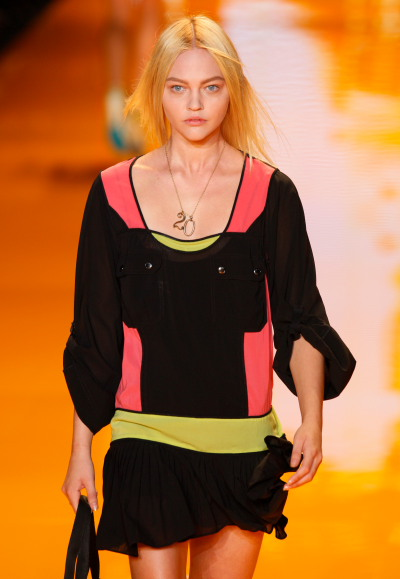
Sasha Pivovarova modeling DKNY by Donna Karan

In May 2008, she opened the spring show for Chanel couture in Paris. In July 2008, she closed the fall show for Chanel couture in Paris and walked for Jean Paul Gaultier couture. In September, she opened the show for Rag & Bone, Rodarte, and Pringle of Scotland in Milan and New York. In October, she posed for the inaugural cover of Numéro Korea. In January 2009, she walked the Christian Dior, Chanel, Elie Saab, and Valentino couture shows in Paris. In February 2009, she opened the shows for Shiatzy Chen, Miss Sixty, Rodarte, and MaxMara shows in New York and Milan; closed the fall PHI, MaxMara, and Pringle of Scotland shows.

In early 2009, Pivovarova was ranked second on the Models.com Top 50 Models Women list, sharing the spot with Natasha Poly, but moved to number four on that list by March 2011. Since 2013, she is listed on the "Industry Icons" list. Vogue Paris declared her one of the top 30 models of the decade.

Pivovarova made her acting debut in the 2011 science fiction thriller In Time, opposite Justin Timberlake and Amanda Seyfried. She played Clara, the 130-year-old mother-in-law of Vincent Kartheiser's character, Philip Weis, who is 90 years old.

Her agencies are IMG Models in New York City and Donna Models in Tokyo. Took her own self-portrait for the new Rag & Bone Do-It-Yourself ad campaign spring 2011 along with models Abbey Lee Kershaw and Lily Aldridge.

She was also booked for the Balenciaga S/S 15 campaign which was shot by Steven Meisel. In 2016, shot by photographer Steven Meisel, Pivovraova returned as the model for Prada's 2016 Spring/Summer campaign along with Natalia Vodianova and Dutch newcomer Yasmin Wijnaldum, as well as the Max Mara 2016 Spring/Summer campaign. Pivovarova appeared on the cover of Vogue China's February edition along with Anja Rubik. Pivovarova was on the cover of Vogue Italia for their June 2016 edition photographed by Mario Sorrenti, she then appeared in the AD Campaign for Prada's Pre-Fall 2016 collection.

In 2021 and 2022 she appeared on the cover of Vogue Italia.

=== Art career ===
In March 2007 a collection of Pivovarova's work including the portraits of Vlada Roslyakova and Snejana Onopka were displayed in Paris. She had her second exhibit in the New York city in 2008.

Her drawings have been featured on Vogue, Vogue Paris and Teen Vogue. Miuccia Prada and Karl Lagerfeld have commissioned Sasha to create illustrated books for them.

== Personal life ==
Born in Moscow, Pivovarova now lives in New York, where her home doubles as an art studio. Pivovarova said in a Teen Vogue interview, "I was playing with pencils while the other girls were playing with dolls." In her free time, Pivovarova paints and draws. Her paintings have been displayed in a gallery in Paris, Mansion Grand in New York, and have been published in French Vogue. She said in an interview with CNN that she uses anything as a canvas: hotel papers, casting and itinerary papers—anything she can find. She created a sleepwear collection inspired by fairy tales for Gap which launched on 1 December 2011.

Pivovarova is married to photographer Igor Vishnyakov. They married in Thailand and recreated the scene for a photo shoot in the June 2009 edition of American Vogue with close family and friends, including Jessica Stam and Irina Kulikova. Pivovarova and Vishnyakov have two daughters.

Pivovarova posted a picture of Ukrainian flag on Instagram on 24 February 2022, the day the Russian invasion of Ukraine took place.
