= He Cong =

Chinese model

- Born: 5 November 1995 (age 30); Changsha, Hunan, China
- Modeling information
- Height: 5 ft 10.5 in (179 cm)
- Hair color: Black
- Eye color: Brown
- Agency: IMG Models (worldwide)

He Cong (simplified Chinese: 贺聪; traditional Chinese: 賀聰; pinyin: Hè Cōng; born November 5, 1995) is a Chinese fashion model. She has starred in campaigns for Burberry, Coach, Fendi, Bulgari, Prada, Chanel, Stella McCartney, Dior Beauty and Guerlain, and has appeared on the covers of international editions of Vogue, V Magazine, T Magazine China, Harper’s Bazaar China, Elle China, Wallpaper China and Marie Claire China.

== Early Life ==
She was born in Changsha, Hunan. She studied fashion and design at Donghua University.

== Career ==
In 2013, He made her runway debut at a Valentino show in Shanghai as a college freshman.

In 2015, He debuted at Paris Fashion Week, walking for a dozen top brands like Chanel and Dior.

He walked over 40 runway shows for the Fall/Winter 2016 shows and was listed as Models.com’s "Top Newcomers". She scored campaigns with Dolce & Gabbana and Fenty x Puma. She fronted the cover of L’Officiel Malaysia. She was listed in Models.com's "The Hot List".

In 2017, He was featured in Coach campaigns. She appeared on the cover of the January issue of Elle China.

In 2018, He fronted the campaigns for Ermanno Scervino Stella McCartney, Trussardi, and Prabal Gurung. She appeared on the cover of the May issue of Vogue China. She was listed in Models.com's "Top 50 models".

In 2019, He appeared on the covers of the March issue of Harper's Bazaar China and Marie Claire China. She appeared in Burberry Fall campaign.

In 2020, He appeared on the covers of Vogue Hong Kong, Vogue Singapore, and V Magazine. She appeared in Chanel Fall campaign.

In 2021, He appeared on the covers of the March issue of Vogue Japan and Vogue China. She appeared in the campaigns for Bulgari, Fendi, and Ralph Lauren. She was listed in Models.com's "Industry Icons".

In 2022, He appeared on the covers of Vogue Germany and W Magazine. She appeared in the campaign for Givenchy. She attended the Met Gala for the first time.

In 2023, He appeared in the campaigns for Louis Vuitton, Tom Ford, and Ports.

In 2024, He appeared in the campaigns for Hermès, Max Mara, and Giorgio Armani. She appeared on the cover of the April issue of Harper's Bazaar Italia. She walked for the Victoria's Secret Fashion Show after the event returned from a six-year hiatus.
