= Toteme =

Swedish fashion brand

Elin Kling is the creative director of TOTEME

TOTEME is a Swedish fashion brand founded in 2014 by Elin Kling and Karl Lindman. Its headquarters are on Engelbrektsgatan in Stockholm, Sweden.

Kling is the creative director. Lindman designed TOTEME's logo and took charge of developing the brand's visual identity, overseeing TOTEME's brand positioning and the development of stores.

In 2016, the couple relocated the company from New York City to Stockholm where in 2019 they opened the first TOTEME flagship store. Further flagships followed, opening in New York in 2022, in London in 2023, and in Los Angeles in 2024. The brand is carried by Neiman Marcus, Saks Fifth Avenue, Bloomingdales, Bergdorf Goodman and Mitchells Stores.

In 2024, TOTEME had its first fashion show in Paris and its first presentation at New York Fashion Week.

== Retail locations ==
- China (Beijing, Shanghai Réel, Hangzhou, Chengdu, Shenzhen)
- Denmark (Copenhagen Vognmagergade)
- France (Paris Flagship, Paris Galeries Lafayette)
- Japan (Isetan Shinjuku, Hankyu).
- Korea (Galleria EAST, The Hyundai Seoul, The Hyundai Apgujeong Main, The Hyundai Pangyo, The Hyundai Trade Center, Shinsegae Main, Shinsegae Daejeon)
- Sweden (Stockholm Flagship, Stockholm NK Women, Stockholm NK Accessories)
- United Kingdom (London Flagship, London Sloane Street)
- United States NYC Flagship, NYC Madison Avenue, LA Flagship, LA Palisades, Aspen East Hopkins, Miami Bal Harbour)

== Clientele ==
TOTEME has dressed Crown Princess Victoria of the Swedish royal family.
