= Elin Kling =

Swedish fashion journalist (born 1983)

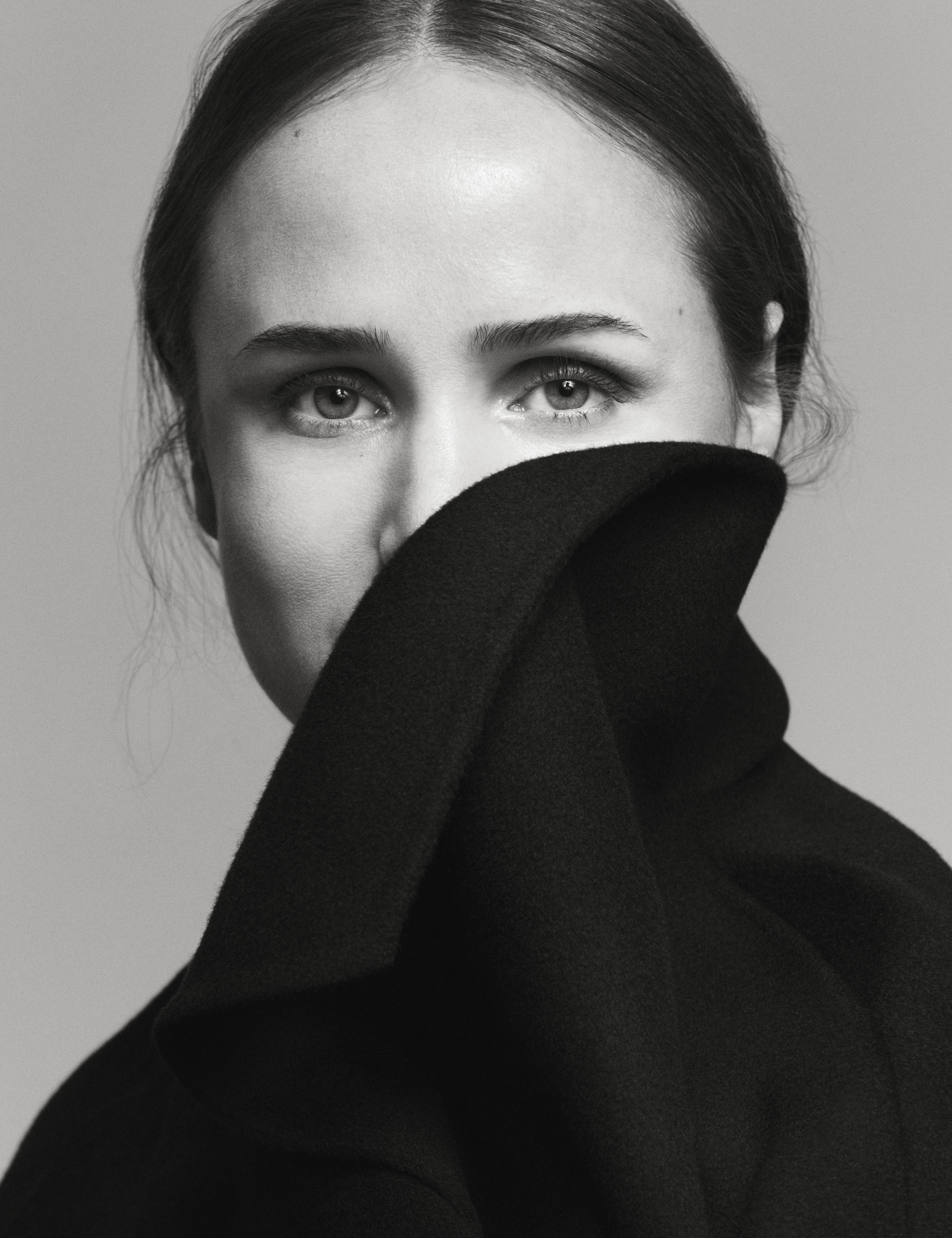
- Born: 17 February 1983 (age 43)
- Occupations: co-founder and creative director of TOTEME

Elin Kling (born 17 February 1983, in Mariestad) is a Swedish fashion journalist, co-founder and creative director of clothing brand TOTEME.

== Career ==
Born and raised in Sweden, growing up her taste was heavily influenced by the Swedish affinity for design, which combines expert craftsmanship and practicality with attention to detail. She began her career in fashion communication and publishing, in the process building a highly engaged following for her curated, editorial eye.

Kling was the official stylist for the Swedish Idol series. In 2008, she participated in the TV6 celebrity game show Hål i väggen (Hold in the Wall). Kling participated as a celebrity dancer in Let's Dance 2010 which was broadcast on TV4.

In 2014, she co-founded TOTEME with Karl Lindman in New York; they married the same year. Her vision for TOTEME was to create a brand for women that honored her uncompromising style, with rigorous collections that transcended seasonal trends and communicated a sense of realness. TOTEME has dressed Crown Princess Victoria of the Swedish royal family.

In 2016, the couple relocated the company to Stockholm where in 2019 they opened the first TOTEME flagship store. Further flagships followed, opening in New York in 2022, in London in 2023, and in Los Angeles in 2024.

== Personal life ==
Kling grew up on a farm in Mariestad, Sweden. She later moved to Stockholm where she began her career as a fashion journalist and blogger.

Kling married Karl Lindman in 2014. The two founded clothing line TOTEME together the same year in New York.

== See also ==
- Let's Dance 2010
