= Katsuya Kamo =

Japanese artist (1966–2020)

Katsuya Kamo (Japanese: かつや かも) was a milliner, hairstylist, and artist born in Fukuoka, Japan, in 1966, widely considered one of the most influential hairdressers of the turn of the century.

After training as a hairstylist, Kamo spent time in Paris assisting the Japanese stylist Tetsuya Tamura. After spending two years in Paris, he returned to Tokyo in 1995. Around this time, he became acquainted with Jun Takahashi of Undercover and Junya Watanabe of Comme des Garçons. In 1996, he began collaborating on hair and makeup design for the Undercover and Comme des Garçons runway shows. He created headpieces for clients including Fendi, Chanel, Haider Ackermann, and Maison Martin Margiela for both runway shows and campaign images. He began directing hair for Chanel Haute Couture shows in 2008.

Kamo died in March 2020 at the age of 54, and is survived by a daughter named Noi. The emerging hairstylist Yumiko Hikage considers Kamo her most important reference.
