= Angelica Cheung =

Chinese fashion journalist

- 张宇
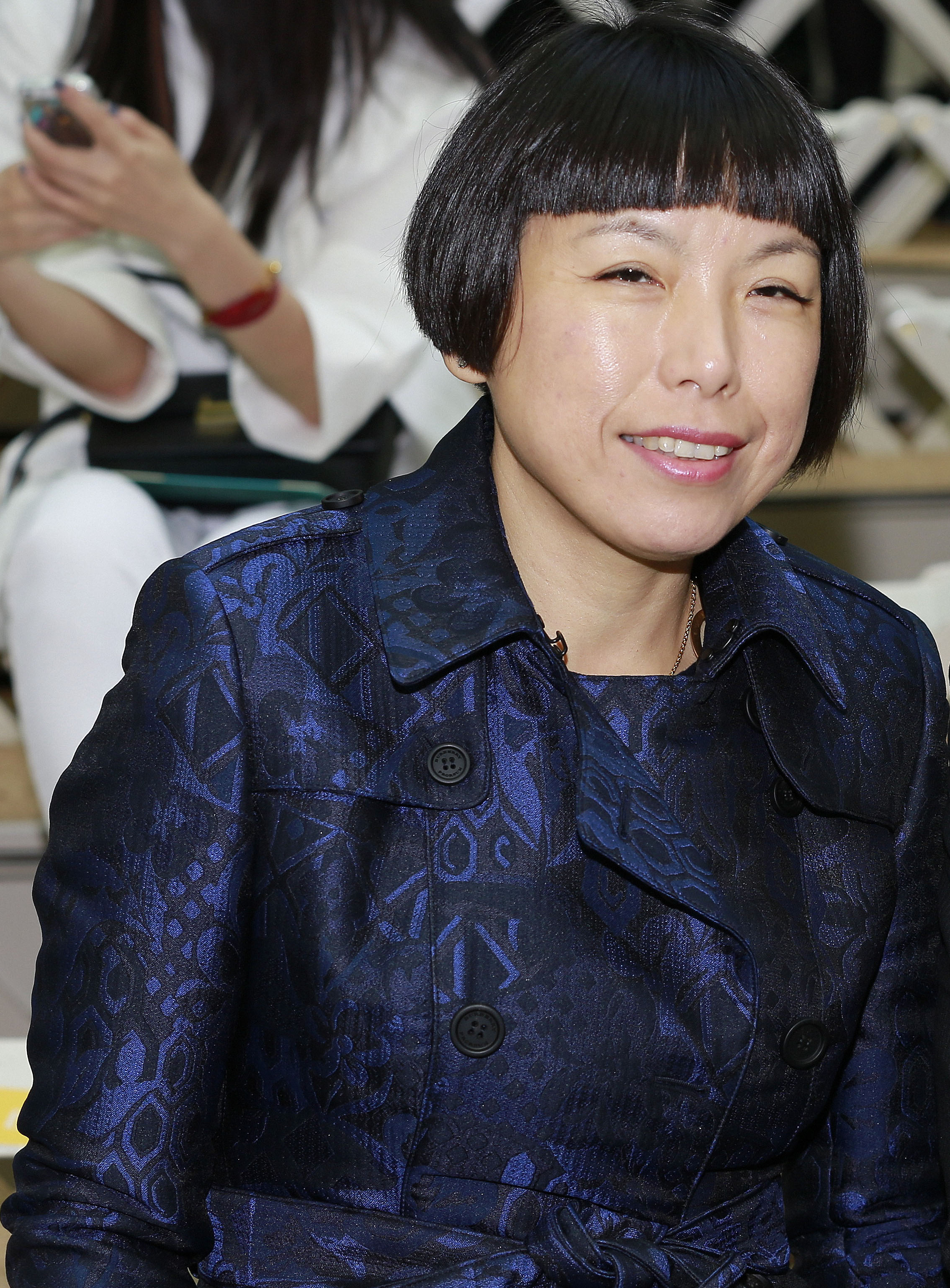
- Angelica Cheung (2014)
- Born: 张宇 (Zhang Yu); 24 April 1966 (age 60); Beijing, China
- Education: Peking University
- Occupation: Fashion journalist
- Agent(s): Kruger Cowne (London, Los Angeles, Nice, Hong Kong)
- Known for: Editor-in-chief of Vogue China
- Children: 1

Angelica Cheung (born April 24, 1966, in Beijing) is a Chinese media executive and venture investor. She began her media career in Hong Kong in 1993, serving as editor-in-chief of Marie Claire Hong Kong and later as editorial director of Elle China, before becoming the founding editor-in-chief of Vogue China and launching its first issue in 2005. One of the most influential figures in China's fashion industry during her Vogue tenure, Cheung left the magazine after 16 years in December 2020. In 2021, she joined Sequoia Capital China as a venture partner, focusing on consumer and lifestyle sectors.

== Early years ==
The daughter of a Chinese diplomat, Cheung was born in Beijing. She studied at Peking University, where she obtained degrees in Law and English Language and Literature. She subsequently received an MBA degree from University of South Australia. Cheung started her career in journalism in 1993 in Hong Kong and worked on all aspects of life there in the run-up to the handover to China in 1997. In 2001, she was named associate publisher of B International and then editor-in-chief of Marie Claire in Hong Kong and, in 2003, editorial director at Elle China in Shanghai. When publisher Condé Nast wanted to launch Vogue in China, the company asked Cheung to take the lead in 2004.

== Career at Vogue China ==
Cheung launched the title's first issue in September 2005. It sold out of its initial print run of 300,000 and had to be reprinted twice.

The youngest of Vogue's editors-in-chief, Cheung was going to leave her career in fashion to become a lawyer when she was offered the role. "At 36 or so, I was grown-up, experienced, worldly, and thought now was the time to finally become a lawyer." Since then, she has grown Vogue China to include several successful IPs. She launched Vogue Me in 2015, which is a 360-degree brand with a bi-monthly print version devoted to the millennial generation, which triggered the global attention of Chinese millennial consumers. In 2016, she launched Vogue Film, which combines fashion with the entertainment industry by way of producing short fashion films. She also launched Vogue Now social media magazine, as well as a network of digital platforms. In 15 years, she has grown Vogue China into an influential empire which puts out 20 issues per year, with a readership of 1.8 million and 42 million social media followers.

According to Forbes, Vogue China prints a full 200 more editorial pages than its American counterpart. Her achievements have won many awards, including the MOCA Legacy Award in 2012, the Asia Couture Federation Award in 2017, the UniSA Alumni Award in 2016, the Advance Global Alumni Award in 2018. She is the Asia Ambassador for the British Fashion Council, Advisor to BAFTA Breakthrough China, has been on the judge panels of the International Woolmark Awards, ANDAM Fashion Award, British Fashion Awards and LVMH Prize for Young Fashion Designers, and has been a frequent public speaker at industry conferences including the NYT International Luxury Conference, the CNI Luxury Conference and One Young World.

== After Vogue China ==
By January 13, 2022, Angelica Cheung was a venture partner at Sequoia Capital China where Vogue Business reported her announcing the acquisition of Seoul-headquartered global fashion and lifestyle brand We11done, for an undisclosed sum. The brand is said to be a Gen Z favorite, popular for fusing Eastern and Western aesthetics in unisex streetwear. Though We11done is not the only acquisition as both Canadian multi-brand retailer and technology platform Ssense and Parisian brand AMI were also invested in. On April 21, 2022, it was announced that along with many other A-list celebrities Cheung's venture capital firm, Sequoia Capital China invested in Parisian ready-to-wear and accessories brand, Destree.
