= Fei Fei Sun =

Chinese model (born 1989)

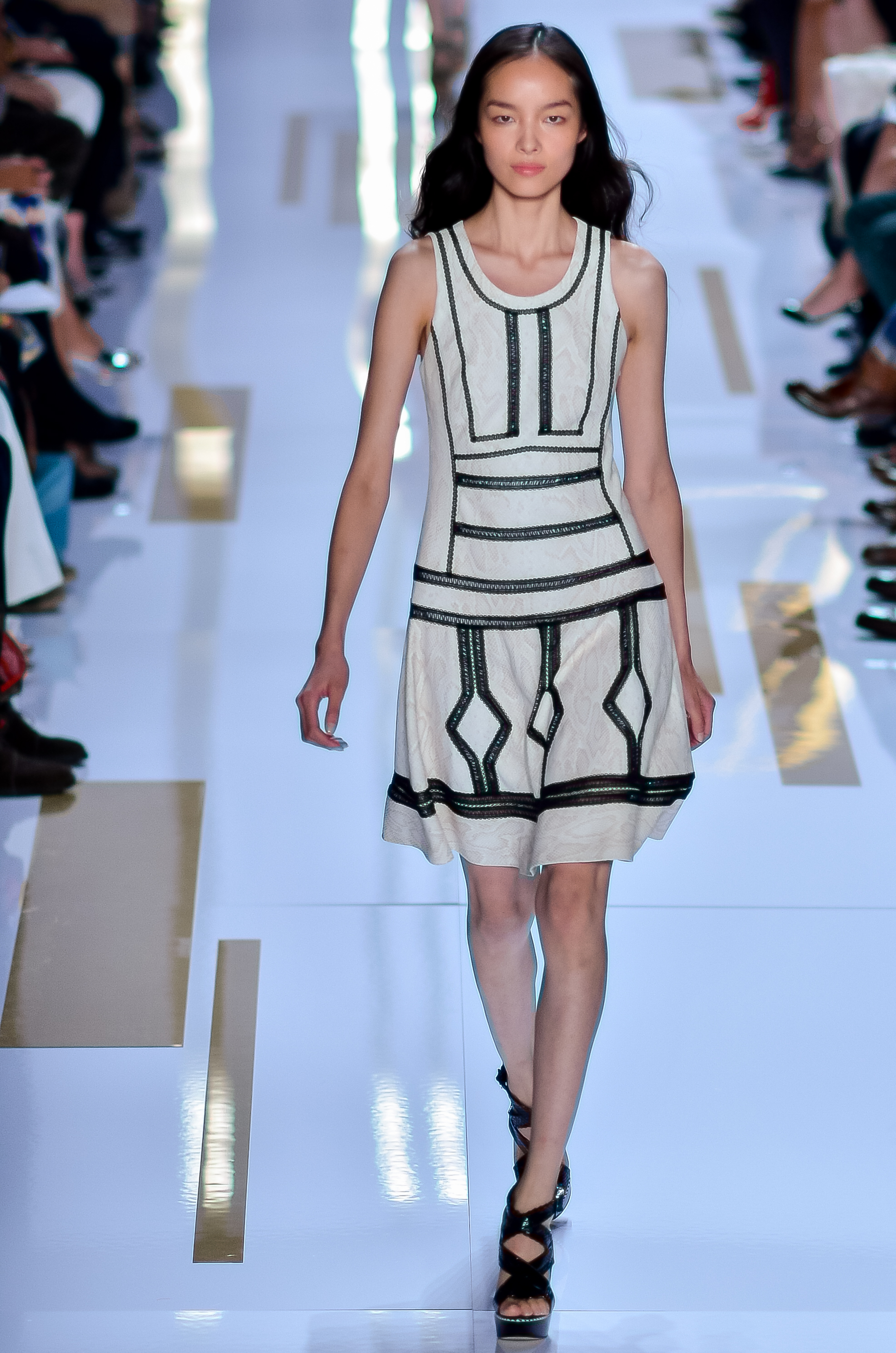
- Sun at New York Fashion Week 2013.
- Born: March 20, 1989 (age 37); Weifang, Shandong, China
- Education: Suzhou University
- Spouse: Liang Zi (m. 2017)
- Modeling information
- Height: 5 ft 10 1/2 in (1.79 m)
- Hair color: Black
- Eye color: Brown
- Agency: Elite Model Management (New York, Paris); Women Management (Milan); Storm Management (London); Donna Models (Tokyo)

Sun Feifei (Chinese: 孙菲菲; born March 20, 1989), commonly known as Fei Fei Sun, is a Chinese model based in New York City. She is ranked as the New Supers by Models.com. Top casting director Ashley Brokaw proclaimed Fei Fei as "an exceptional beauty", considered to be a supermodel by some fashion editors and journalists. She is a spokesmodel of cosmetic giant Estée Lauder.

== Early life and education ==
Sun was born in Weifang, Shandong, China. She was scouted and briefly trained to model as a teenager, but did not start modeling professionally until she graduated from high school. Sun attended Suzhou University, majoring in fashion design.

== Career and success ==
Sun started her modeling career in 2008 when she represented China in Elite Model Look, one of the world's most influential modeling contests. She won the championship in China and eventually won the third prize internationally. She made her international runway debut during London Fashion Week in February 2010, walking for Christopher Kane. In December 2009, she was handpicked by Karl Lagerfeld to walk Chanel's Paris-Shanghai fashion show.

Since then, Sun has appeared on the runway of Jil Sander, Dries Van Noten, Céline, Hermès, Miu Miu, Prada, Valentino, Christian Dior and many others.

In covers and editorials, Sun first appeared in the Vogue Italia editorial in January 2011, The Power of Glamour, shot by Steven Meisel. Later, Meisel also enlisted her for editorials in other major magazines, including Vogue US, V, W, and others. In January 2013, she became the first model of East Asian descent to grace a solo Vogue Italia cover.

In 2014, she was featured alongside eight other models on the cover of the September issue of American Vogue, becoming the first East Asian model on the fold cover of American Vogue. She has also been the cover girl of Vogue China, Vogue Japan and i-D, and has appeared in editorials of Vogue Paris, British Vogue, and Vogue (USA), among others.

In model campaigning, Sun's first major campaign was Dsquared2 Spring/Summer 2011. Since then, she has also been the face of Prada, Louis Vuitton, Lane Crawford, Calvin Klein's cK one, Chanel Beauty, Giorgio Armani Beauty (3 seasons consecutive), CK Calvin Klein beauty, Barneys New York, Diesel, DKNY Be Delicious fragrance, H&M, Prada and most recently Christian Dior and Chanel Watches.

In spring 2012, Sun became the first Asian face of Italian brand Valentino. She was selected as the face for Chanel Beauty, Calvin Klein cosmetics, Giorgio Armani beauty and Dolce and Gabbana skincare.

She made a second appearance on the cover of Vogue Italia (September 2014) edition and also made history as the first East Asian model to appear on the fold cover of American Vogue for the September issue 2014. In June 2015, Fei Fei made a third appearance on the cover of Vogue Italia.

In 2017, she once again fronted Valentino Spring 2017 advertising campaign in addition to campaigns by Theory, Tory Burch and Massimo Dutti. In June 2018, Sun graced the cover of Allure magazine, along with Fernanda Ly and Soo Joo Park. In 2019, she made her appearance on the debut and launch cover of Vogue Hong Kong.

She continues to appear regularly on some of the most selective runways in the industry: Alexander Wang, Prada, Valentino, Jil Sander, Christian Dior, Balenciaga, Givenchy, Chanel and others. She was notably the showstopper of the Vera Wang Spring/Summer 2020 fashion show, held on September 10, 2019 as part of the New York Fashion Week. However, she fell down twice in a row during the finale owing to the designer's very high heels paired with a slippery catwalk.

== Achievements ==
In January 2013, she became the first Asian model to front a solo cover for Vogue Italia issue. She was the first Asian model to front Valentino campaign. In 2014, she became the first East Asian model on the fold cover of the September issue of American Vogue. In 2017, she became the face of cosmetic giant Estée Lauder.
