= Vlada Roslyakova =

Russian-American model (born 1987)

- Влада Рослякова
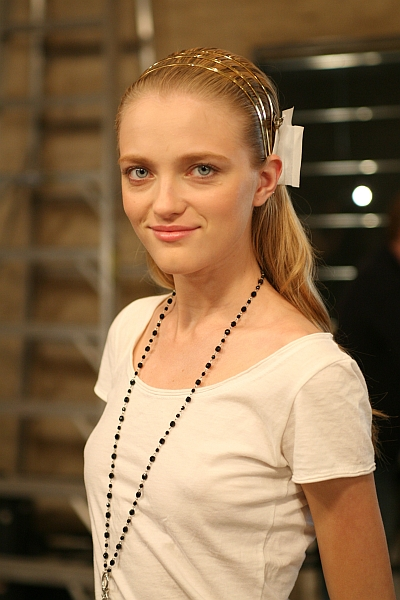
- Roslyakova backstage at the Tommy Hilfiger fashion show in 2009
- Born: Elena Vladimirovna Roslyakova; July 8, 1987 (age 39); Omsk, Russian SFSR, Soviet Union
- Other name: Siberian Princess
- Occupation: Model
- Years active: 2003–present
- Modeling information
- Height: 1.78 m (5 ft 10 in)
- Hair color: Blond
- Eye color: Blue
- Agency: Women Management (New York, Milan); Premium Models (Paris); Models 1 (London); View Management (Barcelona); Elite Model Management (Copenhagen); UNIQUE DENMARK (Copenhagen); Modelink (Gothenburg); Munich Models (Munich); Donna Models (Tokyo)

Elena Vladimirovna "Vlada" Roslyakova (Note: In this name that follows East Slavic naming customs, the patronymic is Vladimirovna and the family name is Roslyakova.) (Russian: Елена Владимировна "Влада" Рослякова; born July 8, 1987) is a Russian model. Vogue Paris called her one of the top models of the 2000s decade.

== Early life ==
Roslyakova was born on July 8, 1987, in Omsk, Russia.

== Career ==
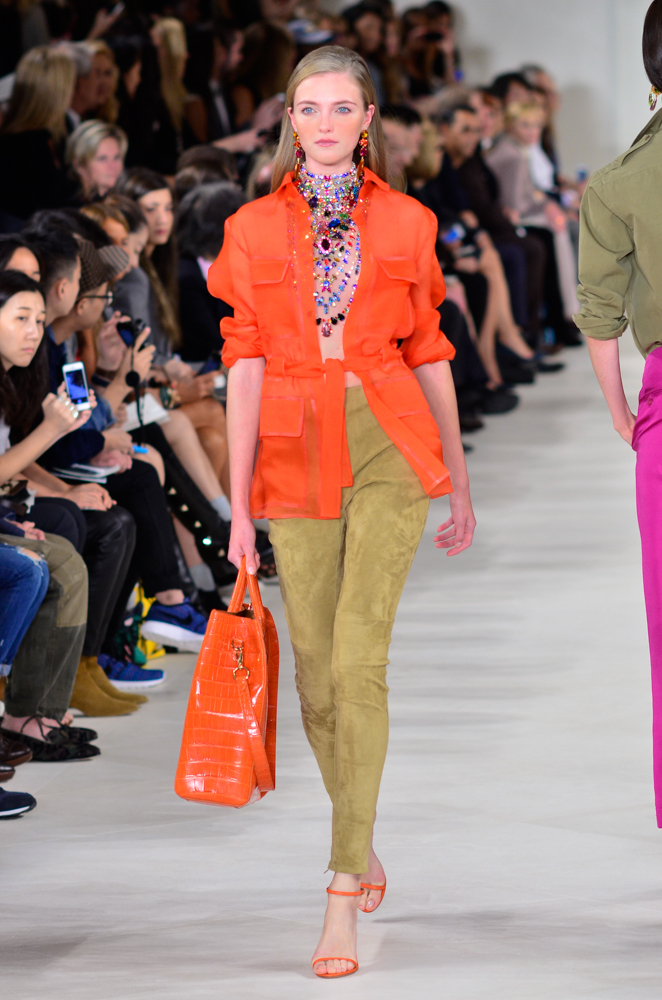
Roslyakova walking for Ralph Lauren Spring/Summer 2015

Roslyakova belongs to the "Wide Eyed Doll" era of models, along with models Sasha Pivovarova, Jessica Stam, Lily Cole, and Gemma Ward.

In 2005, Roslyakova landed her first Vogue cover with Vogue France. During her second season on the runway, which was Fall/Winter 2005, Roslyakova walked in 78 shows during the ready-to-wear season, including all the major fashion weeks. For the Fall/Winter 2006 runway season, she walked 86 or 92 shows (only including NYC, London, Paris, and Milan).

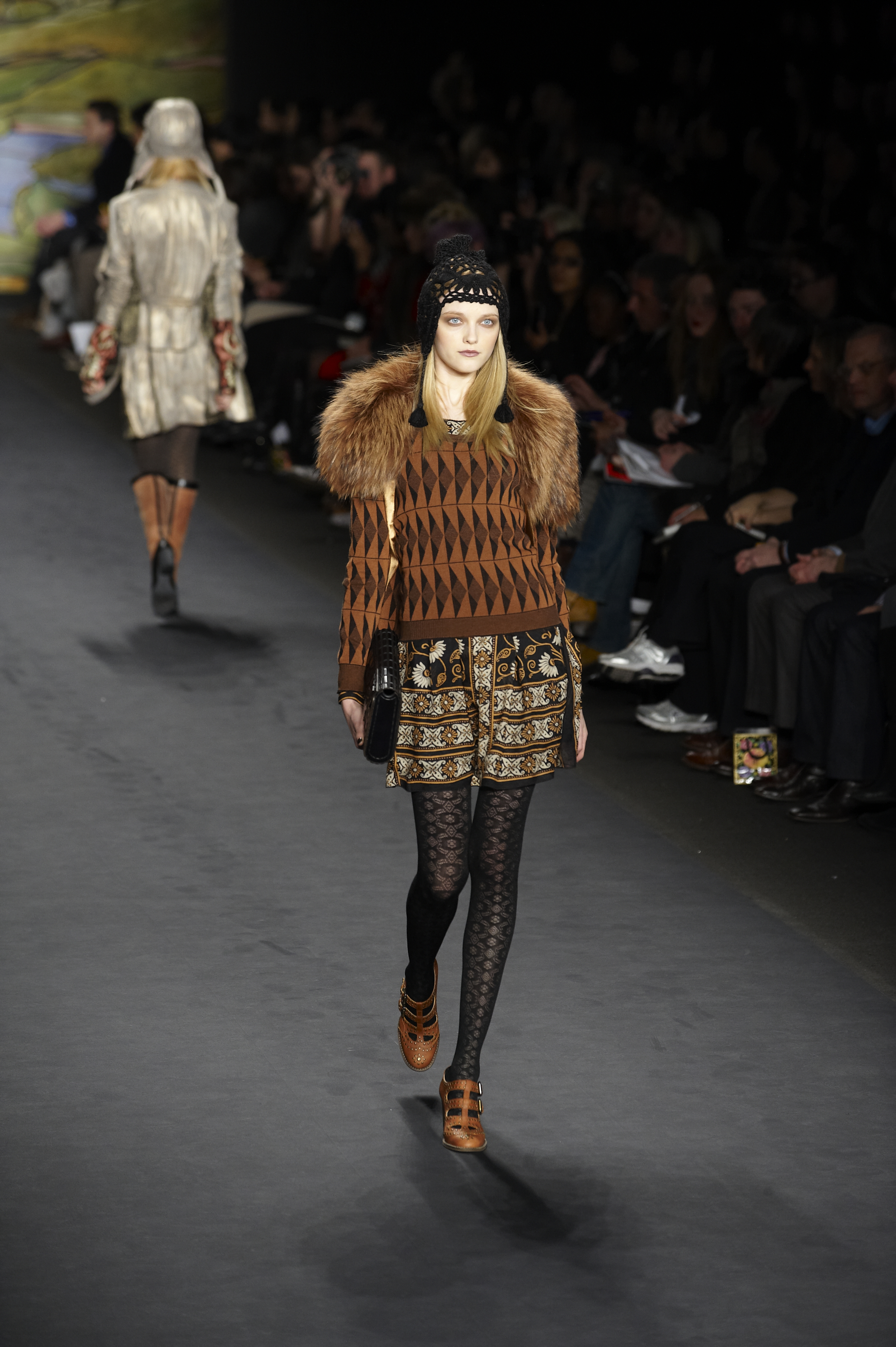
Vlada Roslyakova walking for Anna Sui Fall/Winter 2010

Her runway credits include fashion houses and designers Alberta Ferretti, Alexander McQueen, Balenciaga, Blumarine, Bottega Veneta, Burberry Prorsum, Calvin Klein, Céline, Chanel, Chloé, Christian Dior, Comme des Garçons, Dolce & Gabbana, DSquared², Emanuel Ungaro, Emilio Pucci, Etro, Fendi, Gianfranco Ferré, Giorgio Armani, Givenchy, Gucci, Hermès, Jean Paul Gaultier, Jil Sander, Kenzo, Lanvin, Loewe, Louis Vuitton, MaxMara, Missoni, Miu Miu, Moschino, Mugler, Nina Ricci, Prada, Roberto Cavalli, Salvatore Ferragamo, Sonia Rykiel, Stella McCartney, Valentino, Versace, Viktor & Rolf, Schiaparelli, Yohji Yamamoto, Oscar de la Renta, and Yves Saint Laurent.

She has appeared in editorials for French, British, Italian, and American Vogue.

Roslyakova has been the face of Nina Ricci, Vera Wang, Christian Lacroix, DKNY, Karl Lagerfeld, Dolce & Gabbana, and Swarovski.

In 2007, Roslyakova appeared on the cover of Vogue Brasil.

In September 2023, she was a NYFW exclusive and returned to the catwalk for Ralph Lauren Spring/Summer 2024, she had not walked for the Ralph Lauren brand in nearly 6 years. In April 2024, she walked Ralph Lauren yet again for the Fall/Holiday 2024 collection.

Vogue Paris declared her one of the top 30 models of the 2000s.

Roslyakova has been called a supermodel and catwalk legend by American Vogue. As of 2024 she is one of the top 10 most popular Russian models.

In 2024, she revealed she would be part of a podcast called the 'Fashion Host Podcast' alongside fellow model Ines Crnokrak.

=== Advertising campaigns ===
In 2008 she became the brand ambassador and face for designer Karl Lagerfeld, replacing Gemma Ward. Roslyakova also became the face of Dolce & Gabbana in 2007. She has been featured in advertising campaigns for Nina Ricci, Moschino, Hermès, MaxMara, Christian Lacroix, Calvin Klein, Burberry, Dolce & Gabbana, Versace, Viktor & Rolf, Jill Stuart Beauty, DKNY, Roberto Cavalli, Daks Japan, Gap, Barney's, Anna Sui, Etro, Cartier, Sonia Rykiel, Belstaff, Hobbs, Alcacuz, Swarovski, Diamond Dazzle, Derercuny, Victoria's Secret, Karl Lagerfeld and Lacoste. She has also appeared in look-books for Prada, Chanel, Gucci, Versace, Givenchy, Dolce & Gabbana, Donna Karan, Lanvin, Ralph Lauren, Alberta Ferretti, Oscar de la Renta, and many more.

In 2010 she was the look-book model for Versace Fall/Winter 2010 catalog.

In 2020, Roslyakova appeared in the Badgely Mischka Spring-Summer campaign and also in the Desigual Campaign collaboration with Christian Lacroix.

== Personal life ==
In a 2023 interview, she revealed that, "I continue to work as a model, but much less than before - I've still been doing this for scary to say how many years. Fashion is not only about clothes, but also about people. But, fortunately, I have enough for my bread and butter, although I no longer shoot for advertising campaigns that would be displayed all over the world." She also revealed in the interview she was previously married but has been divorced since 2020.
