= Margaret Zhang =

Australian fashion editor

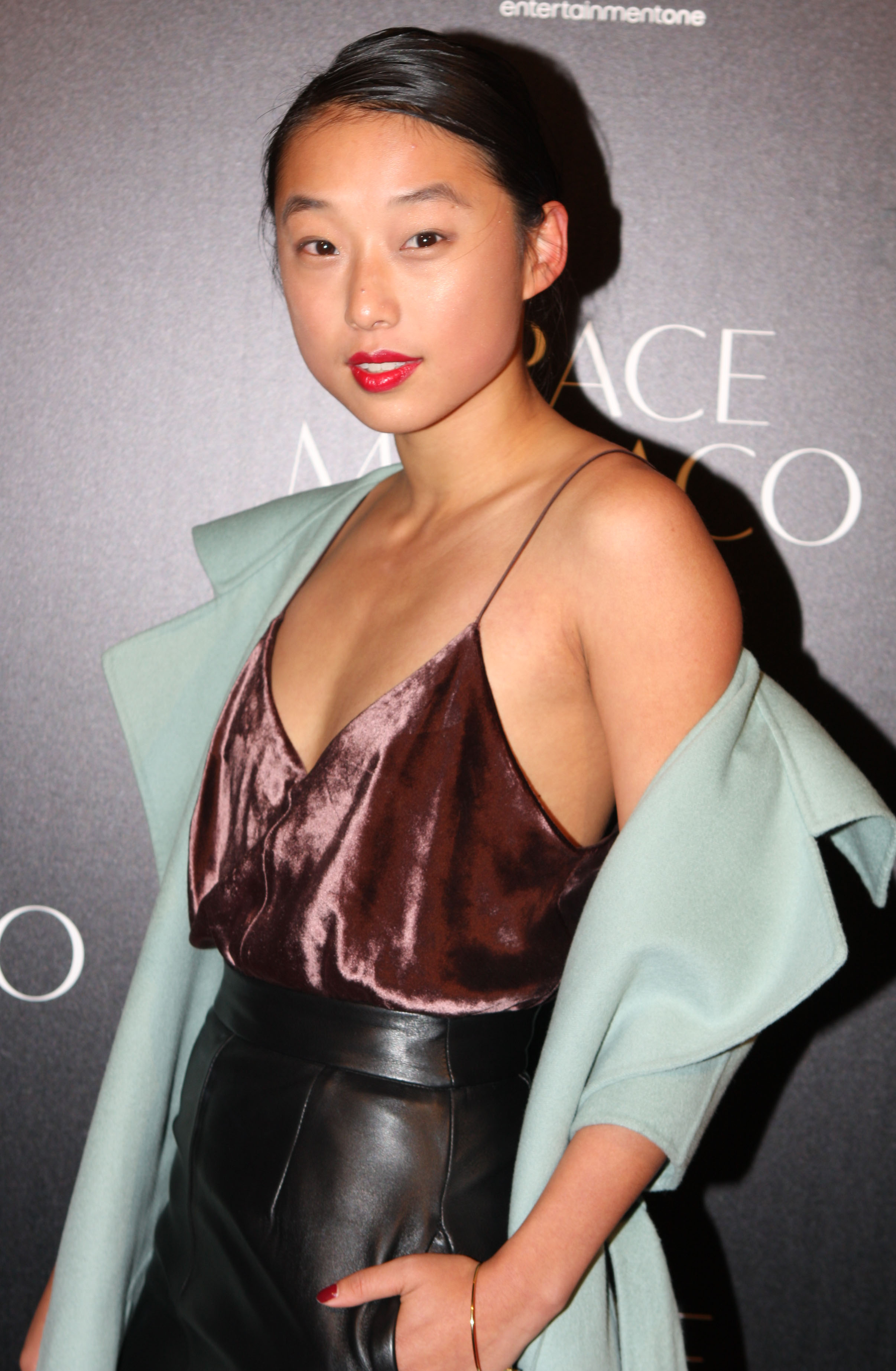
- Zhang in 2014
- Born: 27 May 1993 (age 33); Sydney, Australia
- Occupations: Editor, photographer, film director, consultant, stylist, writer, entrepreneur
- Partner: Miguel (2024-present)
- Children: 1

Margaret Zhang (章凝) (born May 27, 1993) is an Australian filmmaker, writer, model, and creative director. She was the editor-in-chief of Vogue China until 2024.

== Early life ==
Zhang was born in Australia to Chinese parents. Zhang’s parents moved to Sydney, Australia from Huangyan, a town in China’s Zhejiang province. Her mother is from a farming family and her father was from a city. Her father Liangchi Zhang, worked at the University of Sydney as a professor of mechanical engineering. As a child Zhang and her brother studied ballet and piano. The world of dance introduced her to fashion.

In 2009 at the age of 16, Zhang launched her blog 'Shine by Three' as a repository for her personal thoughts and images that inspired her.

Zhang received her bachelor of commerce and law from The University of Sydney.

== Career ==
While attending the University of Sydney, Zhang arranged to attend her first fashion week in New York with financial support from the business school. In 2014, she collaborated with Matchesfashion as a guest buyer during New York Fashion Week.

In 2014, Zhang was part of series one of Australian reality documentary television series, Fashion Bloggers. The reality show chronicled both the professional and personal lives of independent lifestyle and fashion bloggers.

In 2015, Zhang became one of Clinique’s global faces for the company’s #FaceForward campaign. In the same year, Zhang won Elle Digital Influencer of the Year award.

As word of her influence and skills spread, Zhang created photography, styling, and creative direction for the likes of L’Officiel, Harper’s Bazaar, Nylon, Marie Claire, Buro24/7 and Elle. Her profile as an influencer and model has grown over the years and she is a street style and front-row catwalk regular. Zhang has appeared on the covers of Elle, Rouge Fashion Book and Nylon. CNN identified Zhang as a leading fashion photographer in Asia and she went on to be the first Asian face to cover ELLE Australia.

Established in 2016, Zhang is the co-founder of 'Background', which is a global consultancy that helps bridge western and Chinese cultures and has worked with companies such as YouTube, Airbnb, Swarovski, Louis Vuitton and Mulberry on their campaigns. She credits her drive to create relationships with brands, instead of a transactional approach, to providing her with bigger opportunities to support and grow creative ideas together.

At a solo show in Sydney in 2017, Zhang exhibited a series of 39 unseen photographic works and premiered her first short film which was a 15-minute exploration of her relationship with classical music. It received critical acclaim.

In 2018, Zhang co-curated the first annual FOREFRONT Summit focused on inter-industry business problem-solving which led her to develop FOREFRONT+, a round table series of conversations that cover subjects of universal concern.

In 2019, for the relaunch of THE FACE Magazine, Zhang was brought in as Creative-Director-at-Large for Asia.

In 2021, it was announced that Zhang would become the Editor in Chief of Vogue China at the age of 27, the youngest EIC at Vogue. Zhang's understanding of digital and emerging trends for a new generation of Chinese was one of the reasons she was hired as she succeeded Angelica Cheung.

Zhang resides between New York and Shanghai and is currently working on her first feature film.

“I’d love to be held as an example of high work. I actually don’t know where I’ll end up in 10, 15, 20 years. The industry keeps changing. I work across so many different fields that at any given point in time it’s a different breakdown of [the type of work] I’m doing. I think more and more I’d like to promote for young people that if you want to go down that path, and that’s your role and people need to do it, that’s awesome. It’s okay to build a career path that isn’t conventional and isn’t something that some body has come up with before. My career path is, in fashion, unconventional, and there are hundreds of careers paths that are yet to be realised I think. My family has nothing to do with fashion at all, in fact they actually don’t know what I do.” - Zhang to Grazia Magazine

In February 2024, Zhang was announced that she would leave Vogue China when her contract ends in March and the June issue is her final one.

== Personal life ==
Zhang has a son, Angelito (born September 9, 2024) with American singer-songwriter Miguel. In August 2026, it was reported that they are expecting their second child.
