= Raquel Zimmermann =

Brazilian supermodel (born 1983)

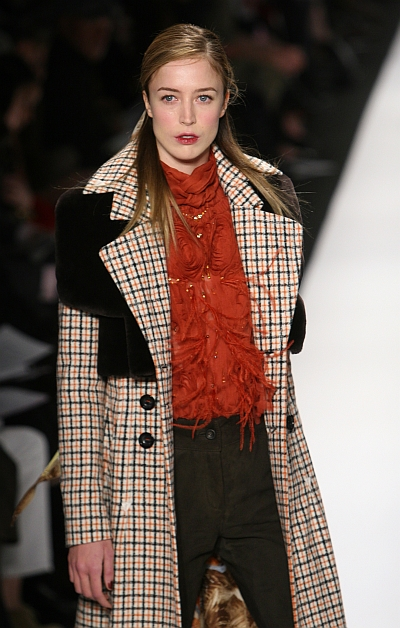
- Born: May 6, 1983 (age 43); Rio Grande do Sul, Brazil
- Occupation: Model
- Modeling information
- Height: 1.79 m (5 ft 10 1/2 in)
- Hair color: Brown
- Eye color: Blue
- Agency: DNA Model Management (New York); VIVA Model Management (Paris, London); Why Not Model Management (Milan)

Raquel Cristina Zimmermann (born 6 July 1983 in Bom Retiro do Sul, Rio Grande do Sul, Brazil) is a Brazilian supermodel. She began her career in the late 1990s and quickly gained international recognition, appearing on the covers of major fashion magazines such as Vogue, Harper's Bazaar, and Elle. Zimmermann has walked for luxury brands including Dior, Versace, Chanel, Louis Vuitton, and Hermès, and has been featured in high-profile advertising campaigns as well as the Pirelli Calendar photographed by Steven Meisel.

== Biography ==
Raquel Zimmermann was born in Bom Retiro do Sul, Rio Grande do Sul, Brazil. She is known to practice Transcendental Meditation.

She is also a descendant of German immigrants from Bavaria that settled in Brazil in the 1800s.

== Discovery and modeling career ==
=== Early career (2000–2004) ===
Zimmermann began her modeling career at a young age, appearing in editorials and runway shows in Brazil before gaining international attention. In the early 2000s, she made her breakthrough on the global fashion scene when she was featured on the cover of Vogue Italia in September 2000, an early milestone that helped establish her presence internationally. She subsequently appeared on the cover of Vogue Paris later the same year, further consolidating her profile.

Throughout the early 2000s, Zimmermann walked the runways of the major fashion capitals, including New York, Milan, London and Paris, and appeared in campaigns for high‑end fashion houses. She was selected as the face of campaigns for brands including Dior and Hermès, and worked with leading designers in both editorial and advertising contexts.

=== Rise to prominence (2006–2009) ===
By the mid‑2000s, Zimmermann had established herself as one of the most sought‑after models on the international fashion scene. She appeared in a wide range of advertising campaigns and runway shows for major fashion houses, including Dior, Hermès, Balenciaga, Louis Vuitton, Gucci and Versace.

Zimmermann became a regular presence in leading fashion magazines, including Vogue (various international editions), Harper's Bazaar, W, Elle and Numéro, and appeared on numerous covers throughout her career.

In May 2007, Zimmermann appeared on the cover of American Vogue "World's Next Top Models" issue, a group editorial that featured a collective of leading international models including Lily Donaldson, Doutzen Kroes, Caroline Trentini, and others.

Zimmermann also appeared in major advertising campaigns and special projects. In 2007 she starred in the first television commercial for the fragrance Gucci by Gucci, directed by filmmaker David Lynch, which featured top models dressed in Gucci gowns.

In 2008, casting agent James Scully, known for selecting models for top runway shows, described Zimmermann as "the energizer model" and praised her versatility and professionalism, stating that she could fit in any show and that her timeliness rivaled legendary models such as Cindy Crawford.

During this period, Zimmermann was ranked at the top of the international model listings on Models.com. She held the number one position on the site's Top 50 Models ranking from December 2007 until February 2010, reflecting her prominence within the industry.

In 2009, she was named one of the top 30 models of the decade by Vogue Paris.

=== Continued success (2010–present) ===
In the 2010s, Zimmermann continued to maintain a high-profile presence in the fashion industry. She appeared on numerous magazine covers and editorial spreads, including solo covers for Vogue editions around the world, such as Vogue Brazil and Vogue Italia, illustrating her enduring appeal in fashion media.

Zimmermann made a notable appearance in the music video for Lady Gaga's song "Born This Way" (2011), where she appeared in multiple scenes with designer clothing and conceptual fashion imagery.

In 2015, Zimmermann was featured as one of the models photographed for the prestigious Pirelli Calendar by Steven Meisel, alongside fellow supermodels including Gigi Hadid, Isabeli Fontana and Adriana Lima, reinforcing her status among the top figures in fashion.

Zimmermann also appeared in the Versace Spring/Summer 2016 campaign alongside models such as Gigi Hadid and Natasha Poly, further illustrating her continued demand by major fashion houses.

In addition to her fashion work, Zimmermann has been associated with major beauty brands; she was announced as a Revlon ambassador in 2018.

== Personal life ==
Zimmermann was in a long‑term relationship with Spanish photographer Ruy Sánchez Blanco, with whom she lived in New York City. The couple’s separation was described in press coverage as mutual and amicable, with both focusing on their individual paths thereafter.
