= Karl Lindman =

Swedish fashion entrepreneur and model

- Born: December 1, 1981 (age 44); Bromma, Stockholm, Sweden
- Occupation: Fashion entrepreneur
- Known for: Co-founder of TOTEME
- Notable work: TOTEME's visual identity and brand positioning
- Spouse: Elin Kling (m. 2014)

Karl Johan Lindman (born 1 December 1981) is a Swedish fashion entrepreneur and co-founder of the fashion brand TOTEME. He is also a former successful model.

== Career ==
Karl Lindman, who grew up in Bromma outside Stockholm, began his career as an art director, holding roles such as Senior Art Director at the New York advertising agency Baron & Baron and Design Director at Interview Magazine.

In 2014, he co-founded the Swedish fashion brand TOTEME in New York with Elin Kling, the same year the couple got married. Lindman designed TOTEME's logo and took charge of developing the brand's visual identity, created to complement Elin Kling's vision. Today, Karl oversees TOTEME's brand positioning and the development of stores worldwide.

In 2016, the couple moved the business to Stockholm, where they opened TOTEME's first flagship store in 2019. Since then, the brand has continued its global expansion, opening flagship stores in New York (2022), London (2023), and Los Angeles (2024).

In 2024, Karl and Elin received the prestigious "Entrepreneurs of the Year" award from the Swedish business newspaper Dagens Industri. That same year, they were also included in Business of Fashion's BoF500. In 2024, TOTEME debuted both its first fashion show in Paris and its presentation at New York Fashion Week.

=== Modeling career ===
Karl Lindman was discovered by photographer Bruce Weber during Weber's visit to Sweden in 2002. His first modeling assignment was published in the February 2003 issue of Vanity Fair, and the following year, he became the face of Calvin Klein's spring and summer campaign in 2004. He continued his modeling career, working with several international fashion houses.
