= Qin Shupei =

Chinese supermodel and actress (born 1989)

- 秦舒培
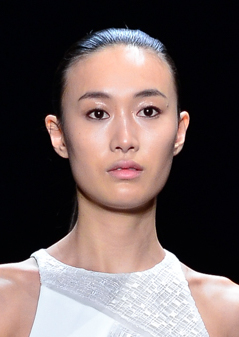
- Qin in 2014
- Born: 10 August 1989 (age 37); Kaifeng, Henan, China
- Other names: Shu Pei; Shu
- Occupations: Fashion model, actress
- Years active: 2007–present
- Spouse: Zhao Lei (m. 2012; div. 2015)
- Partner: Edison Chen (2015–present)
- Children: Alaia Chen (daughter)
- Modeling information
- Height: 1.78 m (5 ft 10 in)
- Hair color: Black
- Eye color: Brown
- Agency: DNA Models (New York); Oui Management (Paris) VIE Models (Hong Kong)

Qin Shupei (Chinese: 秦舒培; pinyin: Qín Shūpeí; born August 10, 1989) is a Chinese supermodel and actress.

== Early life ==
Qin Shupei was born in Kaifeng, Henan, China. She attended school in New York City. While studying in New York City, Shupei was discovered as a model.

== Career ==
Qin signed with Next Management in 2007. In September 2007, she debuted at the spring Rachel Roy show in New York and also walked for Brian Reyes, Catherine Malandrino, and Verrier. She appeared in a British Elle editorial in August 2008, and in September 2008, she appeared in a Vogue China editorial, alongside models Karlie Kloss and Hanne Gaby Odiele.

She walked in the Victoria's Secret Fashion Show in November 2012.

In 2010, Qin had walked 60 shows in total, and was selected as one of the Top 50 models on models.com in 2011. She became one of the spokespersons for Maybelline and Vera Wang. Shu Pei received her first Elle Style Award in July, 2010.

In 2012, she walked for brands such as Gucci, Burberry, Vera Wang, Chanel, Christian Dior, and Versace, etc.

In March, 2015, she shot her first film Oh My God directed by Leste Chen. The film was shot with Chen Xuedong, Zhang Yixing, Li Xiaolu, and others. In 2015, Shupei participated in The Met Gala, also known as the Met Ball, wearing a Tommy Hilfiger haute couture dress.

On April 27, 2012, Qin Shupei became an ambassador for a movie event hosted by Huayi Brothers' Non-profit Foundation, Huayi Brothers Fashion Group and Elle. On May 19, 2012, she participated a non-profit sport event called NBAJam Live NBAJam Live hosted by Huayi Brothers Media Corporation and NBA China. On the night of NBAJam Live, Shupei and fashion model Mengyao Xi and other stars of Huayi Brothers Media Corporation had an international basketball competition with NBA player Brandon Jennings, DeMar Darnell DeRozan, Horace Grant and Gary Dwayne Payton. On November 8, 2012, Shupei participated Swarovski's art exhibition in Shanghai, China.

In 2013, Qin became one of the celebrities to pose nude for fashion designer Marc Jacobs' "Protect The Skin You're In" T-shirt campaign against skin cancer.

== Personal life ==
Qin married Zhao Lei (also named Leigh Gow), the general manager of the Huayi Brothers Fashion Group in 2012; they divorced in 2015. Qin later went into a relationship with Edison Chen.

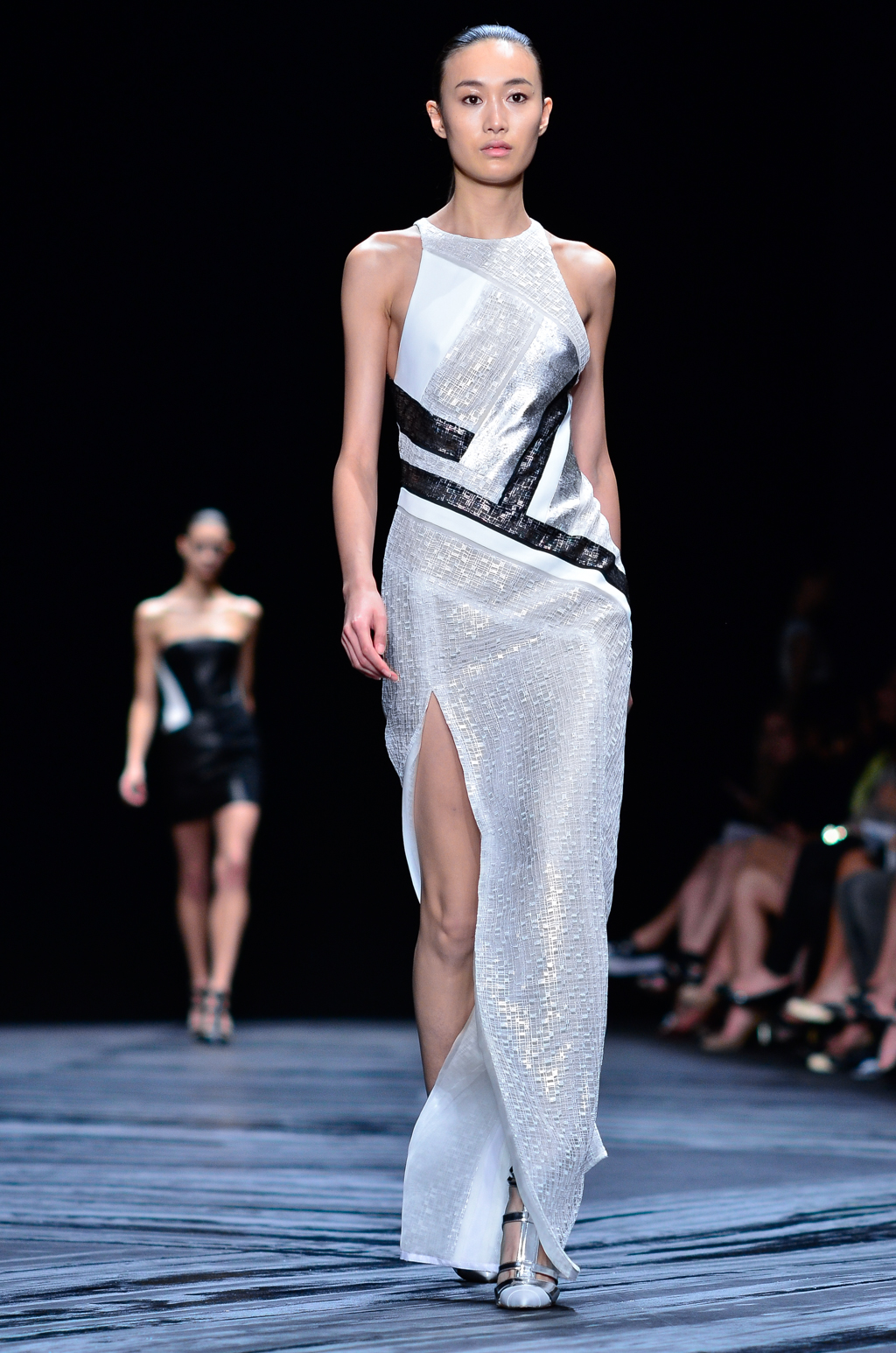
Shu Pei J Mendel SS15

She gave birth to her first child, a daughter named Alaia Chen, in 2017.

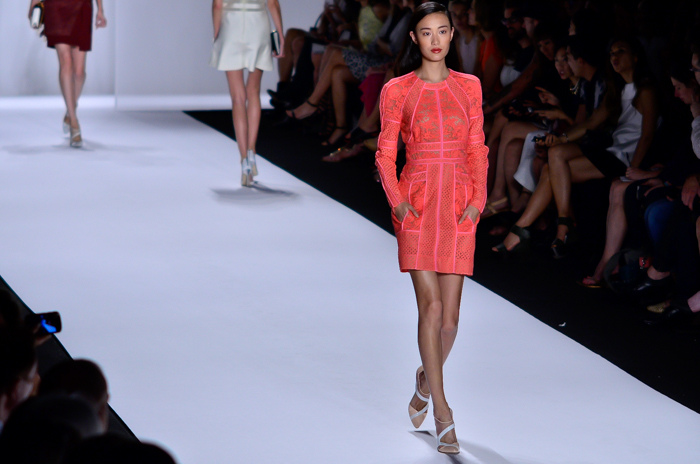
Shu Pei J Mendel SS14
