= Lily Donaldson =

British model (born 1988)

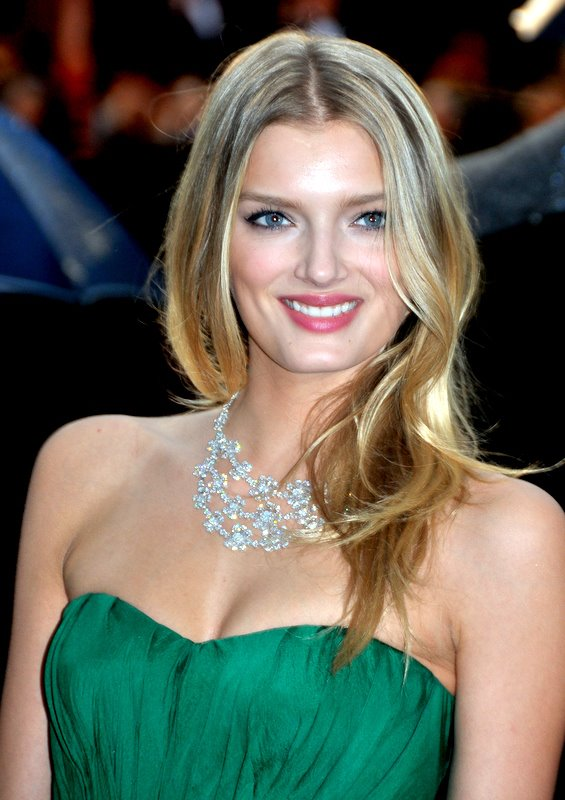
- Donaldson in 2012
- Born: Lily Monica Donaldson; 27 January 1987 (age 39); Chelsea, London, England
- Occupation: Model
- Years active: 2003–present
- Relatives: Mick Fleetwood (great-uncle)
- Modelling information
- Height: 1.79 m (5 ft 10 1/2 in)
- Hair colour: Blonde
- Eye colour: Blue
- Agency: IMG Models (worldwide); Stockholmsgruppen (Stockholm)

Lily Monica Donaldson (born 27 January 1987) is an English model. She was featured on the cover of American Vogue's May 2007 issue as one of the "World's Next Top Models" and was recognized by Vogue Paris in 2009 as one of the top 30 models of the 2000s. She has appeared on 30 international covers of Vogue.

== Early life ==
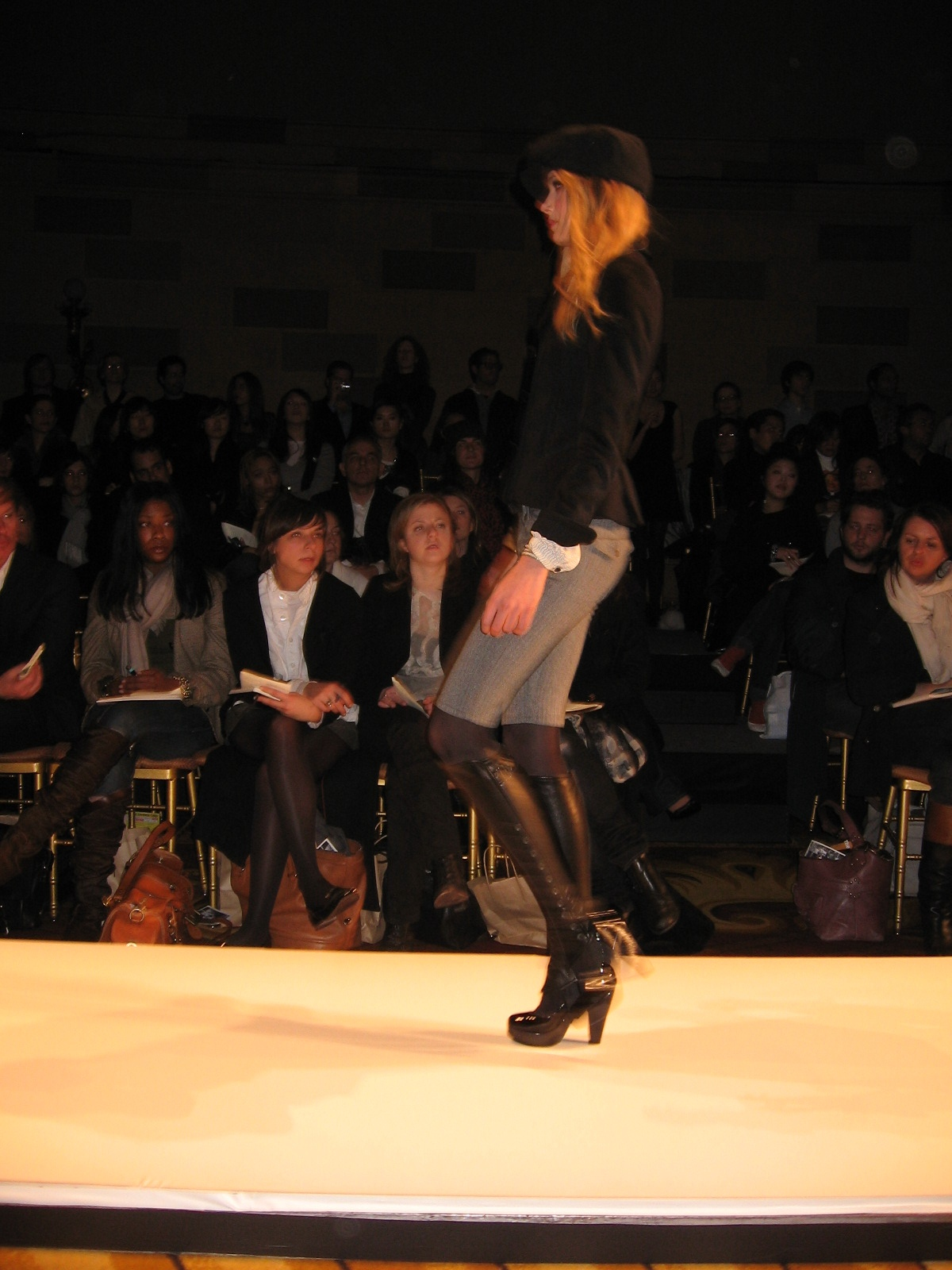
Lily Donaldson modelling at New York Fashion Week 2007

Donaldson was born in Chelsea, London, the daughter of photographer Matthew Donaldson. She was educated at the Camden School for Girls and lived in Kentish Town with her parents. She has a younger sister named Aurelia and a younger half-brother named Jesse.

== Career ==
Donaldson was scouted by Select Model Management in 2003 at the age of 16 while she was shopping in Camden. She went on to make her debut in the Fall/Winter 2004 season, walking in shows for designers such Chanel, Louis Vuitton, Moschino, Missoni and Jill Sander.

Donaldson has notably landed big campaigns for major fashion houses such as Burberry, Gucci, Versace and Gap.

In the May 2007 issue of American Vogue, she was featured on the cover with fellow models Doutzen Kroes, Caroline Trentini, Raquel Zimmermann, Sasha Pivovarova, Agyness Deyn, Coco Rocha, Hilary Rhoda, Chanel Iman, and Jessica Stam as the "World's Next Top Models". Later, in the September 2007 issue of British Vogue, she was named a "Head Girl", a model to watch out for in the upcoming season.

Donaldson has appeared on 30 international covers of Vogue which includes the British, American, Italia, China, Australia, Japan, Turkey, Taiwan, Korea, Portugal, Spain and Russian editions. In 2010, she made her Victoria's Secret Fashion Show debut and also walked in the 2011, 2012, 2013, 2014, 2015, and 2016 shows.

In 2009, Vogue Paris declared her one of the top 30 models of the 2000s. Donaldson was the face of the Monsoon Accessorize campaign for Spring Summer 2011.

Donaldson appeared in the closing ceremony of the 2012 Summer Olympics closing ceremony as one of the British models showcasing bespoke fashions created by British designers specifically for the event. She wore a gold ball gown by Vivienne Westwood alongside Naomi Campbell, Kate Moss, David Gandy, Karen Elson, Jourdan Dunn, Georgia May Jagger and Stella Tennant.

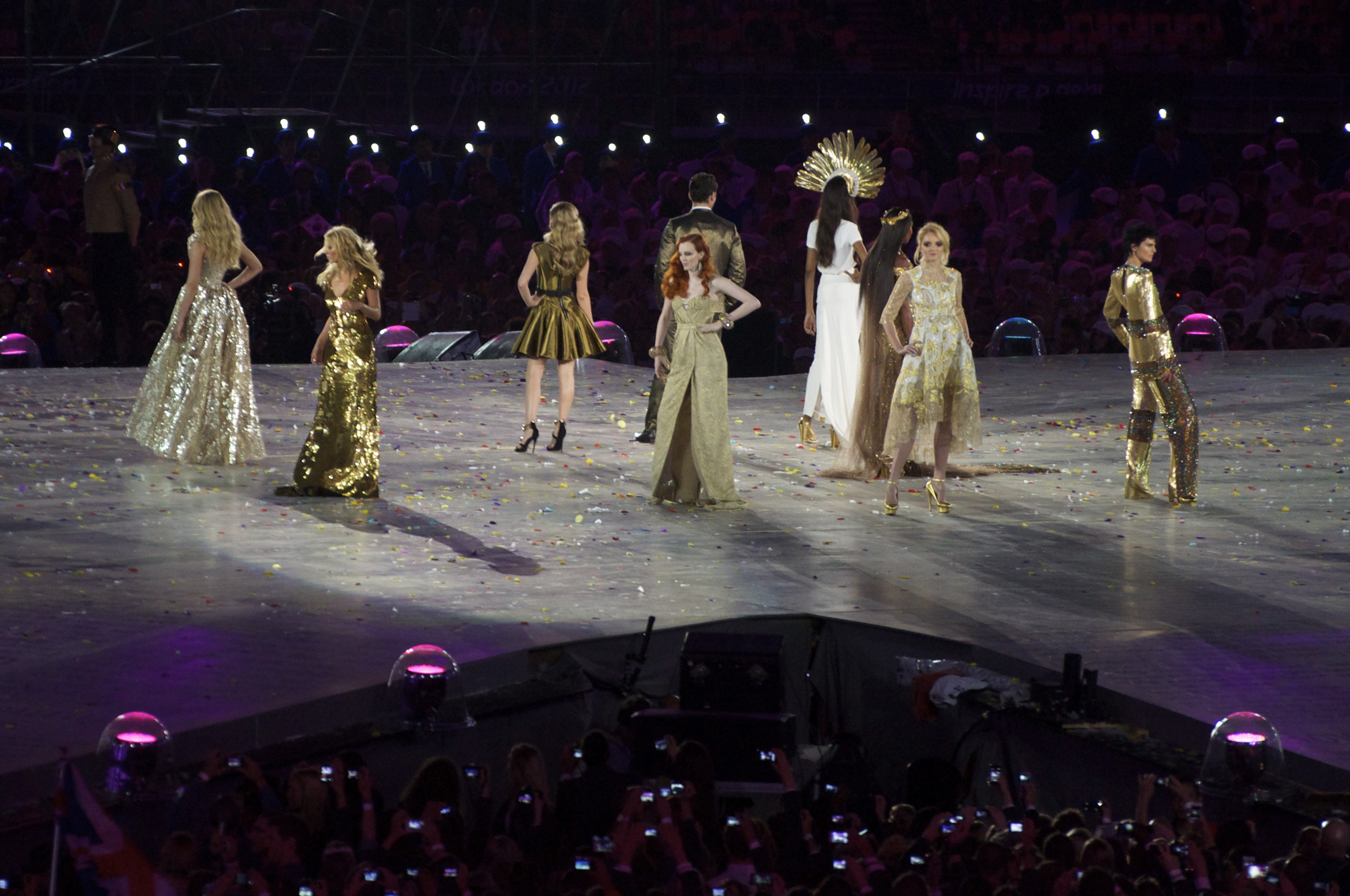
London 2012 Models (2)

== Personal life ==
She is close friends with models Gemma Ward and Irina Lazareanu, the latter with whom she shot two Mulberry campaigns.

After five years living in New York City, Donaldson moved back to London in late 2010.

Donaldson's great-uncle is Mick Fleetwood, the co-founder of Fleetwood Mac, and the actress Susan Fleetwood was her great-aunt.
