= Vogue China =

Chinese fashion magazine

Vogue China 服饰与美容
- Cover of 100th issue (December 2013) featuring actress Shu Qi
- Editorial Director: Rocco Liu (2024-present)
- Former editors: Margaret Zhang (章凝) 2021–2024; Angelica Cheung (张宇) 2005–2020
- Categories: Fashion
- Frequency: Monthly
- Circulation: 2 million
- Publisher: Condé Nast with China Pictorial Publishing House
- First issue: September 2005
- Country: China
- Based in: Beijing
- Language: Chinese
- Website: vogue.com.cn

Vogue China (Chinese: 服饰与美容) is the Chinese edition of Vogue magazine. The magazine carries a mixture of local and foreign content. The magazine is published by Condé Nast in partnership with the state-owned China Pictorial Publishing House.

There are 16 editions of Vogue China published every year. As of November 2020, Vogue China circulated around 2 million copies. Mario Testino has described Vogue China as the world's "most important Vogue".

== History ==
=== Under Angelica Cheung (2005–2020) ===
The first issue of Vogue China was released for September 2005; its debut had been in the works for over two years. Prior to the 2004 appointment of Angelica Cheung (张宇) as editorial director, Shaway Yeh led the magazine during the pre-launch period from 2003 to 2004 as editor-in-chief. Cheung previously served as the editor of the Hong Kong edition of Marie Claire and the Chinese edition of Elle.

The magazine's first issue cover featured Australian model Gemma Ward alongside Chinese models Du Juan (杜鹃), Wang Wenqin (王雯琴), Tong Chenjie (佟晨洁), Liu Dan (刘丹), and Ni Mingxi (倪明曦). Its initial print run of 300,000 copies sold out, requiring a second printing to be made.

In 2016 a spin-off of Vogue China called Vogue Me was launched. The magazine was aimed at the millennial audience. The magazine ceased publication 2021 when its successor Vogue+ was launched, aimed at Gen Z.

=== Under Margaret Zhang (2021–2024) ===
Australian-born digital influencer Margaret Zhang became the editor-in-chief of Vogue China in February 2021, replacing Angelica Cheung who had been the editor-in-chief since the magazine's launch in 2005. Zhang was appointed to the role of editor-in-chief at the age of 27, making her the youngest EIC in Vogue history.

In Autumn of 2021, Vogue China launched a new bi-monthly edition titled Vogue Plus (+). The edition targets Gen Z audiences and is run by Lily Chou. The first cover of Vogue+, featured Timothée Chalamet, both as its cover model and guest editor, and discussed Chalamet's performance in Dune.

In February 2024, it was announced that Zhang would leave Vogue China when her contract ends in March and the June issue would be the final issue under her direction. Condé Nast began an extensive search for a new editor-in-chief. In July 2024, it was announced that Rocco Liu of GQ China would be in charge of the editorial direction of the Vogue China brand across all platforms with immediate effect.

== Advertising and profit ==
Many advertisers are competing for space in Chinese publications. "Advertisers don't pay attention to large distribution, rather they prefer a safe environment for their advertisement," says Hung, the publisher of the independent fashion magazine. It is reported that "fashion labels are putting even more money into advertising in China than in the States." Vogue magazine is already an internationally well-known publication, which makes advertisers feel safe placing their advertisements in their magazines. There is a large competition to get advertisements in magazines. "When Vogue came and took away some of the others' advertising income, Trends Media Group, who publishes Harper's Bazaar and Cosmopolitan, reported Vogue for a "minor regulatory technicality," which forced Vogue to move its whole editorial staff from Shanghai to Beijing." Magazines fight each other over advertisers because they are a large source of profit. However, since there is no third party auditing system in China, it is unclear whether high profile magazines such as Vogue are profitable because of their distribution sales or the advertisements that they feature. "In a fair market environment, our niche distribution will not seem so distant from the bloated distribution figures of the giants," said Hung, a publisher of the independent fashion magazine iLook.

== Editions ==
- Men's Vogue (from 2008 to 2012)
- Vogue Me (from 2016 to 2021)
- Vogue Film (since 2017)
- Vogue+ (since 2021)
- Vogue Beauty Paper (since 2021)
- Vogue Man (since 2025)
- Vogue Collections (closed)
- Vogue Bridal (closed)

== See also ==
- List of Vogue China cover models
