= Elite Model Look =

Fashion modeling event

- Genre: Model search competition
- Frequency: Annually
- Inaugurated: 1983
- Website: elitemodellook.com

Elite Model Look (formerly known as Look of the Year from 1983 to 1995) is a yearly fashion modeling event held by Elite Model Management, an international model management group. It is used to discover and launch female fashion models in the international fashion marketplace, like the similar Ford Models' Supermodel of the World contest. Each year the contest attracts some 350,000 participants from roughly 70 countries in the world, with castings held in over 800 cities. Contestants, between the ages of 14 and 26, compete in local contests for a chance to represent their country in the world final.

Notable past contestants include Laurie Holden, Alessandra Ambrosio, Ana Beatriz Barros, Cindy Crawford, Helena Christensen, Dayana Mendoza, Melania Trump, Sofia Vergara, Olga Kurylenko, Diane Kruger, Esther Cañadas, Fernanda Tavares, Frederique van der Wal, Gisele Bündchen, Inés Rivero, Isabeli Fontana, Kate Dillon Levin, Lara Stone, Juana Burga, Petra Němcová, Stephanie Seymour, Tatjana Patitz, Ujjwala Raut, Manasvi Mamgai, Azra Akin, Miriam Odemba, Andrea Escobar and Rolene Strauss.

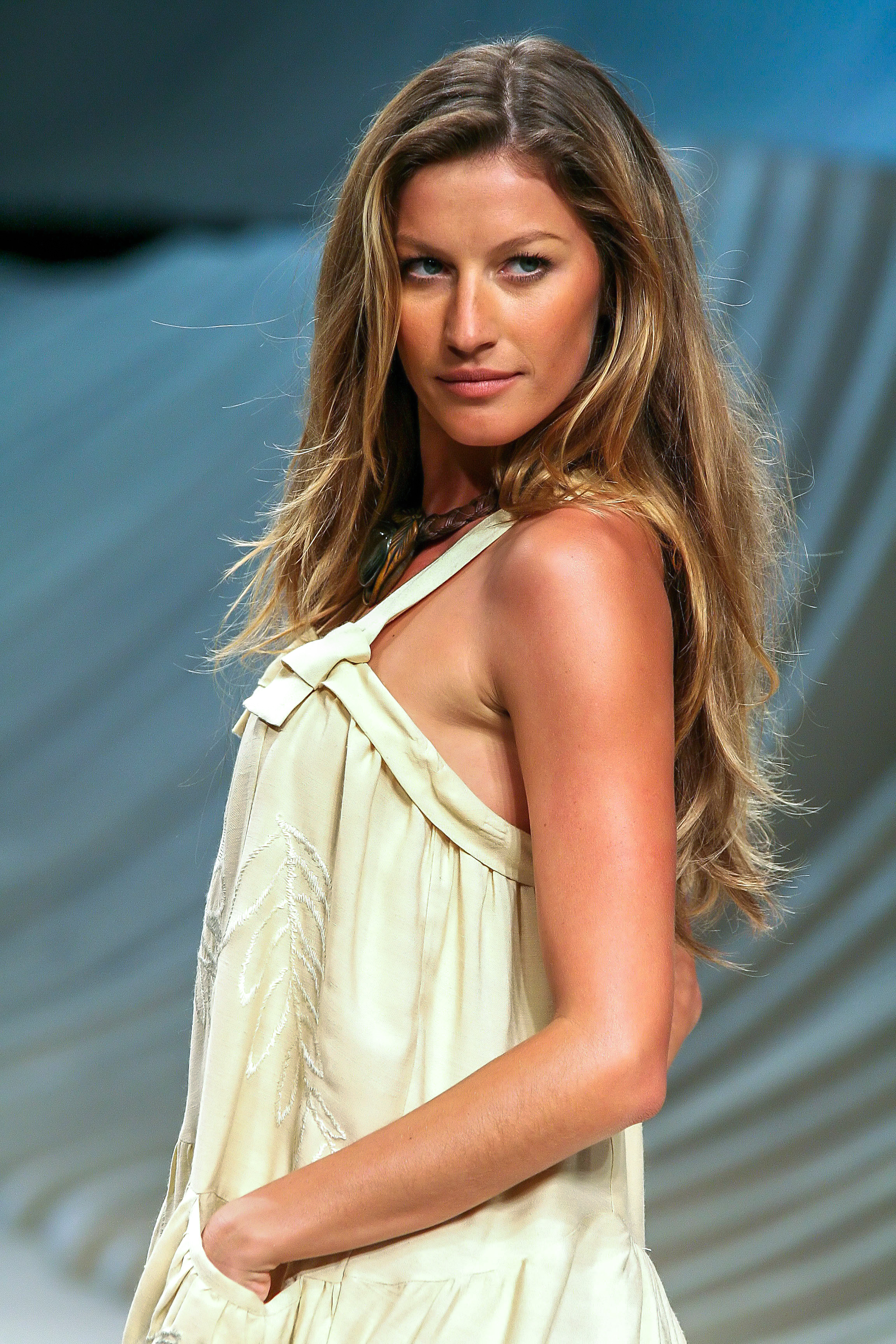
Gisele Bündchen competed in the world final of Elite Model Look in 1994, where she made the Top 15, but ultimately did not win.

From 1996 to 1999 the United States finals were recorded to make a television documentary special called The Making of a Supermodel, which aired on E! Entertainment Television. Online, a streaming television documentary titled Elite New Face premiered on Hulu on November 19, 2012. The series reviewed the 2011 contest, and followed the 2012 contest beginning from the regional castings all the way to the world final and the announcement of the winner. A second season following the 2013 event was also created.

== The contest ==
The search is open to beginning models, with the contest's mission stated as being "providing the opportunity for young girls to enter the fashion world, become models and go on to have fabulous careers" and "to discover the new talents who will become the next top models."

Contestants between the ages of 14 and 26 years are eligible to compete. Females should meet a minimum height requirement of 1.72 meters, or 5'8". Males should meet a minimum height requirement of 1.88 meters, or 6'2". Until 2014, males were only allowed to participate in national finals, with females competing in the world final.

Each country taking part in the contest selects semi-finalists in various cities who compete to become national finalists. The winners of each national contest compete together in the world final. The winners are selected based on their photogenic abilities, personality, natural beauty, and potential to fit into current fashion trends. The world final lasts two weeks, during which the finalists participate in various workshops. These include highlighting natural beauty with make-up and hair professionals, photo shoots, rehearsals for the final show, and individual interviews with members of the jury and Elite's agents.

During the final show fifteen winners are selected by a jury, and are awarded worldwide contracts with Elite Model Management. The top three contestants are offered contracts with a guaranteed remuneration.

=== Titleholders ===
Held	Winner	Country	Date of birth	Age	Notable participants	Reference
November 19, 1983	Lisa Hollenbeck	United States	1968-1-1	15	Cindy Crawford, Tatjana Patitz, Stephanie Seymour, Hunter Reno, Deborah Falconer, Jacqueline de la Vega, Claudia Ferrabraz, Martha Eugenia Ortíz, Illana Diamant, Gaby Chiarini, Monica Gripman, Ljiljana Tica, Hólmfríður Karlsdóttir (Iceland Finals), Anna Margret Jónsdóttir (Iceland Finals)	
June 27, 1985	Frederique van der Wal	Netherlands	1967-8-30	17	Laurie Holden - (Canada nationals)	
September 15, 1986	Maria Lindkvist	Sweden	1972-1-30	14	Karen Mulder	
September 4, 1987	Debbie Chin	United States	1969-8-26	18	Helena Christensen	
September 15, 1988	Kelley Browne	United States	1973	15	Philippa Lett, Kate Fischer, Catherine McCord, Michele Chalupka, Meghan Douglas, Cynthia Pinot, Maria Patricia Betita - (Philippines finals)	
September 4, 1989	Inés Sastre	Spain	1973-11-21	15	Natasha Henstridge	
September 12, 1990	Wendy Veldhuis	Netherlands	1971-8-26	19	Georgina Grenville, Ivana Miličević, Lauren Santo Domingo, Ingrid Vandebosch, Yulia Lemigova - (USSR castings)	
September 4, 1991	Ingrid Seynhaeve	Belgium	1973-6-28	18	Jennipher Rodriguez, Kate Dillon Levin, Yvonne Voni Delfos, Tamara Sedmak, Natasha Stefanenko - (USSR finals)	
September 15, 1992	Mariann Molski	United States	1976-9-24	15	Sofia Vergara, Ruffa Gutierrez, Diane Heidkrüger, Marta Cecchetto, Oxana Zubakova, Eugenia Silva, Nieves Álvarez, Aline Wermelinger, Amit Machtinger, Lee So-ra, Melania Knauss - (Slovenia finals), Esther Cañadas - (Spain Finals)	
September 11, 1993	Heidi Albertsen	Denmark	1976-9-1	17	Tatiana Zavialova, Inés Rivero, Ashley Scott, María Alejandra Márquez, Inna Zobova - (Russia finals)	
September 10, 1994	Natalia Semanova	Russia	1979-10-1	14	Gisele Bündchen, Kristanna Loken, Sheetal Mallar, Ainsley McWha, Tatiana Nikiforova, Fabiana Saba, Kerry Bohm, Claudia Zanella, Sophie Winters, Flavia Mantovan, Elenoire Casalegno, Nina Georgalas, Sandra Maidana	
August 20, 1995	Sandra Wagner	Switzerland	1978-1-1	17	Irina Bondarenko, Emma B, Eihi Shiina, Lee Sun-Jin, Tracy Trinita, Carolina Magalhães, Joseane Oliveira, Isabelle Darras, Zoya Sakr, Tamara Henriksen, Alessandra Ambrosio - (Brazil finals), Caroline Ribeiro - (Brazil finals)	
September 7, 1996	Diana Kovalchuk	Ukraine	1982-2-23	14	Ana Beatriz Barros, Isabeli Fontana, Katia Zygouli, Michelle Alves, Nina Morić, Petra Němcová, Ujjwala Raut, Nataša Vojnović, Jill McCormick, Olga Otrokhova, Kristina Rostad, Tarina Young, Lauren Bowles, Olga Kurylenko - (Russia nationals), Anna Azarova - (Russia nationals)	
September 16, 1997	Yfke Sturm	Netherlands	1981-11-19	15	Franziska Knuppe, Juliana Martins, Viera Schottertova, Sedef Avci, Soraia Chaves, Elizabeth Perfoll	
September 17, 1998	Alina Puscau	Romania	1982-4-7	16	Azra Akin, Mara Darmousli, Tatiana Kovylina, Mia Rosing, Linda Nývltová, Sandra Seifert, Ksenia Agafonova, Miranda Slabber - (Netherlands finals).	
September 11, 1999	Vika Sementsova	Ukraine	1985-7-2	14	Marie-José Hnein, Helen Lindes, Victoria Lopyreva - (Russia regionals), Karishma Modi, Paloma Moreno, Kate Nauta, Raica Oliveira, Miriam Odemba, Gamze Özçelik, Maria del Mar Rosario, Lara Stone, Kuku Trinidad - (Philippines finals),	
September 9, 2000	Linda Vojtová	Czech Republic	1985-6-22	15	Lourdes Arévalos, Alena Martanovicova, Arantxa Santamaria, Renata Klem, Joana Santos, Eszter Tóth, Dinna Olivia, Desirée Pallotta, Valentina Zelyaeva - (Russia nationals).	
September 8, 2001	Rianne ten Haken	Netherlands	1986-5-7	15	Dayana Mendoza, Renata Ruiz, Emina Cunmulaj, Tracy Ip, Schynaider Moura, Femke Lakenmann, Bonny Bige Chen, Olga Elnikova, Irina Shadrina, Valentina Zelyaeva - (Russia nationals), Milana Keller - (Russia finals).	
September 7, 2002	Ana Mihajlovic	Serbia and Montenegro	1987-5-20	15	Kenza Fourati, Ximena Huilipán, Enikő Mihalik, Ingrid Kelly, Tuğçe Kazaz, Dafne Molina - (Mexico finals).	
November 8, 2003	Denisa Dvončová	Slovakia	1988-4-30	15	May Akerman, Charlott Cordes, Chiara Baschetti, Karina Rivero, Paula Verhoeven, Hanna Verboom, Rojane Fradique, May J - (Japan Finals).	
December 2, 2004	Sofie Oosterwaal	Netherlands	1990-7-17	14	Carolina Morán, Sofia Bruscoli, Vanessa Ceruti, Danijela Dimitrovska, Michaela Hlaváčková, Michaela Kocianova, Emma Ahlund, Inna Serpukhovitina, Svetlana Sergienko, Ria Bolivar, Jessica Amornkuldilok - (Thailand finals).	
November 5, 2005	Charlotte Di Calypso	France	1990-12-9	14	Julia "Juju" Ivanyuk, Johanna Jonsson, Alba Riquelme, Hoàng Khánh Ngọc, Malena Costa Sjögren - (Spain finals), Helen Nicolette Henson - (Philippines finals).	
February 10, 2007	Denisa Dvořáková	Czech Republic	1989-5-28	17	Constance Jablonski, Mirka Michlíková, Ronja Furrer, Ioana Boitor, Manasvi Mamgai, Sigrid Agren, Zivanna Letisha Siregar, Arlenis Sosa - (Dominican Republic finals), Natasha Domínguez - (Venezuela nationals)], María José Gallego.	
April 21, 2008	Jennifer Messelier	France	1991-4-23	16	Rolene Strauss, Tamar Shedania, Adama Diallo, Dorothea Barth Jorgensen, Hana Jiříčková, Juana Burga Cervera, Noelia López, Ymre Stiekema, Edsa Ramírez, Kristy Agapiou, Sofia Rudieva - (Russia nationals).	
November 1, 2008	Louise Maselis	Belgium	1993-3-28	15	Fei Fei Sun, Cora Emmanuel, Josefina Cisternas, Cynthia de la Vega, Jessica Duarte, Angela Ruiz - (Venezuela finals).	
October 18, 2009	Julia Saner	Switzerland	1992-2-19	17	Caterina Ravaglia, Emily Smith, Ming Xi, Nyasha Matonhodze, Simona Andrejic, Caterina Ravaglia - (Italy finals), Livia Rangel - (Mexico finals)	
October 10, 2010	Karolina Tolkachova	Ukraine	1992-2-18	18	Erjona Ala, Hou Meng Die, Lucette van Beek, Roberta Narciso, Maria Borges - (Angola finals), Camille Cerf - (France nationals), Dulcita Lieggi - (Dominican Republic finals).	
December 6, 2011	Julia Schneider	Sweden	1996-1-1	15	Lenka Hanakova, Lieve Dannau, Amra Cerkezovic, Lera Kvasovka, Joséphine Le Tutour, Li Xiao Xing, Pauline Hoarau, Lieke van Houten, Nguyễn Thị Tuyết Lan, Dhio Moreno - (Dominican Republic finals)	
December 1, 2012	Marilhéa Léa Peillard	France	1994-11-16	18	Trinidad de la Noi, Manuela Frey, Ysaunny Brito, Alecia Morais, Diana Croce, Cassandra Chery, Daniela Álvarez - (Mexico finals), Vittoria Ceretti - (Italy finals)	
November 27, 2013	Eva Klímková	Czech Republic	1997-10-12	16	Amilna Estêvão, Estelle Chen, Anita Zet, Viktoria Machajdik, Sunniva Halkjelsvik, Barbora Kolarikova, May Bell, Cassandra Chery, Eden Bristowe, Luba Hryniv, Anastasia Kostenko - (Russia castings)	
December 2, 2014	Barbora Podzimková ♀	Czech Republic	1999-9-9	15	Laura Strantz, Alexandra Micu, Selma Hadziosmanovic, Greta Varlese, María Romina Trotto Morales, Awa Sanoko, Vijaya Sharma, Đặng Thị Lệ Hằng, Irina Đuranović, Mayowa Nicholas, Alena Lyashenko, Yasmin Wijnaldum	
December 2, 2014	James Richard Parker ♂	Italy	1995-12-6	18	Serge Rigvava, Raphael Hatt, Jeong Woo Kim, Josef Utekal, Eduard Michalko, Aitor Andueza	
November 23, 2015	Anouk Thijssen ♀	Netherlands	2000-7-4	15	Chiara Leone, Aneta Měšťanová, Charlotte Corn, Matilde Rastelli, Annabella Bihari, Léia Matagne, María Almenta	
November 23, 2015	Tristan Tymen ♂	France	1995-8-21	20	Kristian Černík, Hsu Chen, Angelo Amirante, Benjamin Aston	
Elite Model Look International 2016November 23, 2016	Jana Tvrdikova ♀	Czech Republic	2000-12-20	15	Katya Bybina, Cosima Lagae, Zara Bicha, Alina Dementieva, Amanda Denis, Holly Magson	
Elite Model Look International 2016November 23, 2016	Davidson Obennebo ♂	Nigeria	1996-3-17	20	Etienne Robert, Gideon Yendell	
November 29, 2017	Valeria Chenskaya ♀	Russia	2002-9-6	15	Mona Tougaard	
November 29, 2017	Antonio Freitas ♂	Brazil	Unknown	17	Mona Tougaard	
August 30, 2018	Wen Di ♀	China	Unknown	17		
August 30, 2018	Maksim Krintser ♂	Russia	Unknown	17		
November 18, 2019	Yireh Fernanda Carrasco ♀	Dominican Republic	Unknown	16		
November 18, 2019	Laetitia Ky ♀	Côte d'Ivoire	1996	23		
November 18, 2019	Andrej Chamula ♂	Slovakia	Unknown	19		
January 31, 2021	Mika Reins ♀	Philippines	Unknown	21		
January 31, 2021	Lola Pierré ♀	France	Unknown	16		
January 31, 2021	Jack Jerry ♂	USA	1997-2-12	23		
January 31, 2021	Salvatore Corallo ♂	Italy	Unknown	16		
August 30, 2022	Majda John Peter ♀	South Sudan	Unknown	17	Sara Caballero, Ali Dansky	
August 30, 2022	Sergi Shan ♂	Spain	Unknown	19	Sara Caballero, Ali Dansky	
June 15, 2024	Micklate Macobola ♀	Mozambique	Unknown	20		
June 15, 2024	Imade Darouache ♂	Italy	Unknown	21		

- No event was held in 1984, 2006, 2023, or 2025.

=== Participating nations and regions ===
The following is a list of countries or regions that have participated in the Elite Model Look contest

North America

- Canada
- US
- Mexico

Central America

- Costa Rica
- Panama

Caribbean

- Antigua and Barbuda
- Bahamas
- Curacao
- Dominican Republic
- Haiti
- Puerto Rico
- Saint Vincent and the Grenadines
- Trinidad & Tobago
- St. Maarten

South America

- Argentina
- Bolivia
- Brazil
- Chile
- Colombia
- Ecuador
- Paraguay
- Peru
- Uruguay
- Venezuela

Europe

- Armenia
- Austria
- Belarus
- Belgium
- Bosnia and Herzegovina
- Czech Republic
- Denmark
- Estonia
- Finland
- France
- Georgia
- Germany
- Hungary
- Iceland
- Ireland
- Italy
- Kazakhstan
- Kosovo
- Latvia
- Lithuania
- Luxembourg
- Moldova
- Monaco
- Montenegro
- Netherlands
- Poland
- Portugal
- Romania
- Russia
- Serbia
- Serbia & Montenegro
- Slovakia
- Slovenia
- Soviet Union
- Spain
- Sweden
- Switzerland
- Turkey
- United Kingdom
- Yugoslavia

Africa

- Algeria
- Angola
- Cameroon
- Cape Verde
- Central African Republic
- Equatorial Guinea
- Gabon
- Côte d'Ivoire
- Kenya
- Mauritius
- Morocco
- Mozambique
- Nigeria
- Republic of the Congo
- Réunion
- Senegal
- South Africa
- Tanzania
- Tunisia
- Zimbabwe

Asia

- China
- Hong Kong
- India
- Indonesia
- Iran
- Israel
- Japan
- Lebanon
- Malaysia
- Philippines
- Qatar
- Singapore
- South Korea
- Taiwan
- Thailand
- United Arab Emirates
- Vietnam

Oceania

- Australia
- French Polynesia
- New Caledonia
- New Zealand

=== Hosts ===
Year	Hosts
1988	George Hamilton
1991	Donald Trump
1992	Donald Trump
1993	Ingrid Seynhaeve
1994	Carol Alt & Marcus Schenkenberg
1996	Ines Rivero, Linda Hardy & Frédéric Mitterrand
1998	Valeria Mazza
1999	Ingrid Seynhaeve
2001	Chantal Bolivar
2003	Ashley Scott
2007	Chantal Bolivar
2011	Nikki Reed

== See also ==
- Elite Model Look Chile
- Elite Model Look India
- Elite Model Look Serbia
- Elite Model Look Vietnam
- Elite Model Management
- Ford Models Supermodel of the World
- Got Talent
- Miss Supertalent
- American Idol
- Miss Universe
