= Elite Model Look Serbia =

Elite Model Look Serbia is an annual fashion modeling contest held by Models Inc. since 2012. The winner of the title takes it for one year, taking part later in Elite Model Look international contest.

== Titleholders ==
=== EML Serbia for Elite Model Look International ===
Year	Contestant	Ranking	Location
1996	Nataša Vojnović	Top 15	Nice, France
1997	Nevena Miličević	Non-Finalist	Nice, France
1998	Marina Bukvić	Top 15	Nice, France
1999	Aleksandra Vukovic	1st Runner-up (Tie)	Nice, France
2000	Mirjana Lazić	Top 15	Geneva, Switzerland
2001	Dušanka Stanojević	Non-Finalist	Nice, France
2001	Emina Cunmulaj	Top 15	Nice, France
2002	Ana Mihajlovic	Winner	Tunis, Tunisia
2002	Marija Mićunović	Top 15	Tunis, Tunisia
2003	Dubravka Matović	Non-Finalist	Singapore
2003	Jelena Stožnić	Top 15	Singapore
2004	Danijela Dimitrovska	Non-Finalist	Shanghai, China
2004	Sanja Brnović	Non-Finalist	Shanghai, China
2005	Dijana Nikolić	Top 15	Shanghai, China
2005	Vanja Jošić	Non-Finalist	Shanghai, China
2006	Nevena Gičević	Non-Finalist	Marrakesh, Morocco
2006	Vladica Mijatovic	Non-Finalist	Marrakesh, Morocco
2007	Kristina Stefanović	Top 15	Prague, Czech Republic
2008	Jovana Kovačević	Non-Finalist	Sanya, China
2009	Simona Andrejić	Top 15	Sanya, China
2010	Katarina Lukić	Non-Finalist	Shanghai, China
2011	Barbara Tatalović	Non-Finalist	Shanghai, China
2012	Marta Milanović	Non-Finalist	Shanghai, China
2013	Sandra Balaban	Non-Finalist	Shenzhen, China
2014	Kristina Kusic	Non-Finalist	Shenzhen, China
2015	Tanja Doncic	Non-Finalist	Milan, Italy
