= Dipti =

Dipti is a given name. Notable people with the name include:

- Dipti Mehta, Indian American actress
- Dipti Saravanamuttu (born 1960), Sri Lankan-Australian poet
- Dipti Sharma, Indian fashion model
- Dipti Srinivasan, Singaporean electrical engineer
