= Elite Model Look India =

- Predecessor: Femina Look of the Year
- Formation: 2004
- Type: Model Search Contest
- Headquarters: Mumbai
- Location: India
- Members: Elite Model Look
- Official language: Hindi, English
- License Owner: Marc Robinson
- Key people: Vasanth Kumar; Victoria Da Silva
- Parent organisation: Max Fashion
- Website: www.elitemodellook.com/in/

Elite Model Look India is an annual modelling contest held in India since 2004. The winner of the event represents India at Elite Model Look, an International modelling contest .

== History ==
Sheetal Mallar from Mumbai was the first winner of Femina Look of the Year contest and was the first one to represent India at Elite Model Look contest in 1994. She was among the Top 15 finalist at the Elite Model Look 1994. Other notable winners of Femina Look of the Year include Ujjwala Raut, Carol Gracias, and Nethra Raghuraman.

== 2004–2012 Event ==
Elite Model Management launched in India in 2003 by Sushma Puri. In 2004, she sent two models to compete at Elite Model Look, Vibhinita Verma and Sucheta Sharma. In 2006 L'Oreal Paris with Elite Model Management India did a nationwide contest telecast on Zoom where Manasvi Mamgai was announced winner she went on to participate in Elite Model Look 2006 in Marrakesh.

== 2014–present ==
Since 2014, MAX India organises the event under the license owner Marc Robinson. The MAX Elite Model Look 2014 finale was held in Mumbai on October 12, 2014, the winners represented India the Elite Model Look 2014 contest held in China. Former Femina Miss India Supranational Vijaya Sharma of New Delhi and Rinku Malik of New Delhi were declared winners of the event.

== Indian representatives to Elite Model Look Contest ==
Winner	'Runner up	Finalist/Semifinalist	Unplaced

=== Female Representatives ===
- The following women have represented India at Elite Model Look contest.

Year	Winner	Age	Height	Hometown	Placement at Elite Model Look
1994	Sheetal Mallar	19	1.78 m (5 ft 10 in)	Mumbai	Top 15
1995	Charmaine Shackleton	18	1.79 m (5 ft 10 1/2 in)	Goa	Unplaced
1996	Ujjwala Raut	17	1.78 m (5 ft 10 in)	Mumbai	Top 15
1997	Nethra Raghuraman	20	1.76 m (5 ft 9 1/2 in)	Gujarat	Unplaced
1998	Carol Gracias	19	1.80 m (5 ft 11 in)	Mumbai	Unplaced
1999	Karishma Modi	18	1.78 m (5 ft 10 in)	Gujarat	Unplaced
2004	Suchtra Sharma	18	1.77 m (5 ft 9 1/2 in)	New Delhi	Unplaced
2004	Vibhinita Verma	17	1.76 m (5 ft 9 1/2 in)	Bangalore	Top 20
2006	Manasvi Mamgai	16	1.78 m (5 ft 10 in)	New Delhi	Unplaced
2008	Prerana Sharma	18	1.75 m (5 ft 9 in)	New Delhi	Unplaced
2009	Erika Packard	20	1.79 m (5 ft 10 1/2 in)	Mumbai	Unplaced
2010	Arshia Ahuja	19	1.76 m (5 ft 9 1/2 in)	Punjab	Unplaced
2011	Archana Kumar	23	1.75 m (5 ft 9 in)	New Delhi	Top 15
2012	Dayana	21	1.78 m (5 ft 10 in)	Bangalore	Unplaced
2014	Vijaya Sharma	22	1.75 m (5 ft 9 in)	New Delhi	Unplaced
2015	Dipti Sharma	20	1.80 m (5 ft 11 in)	Chandigarh	Unplaced

==== Winners Notes ====
- Dipti Sharma was a finalist at Campus Princess 2015.
- Vijaya Sharma was Asian Supermodel 2012-2nd Runner Up and Femina Miss India Supranational 2013, later represented India at Miss Supranational 2013 and was among the top 20 semifinalists.
- Dayana was a finalist at the Femina Miss India 2011 contest.
- Manasvi Mamgai later won Miss Tourism International 2008 and Femina Miss India in 2010 and is now a Bollywood actress.

=== Male Representatives ===
- The following men have represented India at Elite Model Look contest.

Year	Winner	Age	Height	Hometown	Placement at Elite Model Look
2016	Siddharth Puranik	22	1.79 m (5 ft 10 1/2 in)	Raipur	Unplaced
2015	Pranav Patidar	21	1.91 m (6 ft 3 in)	Rajasthan	Unplaced
2014	Rinku Malik	21	1.89 m (6 ft 2 1/2 in)	New Delhi	Unplaced

== Gallery ==
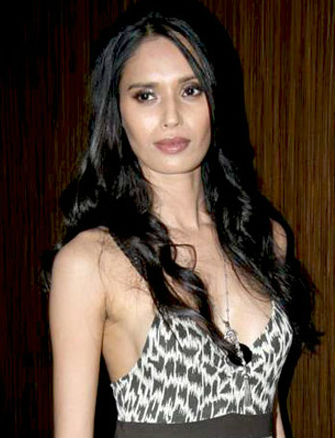
Ujjwala Raut, Winner 1996

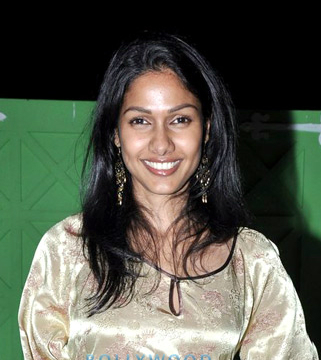
Nethra Raghuraman, Winner 1997

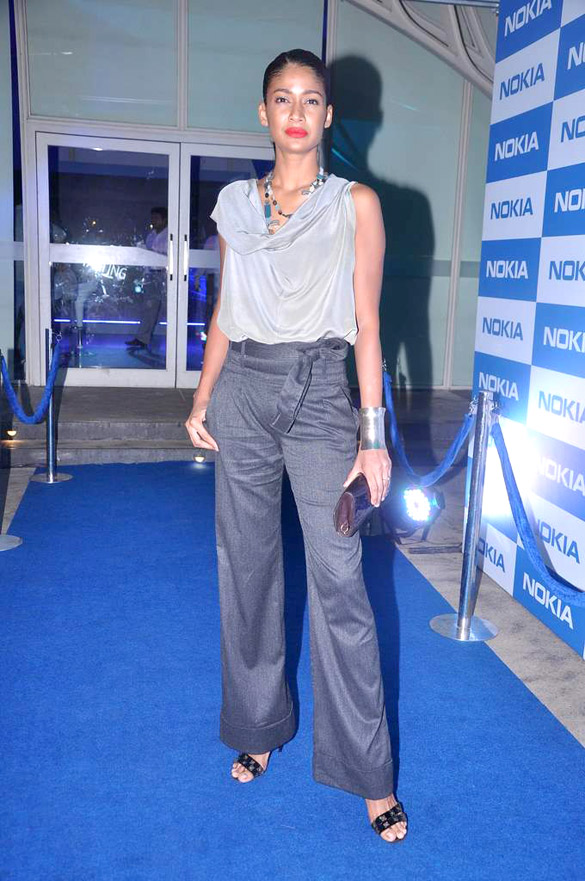
Carol Gracias, Winner 1998

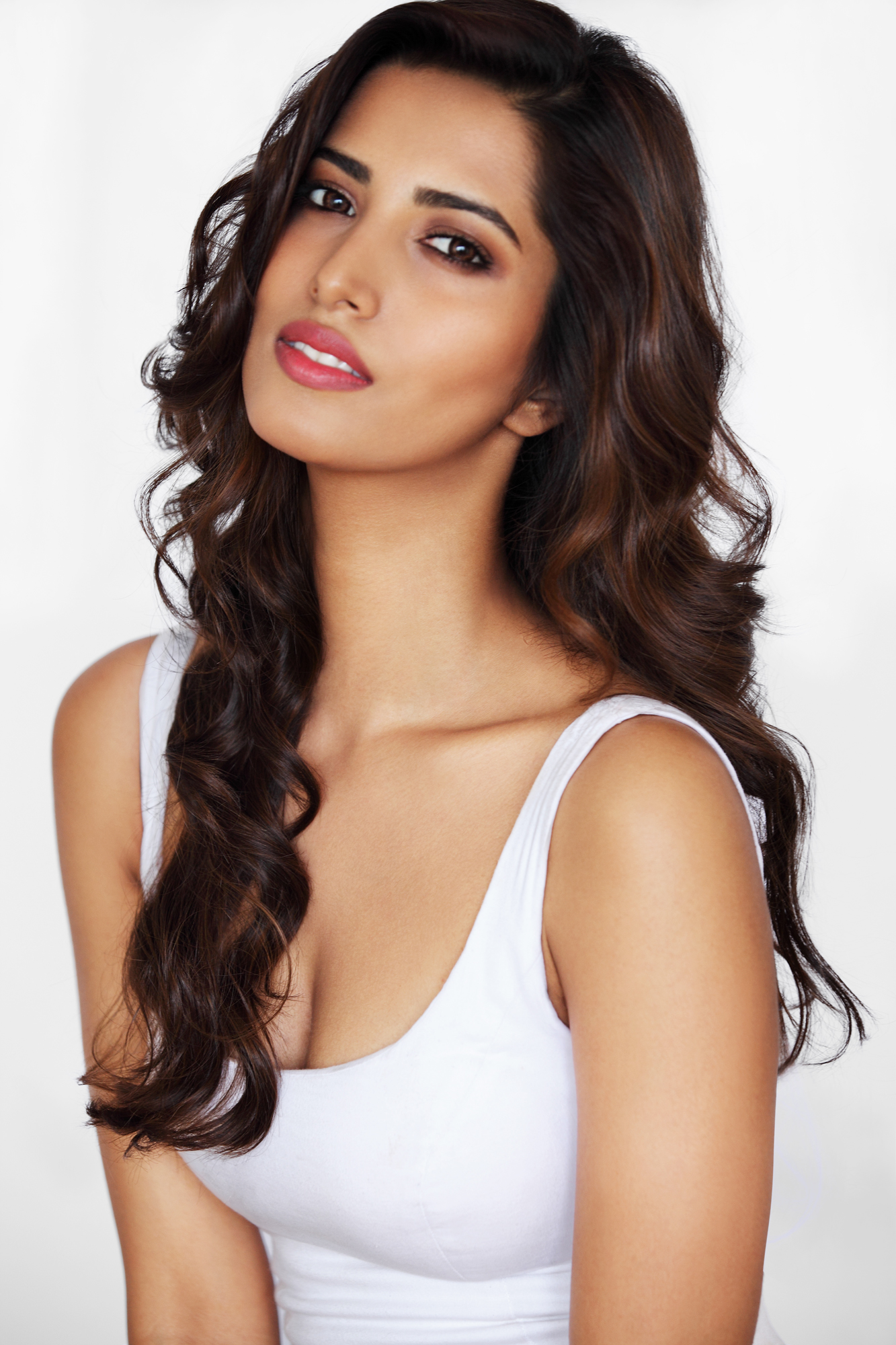
Manasvi Mamgai, Winner 2006
