= Elite Model Look Chile =

Annual fashion modeling event in Chile

Elite Model Look Chile is an annual fashion modeling event held by Elite Model Chile Management since 1997. The winner of the title takes it for one year, taking part later in Elite Model Look international contest. The first runner-up goes to Elite Model Look Latino. The selection of the delegates is realized in "scoutings" in different cities of Chile.

== Titleholders ==
=== EML Chile for Elite Model Look International ===
Year	Contestant	Ranking	Location
1997	Carolina Ruiz	Top 30	Nice, France
1998	Karen Bravo	Non-Finalist	Nice, France
1999	Paloma Moreno	Top 12	Nice, France
1999	Caterina Jadresic	Non-Finalist	Nice, France
2000	Eva Siebert	Non-Finalist	Geneva, Switzerland
2001	Renata Ruiz	1st Runner-up	Nice, France
2002	Ximena Huilipán	Non-Finalist	Tunis, Tunisia
2003	Roberta Hinrichsen	Non-Finalist	Singapore
2004	Vanessa Ceruti	Non-Finalist	Shanghai, China
2005	María Alicia Hernández	Non-Finalist	Shanghai, China
2006	Catalina Barra	Top 15	Marrakech, Morocco
2006	Xamira Zuloaga	Top 15	Marrakech, Morocco
2007	Sofía Izquierdo	Non-Finalist	Prague, Czech Republic
2008	Josefina Cisternas	1st Runner-up	Sanya, China
2009	María Teresa Stange	Non-Finalist	Sanya, China
2010	Augusta Davanzo	Non-Finalist	Shanghai, China
2010	Chris Frohlich	Non-Finalist	Shanghai, China
2011	Lieve Dannau	2nd Runner-up	Shanghai, China
2012	Trinidad de la Noi	1st Runner-up	Shanghai, China
2013	Catalina Chadwick	Non-Finalist	Shenzhen, China
2014	Elna Petrowitsch	Non-Finalist	Shenzhen, China
2015	Chiara Leone	1st Runner-up (Girls)	Milan, Italy
2016	Antonia Montealegre	Non-Finalist (Social Media Winner)	Lisbon, Portugal
2017	Victoria Moretti	Non-Finalist	Milan, Italy
2017	Germán Cuevas	Non-Finalist	Milan, Italy
2018	Camila Fosk	Top 15	Lisbon, Portugal
2019	Macarena Cannoni	Non-Finalist	Paris, France

=== EML Chile for Elite Model Look Latino ===
Year	Contestant	Ranking
1999	Caterina Jadresic	—N/a
2004	Josefina Montané	—N/a
2005	Mariela Morán	—N/a
2006	Xamira Zuloaga	Winner
2007	Catherine Sosemann	—N/a
2008	María Teresa Stange	—N/a

== Notable past contestants ==
- Bernardita Zúñiga
- Carolina de Moras
- Javiera Díaz de Valdés
- Fernanda Figueroa
