= Juliana Martins =

Juliana Martins may refer to:

- Juliana Martins (model) (born 1984), Brazilian model
- Juliana Martins (actress) (born 1974), Brazilian actress
