= Frachon =

Frachon is a surname. Notable people with the surname include:

- Alain Frachon (born 1950), French journalist
- Benoît Frachon (1893–1975), French metalworker and trade union leader
- Mathilde Julia Frachon (born 1992), French fashion model
