= Marilhéa Léa Peillard =

French model

Marilhéa Peillard
- Born: Léa Peillard; 16 November 1994 (age 31)
- Modeling information
- Height: 181 cm (5 ft 11 in)
- Hair color: Brown
- Eye color: Brown
- Agency: Elite Model Management (2012-2015)

Marilhéa Peillard (born Léa Peillard, November 16, 1994, in Dienville) is a French model.

== Biography ==
While studying art history at the School of Fine Arts of Dijon, Peillard presented herself to the Elite Model Look contest in 2012. She changed her first name, in order to stand out from other girls also named Léa. One of several hundred candidates, she won the French contest before going on to win the international final in Shanghai. She signed a contract for a three-year engagement with Elite Model Management, and relocated to New York.

After her victory, she posed for Elle. She has modelled for Maybelline, Eres, Stradivarius, Maxim, Urban Outfitters and Victoria's Secret.

In 2017, she made her film debut with a small role in Luc Besson's Valerian and the City of a Thousand Planets.

== Filmography ==
- 2017 : Valerian and the City of a Thousand Planets (as Tsûuri)
