= Eva Klímková =

Czech model

- Born: 12 October 1997 (age 28); Prague, Czech Republic
- Occupation: Model
- Modeling information
- Height: 5 ft 10 in (1.78 m)
- Hair color: Brown
- Eye color: Blue
- Agency: The Society Management (New York); Elite Model Management (Paris, Milan, London, Barcelona); Model Management (Hamburg); Munich Models (Munich)

Eva Klímková is a Czech model and winner of the contest Elite Model Look Czech Republic and also the international contest Elite Model Look International 2013.

Awards and achievements
| Preceded by Marilhéa Peillard; France | Elite Model Look; 2013 | Succeeded by Barbora Podzimkova; Czech Republic |
