= Denisa Dvořáková =

Czech model

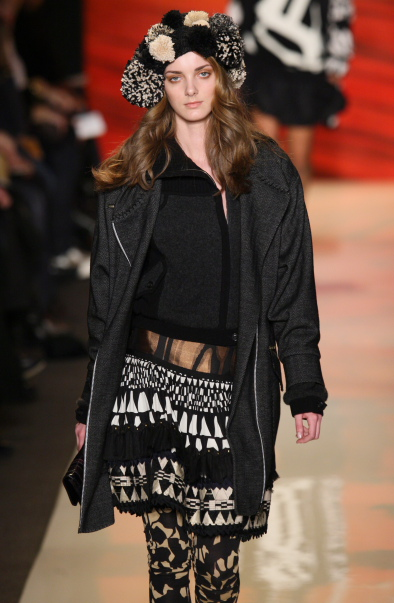
- Dvořáková in Diane von Furstenberg Fall 2009
- Born: 28 May 1989 (age 37); Prague, Czech Republic
- Modelling information
- Height: 5 ft 9.5 in (1.77 m)
- Hair colour: Light Brown
- Eye colour: Blue/Green
- Agency: Supreme Management (New York); Elite Model Management (Paris, London, Amsterdam, Barcelona, Copenhagen, Toronto); Why Not Model Management (Milan); Model Management (Hamburg); Munich Models (Munich); MP Stockholm (Stockholm); Vivien's Model Management - Sydney (Sydney); Dolls Model Management (Taipei); Donna Models (Tokyo)

Denisa Dvořáková (born 28 May 1991) is a Czech model, who is best known as the winner of the Elite Model Look 2006.

== Early life ==
Denisa was born in Prague, Czech Republic.

== Career ==
Dvořáková's career started when she attended a scouting for new models in Prague in 2005. She signed a contract with the Czech branch of the Elite Models agency, and within a few months she was walking for Prada in Milan, and Dior, Chanel and Chloé in Paris.

Dvořáková entered and was crowned the winner of the Elite Model Look competition in 2006, aged 16. She has been on the cover of Vogue Italia and Dazed & Confused, and has walked the runway for designers including Versace, Chanel, Karl Lagerfeld, Fendi, Christian Dior, John Galliano, and Valentino.
