= María Almenta =

Spanish model

- Born: María Garcia-Almenta Poole; 26 March 1997 (age 29); Madrid, Spain
- Education: Charles III University of Madrid
- Occupation: Model
- Years active: 2016–present
- Modeling information
- Height: 5 ft 10 in (1.78 m)
- Hair color: Brown
- Eye color: Brown
- Agency: Elite Model Management

María Garcia-Almenta Poole (born 26 March 1997), better known as Maria Almenta, is a Spanish model and winner of the contest of the Elite Model Look Spain 2015 and she belonged to the Top 10 Girls in the international contest of Elite, after 26 years, when Inés Sastre won the contest in 1989.
