= Elite Model Look International 2013 =

- Date: November 27, 2013
- Entertainment: Krasp
- Venue: Shenzhen, China
- Entrants: 54
- Debuts: Bahamas, United Arab Emirates & Qatar
- Withdrawals: Algeria, Argentina, Australia, Bosnia & Herzegovina, Cape Verde, Costa Rica, Dominican Republic, Equatorial Guinea, India, Indonesia, Korea, Latvia, Lithuania, Mozambique, Saint Vincent and the Grenadines, Singapore, Zimbabwe
- Returns: Republic of China, Equatorial Guinea, Hungary, New Zealand, Norway, Monaco, South Africa
- Winner: Eva Klímková from Czech Republic

Elite Model Look International 2013 was held on November 27, 2013, in Shenzhen, China. The winner of the title was Eva Klimkova of the Czech Republic, announced by Malgosia Bela, Liu Wen and Elite Model Look 2005 Charlotte Di Calypso.

== Placements ==
Final results	Contestant
Elite Model Look 2013	Czech Republic - Eva Klímková
1st Runner-up	Monaco - Alexandra Tyga
2nd Runner-up	Angola - Amilna Estevão / Hungary - Dalma Baczay
Top 15	Austria - Viktoria Machajdik; Denmark - Filippa Rye Rønhof; France - Estelle Chen; Norway - Sunniva Halkjelsvik; USA - Kaylin Rogers; Russia - Anita Zaporotskova; Romania - Patricia Paty; Slovakia - Barbora Kolarikova; Germany - Gina Bilinski; Poland - Iga Estkowska; Great Britain - May Constance Bell

== Contestants ==
Country	Contestant	Height (m)	Age	Measurements
Angola	Amilna Estêvão	1.79	14	77-60-83
Armenia	Nelli Sayadyan	1.78	21	86-61-90
Austria	Viktoria Machajdik	1.78	17	78-59-89
Bahamas	Shavon Hailey Nottage	1.83	17	82-63-86
Belgium	Elise Van Rompaey	1.80	16	77-66-89
Brazil	Beatriz Grander	1.79	16	80-60-87
Brazil	Karini D’Avila	1.76	18	80-59-86
Cameroon	Marie-Françoise Omengue	1.80	21	
Canada	Joly-Ann Laporte	1.78	16	81-58-87
Chile	Catalina Chadwick	1.75	14	84-63-90
China	Xu Naiqing	1.78	18	78-61-86
China	Zhao Wanqiu	1.77	18	78-61-86
Chinese Taipei	Angela Chen	1.77	20	
Czech Republic	Eva Klimkova	1.78	16	80-59-89
Denmark	Filippa Rye Rønhof	1.77	15	79-55-88
Estonia	Herke Karin Room	1.81	15	85-64-90
France	Estelle Chen	1.77	15	79-58-87
Georgia	Anastasia Igonina	1.79	14	83-60-90
Germany	Gina Bilinski	1.80	16	
Great Britain	May Constance Bell	1.75	17	79-60-84
Haiti	Cassandra Chery	1.77	18	79-60-84
Hungary	Dalma Baczay	1.77	14	80-60-89
Iceland	Heba Thorhildur Stefansdóttir	1.74	14	81-62-91
Israel	Kristina Agapova	1.79	21	85-60-90
Italy	Ilenia Biato	1.81	15	
Luxembourg	Clara Biagi	1.73	19	
Mexico	Marilyn Trewartha	1.76	18	88-62-92
Moldova	Bianca Iofciu	1.76	15	
Montenegro	Kristina Stevovic	1.79	14	81-59-86
Morocco	Nouhaïla Ameur	1.74	15	
Netherlands	Jaimie de Jong	1.79	16	83-65-88
New Zealand	Eden Bristowe	1.75	15	81-63-89
Nigeria	Nneoma Edith Anosike	1.75	18	
Norway	Sunniva Halkjelsvik	1.79	16	77-63-86
Peru	Marylin Saldaña	1.78	14	
Poland	Iga Estkowska	1.78	17	81-60-90
Portugal	Ana Baptista	1.77	17	80-62-90
Puerto Rico	Karina Ramírez	1.74	14	
Reunion	Raïssa Cadarsi	1.77	17	
Romania	Patricia Paty	1.80	14	
Russia	Anita Zaporotskova	1.78	15	78-58-85
Serbia	Sandra Balaban	1.78	14	82-61-88
Slovakia	Barbora Kolarikova	1.77	14	80-61-88
South Africa	Bianca Rentzke	1.77	17	82-60-88
Spain	Noelia Castro Otero	1.75	16	
Sweden	Trixi Johnsson	1.75	16	80-61-86
Switzerland	Audrey Bousquet	1.80	17	86-63-89
Thailand	Narawadee Ruangpeng	1.75	19	
Ukraine	Lyubov Hryniv	1.77	16	83-60-88
United Arab Emirates	Isabella Haycock	1.77	18	
United States	Kaylin Rogers	1.79	18	81-59-88
United States	Lauren Taylor	1.78	19	81-61-86
Uruguay	Emiliana Mendez	1.78	19	
Venezuela	Vanessa Carolina Pinto	1.75	18	
