= Trinidad de la Noi =

Chilean model

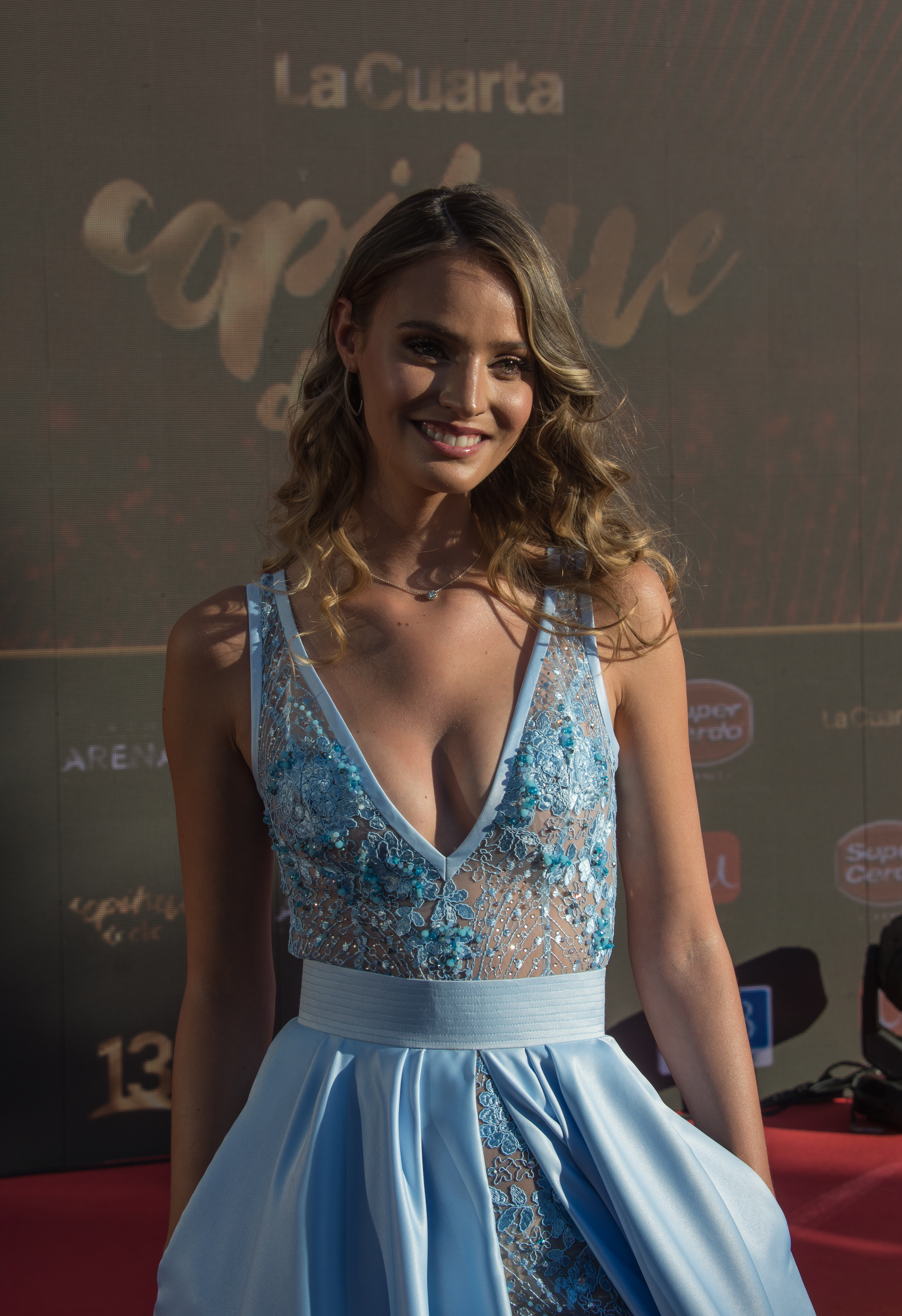
- De la Noi in 2018
- Born: Trinidad De la Noi Gutierrez; April 24, 1998 (age 28); Santiago, Chile
- Occupation: Model
- Years active: 2012–present
- Modeling information
- Height: 5 ft 10 in (1.78 m)
- Hair color: Light brown
- Eye color: Green

Trinidad de la Noi Gutierrez (born April 24, 1998) is a Chilean model, TV Host, actress and winner of the contest Elite Model Chile 2012. She represented Chile at Elite Model Look International 2012 contest, where she finished 1st Runner-Up.

== Life ==
Trinidad de la Noi was born April 24, 1998, in Santiago, Chile, to Alberto de la Noi and Carmen Gutierrez. She has a twin brother named Lucas.

At twelve years old, Trinidad was discovered by a modeling agent of Felipe Ramirez when she was in a mall. As she was very young, she was signed by the agency Elite Model but had to wait until the age of fourteen to start her modeling career .

== Elite Model Look Chile ==
In August 2012, she won the Elite agency contest to find the best model in Chile, and that same year participated in the World Elite contest that was held in Shanghai, China, and was 1st runner-up. She is the third Chilean to achieve the title of first runner-up.

She was signed for several campaigns for major sports firms including Adidas and the magazine Women's Health. While still a teenager and still studying, De la Noi travelled to Europe during her school vacations to work, at fifteen she did her first show at the Milan Fashion Week, where she paraded for signature Dolce & Gabbana, and her first international campaign, to the prestigious La Perla. De la Noi has modeled for the following international companies: Tommy Hilfiger, Armani, Vogue Italia, La Perla, Dolce & Gabbana, Revlon, Bobbi Brown. She has also made appearances in the cover of International magazines like Women's health, Elle, Cosmopolitan and Harpers Bazar.

== Filmograph ==
Year	Title	Role	Notes
2014	Maldito amor	María Elena	Lead role

== Personal life ==
She married Cristóbal González in 2021 but separated in 2024.

She married Olympic beach volleyball player Esteban Grimalt in 2026.
