= Tristan Tymen =

French model

- Modeling information
- Height: 192 cm (6 ft 4 in)
- Hair color: Brown
- Eye color: Green
- Agencies: Elite Look Management (2015-2018)

Tristan Tymen is a French model from Lyon and the winner of the 2015 Elite Model Look competition. He was the first French model to win the men's competition. Tymen then signed a three-year contract with Elite Model Management.
