= Action Jackson (2014 film) =

2014 Indian film by Prabhu Deva

- Theatrical release poster
- Directed by: Prabhu Deva
- Written by: Prabhu Deva
- Screenplay by: A. C. Mugil; Shiraz Ahmed
- Story by: A. C. Mugil
- Produced by: Gordhan P. Tanwani; Sunil Lulla
- Starring: Ajay Devgn; Yami Gautam; Sonakshi Sinha; Kunaal Roy Kapur; Manasvi Mamgai; Anandaraj
- Cinematography: Vijay Kumar Arora
- Edited by: Bunty Nagi
- Music by: Songs: Himesh Reshammiya; Score: Sandeep Chowta
- Production company: Baba Films
- Distributed by: Eros International
- Release date: 5 December 2014
- Running time: 144 minutes
- Country: India
- Language: Hindi
- Budget: ₹93 crore
- Box office: ₹88.87 crore

Action Jackson is a 2014 Indian Hindi-language action comedy film directed by Prabhu Deva and produced by Gordhan P. Tanwani and Sunil Lulla. The name of the film is borrowed from the 1988 American film. It stars Ajay Devgn in a dual role, alongside Yami Gautam, Sonakshi Sinha, Manasvi Mamgai, Kunaal Roy Kapur and Anandaraj.

Action Jackson was released on 5 December 2014 to negative reviews from critics and bombed at the box office.

== Plot ==
In Mumbai, Vishi, a small-time crook who would do anything for money, falls in love with Khushi, a simple HR executive. Vishi, who frequently gets involved in fights, publicly beats up a street gangster. The gangster later brutally beats up Vishi and easily escapes. It is then revealed that the person they had beaten is Jai, Vishi's lookalike, leading them to be badly battered. ACP Shirke chases Vishi, who escapes. However, Shirke then arrests Jai and hands him over to a group of gangsters led by Pedro, but Jai single-handedly kills them all. It is revealed that Jai is AJ, a professional assassin.

Past: AJ works as a right-hand man for Xavier Fonseca, a crime boss in Bangkok centrally operating in New Delhi and Mumbai. He single-handedly rescues Xavier's sister Marina from a bunch of kidnappers. Marina soon falls for Jai, but he rejects her as he is married to Anusha. An enraged Xavier tries to kill Anusha to get AJ married to Marina, which leaves her brutally injured. Jai escapes to India, and he is in the process of getting her treated.

Present: Vishi spots Jai and soon learns about his past. Jai asks Vishi to go to Bangkok disguised as AJ in order to fool Xavier and Marina, while he makes time to get Anusha operated on as she is expecting a baby. Vishi agrees to help and goes to Bangkok with his friend Musa. Shirke finds AJ's lookalike and tries to inform Xavier, but he is murdered in a style that triggers suspicion in Xavier's mind. Upon realizing the situation, Marina tortures Musa to find out the truth, and Musa reveals that Vishi is the one who masqueraded as AJ. Xavier hatches a plan to bring AJ to Bangkok by kidnapping Anusha and her child.

However, it is revealed that Vishi is actually in Mumbai as he and AJ switched their places in the airport at a time after the job was done. AJ reaches the spot and kills all of Xavier's henchmen. In a fight with Marina, AJ smashes her against the furnace, and Marina is burned alive. After killing Xavier, AJ runs away with Anusha. Later, the child is revealed to be safe, rescued by one of Xavier's henchmen, Robert. AJ and Vishi meet at the airport, and Anusha requests that Vishi marry Khushi soon.

== Cast ==
- Ajay Devgn in a dual role as
  - Jai alias AJ
  - Vishi
- Sonakshi Sinha as Khushi, Vishi's love interest
- Yami Gautam as Anusha, Jai's wife
- Kunaal Roy Kapur as Moosa
- Manasvi Mamgai as Marina Fonseca, Xavier's sister
- Anandaraj as Xavier Fonseca, AJ's boss and Marina's brother
- Jeetu Verma as Chotu
- Razak Khan as Lala Godbole, Xavier's henchman
- Arti Puri as Khushi's friend
- Ankita Bhargava as Khushi's friend
- Vinita Menon as Khushi's friend
- Myra Joshi as Khushi's friend
- Nataša Stanković as Natasha, Anusha's friend
- Puru Raaj Kumar as Inspector Shirke
- Ganesh Yadav as Inspector Mayekar
- Ketan Karande as Pedro
- Shaji Choudhary as Mumbai gang goon
- Rocky Verma as Xavier's henchmen in New Zealand
- Sulabha Arya as Vishi's neighbour
- Mahesh Rale as Police Commissioner
- Nalneesh Neel as Paanwala
- Poorva Parag as Khushi's mother

=== Cameo appearances ===
- Shawar Ali as Nawab, Xavier's rival
- Rajesh Khattar as an arms dealer
- Prabhas (in the song "Punjabi Mast")
- Shahid Kapoor (in the song "Punjabi Mast")
- Prabhu Deva (in the song "AJ Theme")

== Soundtrack ==
Action Jackson

Soundtrack album by Himesh Reshammiya
- Released: 11 June 2014
- Recorded: 2014
- Venue: Mumbai
- Genre: Feature Film Soundtrack
- Label: Eros Music
- Producer: Himesh Reshammiya

Himesh Reshammiya chronology
Kick (2014)	Action Jackson (2014)	Prem Ratan Dhan Payo (2015)

The soundtrack was composed by Himesh Reshammiya, while the lyrics were written by Shabbir Ahmed and Sameer. The introduction of "Gangster Baby" is from "Adiyae Kolluthe" from Vaaranam Aayiram, which itself is based on AC/DC's "Love Bomb".

=== Track listing ===
No.	Title	Lyrics	Music	Singer(s)	Length
1.	"Dhoom Dhaam"	Sameer	Himesh Reshammiya	Ankit Tiwari, Palak Muchhal	4:38
2.	"Punjabi Mast"	Sameer	Himesh Reshammiya	Ankit Tiwari, Neeti Mohan, Arya Acharya, Alamgir Khan, Vineet Singh	4:14
3.	"Gangster Baby"	Shabbir Ahmed	Himesh Reshammiya	Neeraj Shridhar, Neeti Mohan	4:40
4.	"Chichora Piya"	Sameer	Himesh Reshammiya	Shalmali Kholgade, Himesh Reshammiya	4:27
5.	"Keeda"	Shabbir Ahmed	Himesh Reshammiya	Himesh Reshammiya, Neeti Mohan	3:06
6.	"Keeda" (remix)	Shabbir Ahmed	Himesh Reshammiya	Himesh Reshammiya, Neeti Mohan	3:00
7.	"Punjabi Mast" (remix)	Shabbir Ahmed	Himesh Reshammiya	Himesh Reshammiya, Ankit Tiwari, Neeti Mohan, Arya Acharya, Alamgir Khan, Vineet Singh	3:53
8.	"Chichora Piya" (remix)	Sameer	Himesh Reshammiya	Himesh Reshammiya, Shalmali Kholgade	4:08
9.	"Keeda" (reprise)	Shabbir Ahmed	Himesh Reshammiya	Himesh Reshammiya, Neeti Mohan	3:06
Total length:					35:12

== Reception ==
Action Jackson received mixed to negative reviews from critics who praised Devgn's performances, cinematography, music and action sequences, but criticised its humor and script.

Gayatri Sarkar from Zee News gave 1/5 stars and wrote that the film failed to entertain the audience. Rajeev Masand rated the film 3/5 stars, feeling that the film has excessive action. Under a headline calling the film a feminist milestone, Raja Sen for Rediff rated it 3/5 stars, saying that while the film is filled with "relentless absurdity", the women propel the narrative in a refreshing way. Rachit Gupta of Filmfare gave a similar rating of 3/5 stars stating that the genre mixing of unscripted comedy and stylized action is "too inconsistent to garner any appreciation". Mumbai Mirror similarly gave 3/5 stars and responded positively.
