= Dipti Sharma =

Indian model

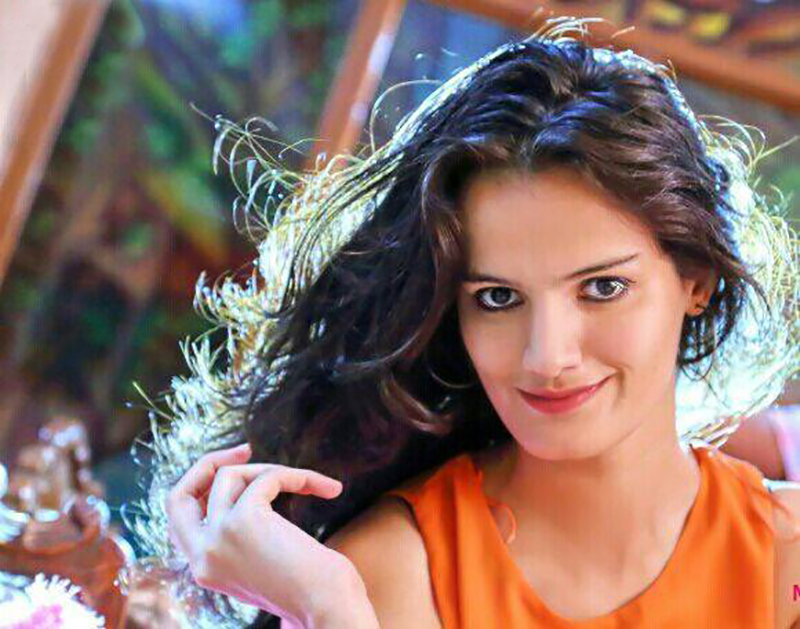
- Born: 23 October 1994 (age 31); Rudrapur, Uttarakhand, India
- Occupation: Model
- Years active: 2014–present
- Modeling information
- Hair color: Black
- Eye color: Brown
- Agency: Elite Model Management (New York, Los Angeles); New Madison (Paris); Women Management (Milan); Premier Model Management (London)

Dipti Sharma is an Indian fashion model and beauty pageant finalist. Sharma debuted as an exclusive for Balenciaga's S/S 2018 show, which she closed, and is the first Indian model to appear in their campaign.

== Early life ==
Sharma was born in Rudrapur, in the Indian state of Uttarakhand.

== Career ==
She was studying English at Panjab University when she entered the Campus Princess 2015 beauty pageant. Although she did not win Campus Princess she was a finalist and won the title of 'Miss Rampwalk'. Sharma then entered the Elite Model Look India contest in 2015, which she won. Sharma then went on to compete in Milan for the international Elite Model Look title. She was unplaced in the international contest which was won by Anouk Thijssen.

Sharma's hair was cut into her signature bowl cut by hairstylist Holli Smith for the Balenciaga S/S 2018 show.

Sharma has been featured in magazines such as Crash, Vogue India and Harper's Bazaar Russia.
