= Renata Ruiz =

Chilean model (born 1984)

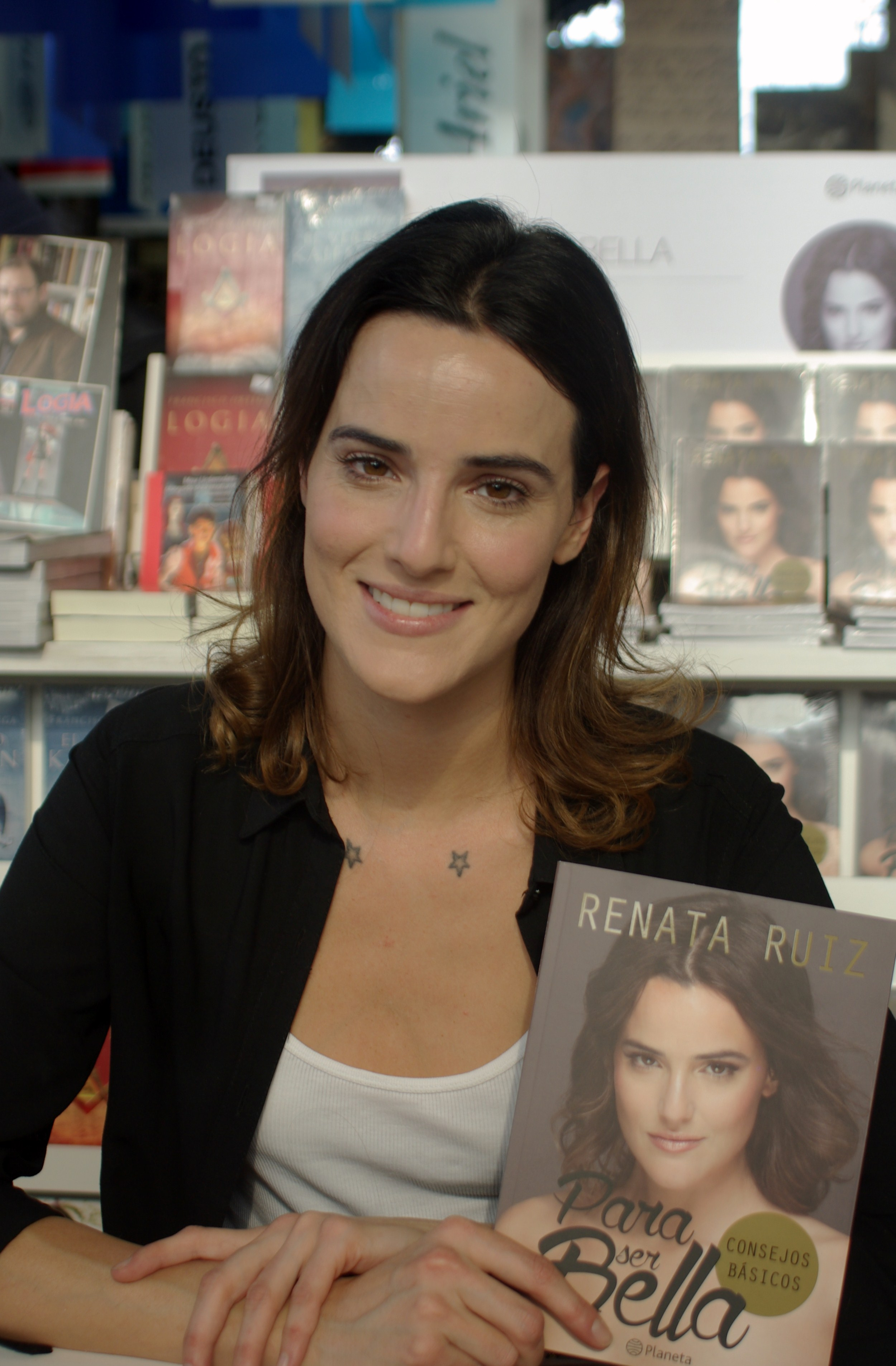
- Renata Ruiz in 2015.
- Born: Renata Ruiz Pérez; 9 May 1984 (age 42); Santiago, Chile
- Education: Pontifical Catholic University of Chile
- Height: 5 ft 10 in (1.78 m)
- Beauty pageant titleholder
- Title: Elite Model Look Chile 2001; Miss Universo Chile 2005
- Hair color: Brown
- Eye color: Brown
- Major competitions: Elite Model Look Chile 2001 (winner); Elite Model Look Int'l 2001 (1st runner-up); Miss Universo Chile 2005 (winner); Miss Universe 2005 (unplaced)

Renata Ruiz Pérez (born 9 May 1984) is a Chilean model, sociologist and beauty pageant titleholder.

== Career ==
She was the winner of the contest Elite Model Look Chile 2001. In September of the same year she took part in the international final of that contest (Nice, France) with more than 60 delegates from 40 countries. Ruiz was the 1st runner-up, behind Rianne Ten Haken from the Netherlands. Another Dutch woman, Femke Lakenman, was the 2nd runner-up.

Ruiz represented Chile at the Miss Universe 2005 in Thailand. She was elected under the organization of Ana Maria Cummins and Francisco Zegers. She did not place in the pageant, which was won by the Canadian Natalie Glebova.

== Filmography ==
=== Radio ===
- Canciones Play (Play FM)
- Mapa Play (Play FM)
- Ciudad Rock & Pop (Rock & Pop) (2013–present)
- La Picá de Uno (Radio Uno) (2014) (guest)

=== Televisión ===
- Algo esta pasando (Chilevisión) (2014)

Awards and achievements
Preceded by Gabriela Barros	Miss Universo Chile; 2005	Succeeded by Belén Montilla
Preceded by Eva Siebert	Elite Model Look Chile; 2001	Succeeded by Ximena Huilipán
