= Miss Universo Chile 2005 =

- Date: May 9, 2005
- Presenters: Gabriela Barros; Cristián Gordon
- Venue: Hacienda Santa Martina, Santiago de Chile
- Broadcaster: TVO
- Entrants: 14
- Winner: Renata Ruiz; Región Metropolitana

Miss Universo Chile 2005, the 46th Miss Chile pageant, was held in Santiago de Chile on May 9, 2005. The pageant was broadcast live on TVO from Hacienda Santa Martina. At the conclusion of the night, outgoing titleholder Gabriela Barros crowned Renata Ruiz as the new Miss Chile.

== Final results ==
Final results	Contestant
Miss Universo Chile 2005	Región Metropolitana - Renata Ruiz
1st Runner-Up	Magallanes y Antártica Chilena - Adriana Aguayo
2nd Runner-Up	O'Higgins - Sycille Jeria
Top 8	Ciudad Capital - Claudia Fahrenkrog; Valparaíso - Francisca Ayala; Los Lagos - Macarena Villegas; Bío Bío - María Espinoza; Atacama - Paulina Gaete

== Delegates ==
14 delegates were selected this year.

Represents	Name	Age	Height	Hometown
Viña del mar	Francisca Metzler Fiori	19	1.77 m (5 ft 9 1/2 in)	Viña del mar
Araucanía	Claudia Barriga	24	1.70 m (5 ft 7 in)	Temuco
Atacama	Paulina Gaete	24	1.77 m (5 ft 9 1/2 in)	Copiapó
Aysén	Camila Cercós	19	1.71 m (5 ft 7 1/2 in)	Coihaique
Bío Bío	María José Espinoza	21	1.82 m (5 ft 11 1/2 in)	Concepción
Ciudad Capital	Claudia Fahrenkrog	22	1.78 m (5 ft 10 in)	Santiago de Chile
Coquimbo	María Elena Araya	24	1.83 m (6 ft 0 in)	Ovalle
Los Lagos	Macarena Villegas	23	1.79 m (5 ft 10 1/2 in)	Osorno
Magallanes y Antártica Chilena	Adriana Aguayo	24	1.75 m (5 ft 9 in)	Punta Arenas
Maule	Bárbara Alvarado	17	1.74 m (5 ft 8 1/2 in)	Talca
O'Higgins	Sicylle Jeria	24	1.79 m (5 ft 10 1/2 in)	Rengo
Región Metropolitana	Renata Ruiz	21	1.78 m (5 ft 10 in)	Santiago de Chile
Tarapacá	Macarena Sepúlveda	21	1.77 m (5 ft 9 1/2 in)	Iquique
Valparaíso	Francisca Ayala	25	1.81 m (5 ft 11 1/2 in)	Hanga Roa

== Notes ==
- Hil Hernández, Miss Earth 2006 was selected as a delegate this year but finally she withdrew of the pageant.
- Renata Ruiz placed first runner-up in Elite Model Look International 2001. Former Miss Universe Dayana Mendoza, also participated in this competition.
