= Nyasha Matonhodze =

British fashion model

- Born: Zimbabwe
- Occupation: Fashion model
- Modelling information
- Height: 1.80 m (5 ft 11 in)
- Hair colour: Brown
- Eye colour: Brown
- Agency: Women Management (New York); Elite Model Management (worldwide); Model Management (Hamburg); Munich Models (Munich); Models1 (London) (mother agency)

Nyasha Matonhodze is a Zimbabwean-British fashion model.

== Career ==
Matonhodze won the Elite Model Look UK contest in 2009. She signed with Elite Model Management, and walked for brands including Louis Vuitton, LOEWE, and Emmanuel Ungaro in her debut season. She also walked for Marc Jacobs, Dior, and Michael Kors. She closed Balenciaga.

At age 16, she appeared in a Louis Vuitton campaign, photographed by Steven Meisel. The ensemble campaign also starred Daphne Groeneveld, Anais Pouliot, Fei Fei Sun, Zuzanna Bijoch, and Gertrud Hegelund.

Matonhodze has been on the cover of Love magazine. She has also appeared in Harper's Bazaar, Teen Vogue, and V.

She was ranked on models.com's "Top 50 Models" list in 2011.
