= Charlotte Di Calypso =

French fashion model

Charlotte di Calypso
- Born: Charlotte Belliard; 17 April 1990 (age 34); La Baule, France
- Other names: Charlotte Taillard
- Modeling information
- Height: 5 ft 10 in (1.78 m)
- Hair color: Blonde
- Eye color: Blue
- Agency: Elite Model Management (Paris, Milan, Amsterdam, Spain, Copenhagen, Toronto); Modellink (Gothenburg); Model Management (Hamburg); Munich Models (Munich); MP Stockholm (Stockholm)

Charlotte di Calypso (born Charlotte Belliard, 17 April 1990) is a French fashion model best known for winning the Elite Model Look in 2005 and being the face of the Chanel Chance perfume.

== Early life ==
Charlotte di Calypso was born Charlotte Belliard in La Baule, France. In 2005, at age fifteen, she entered the French Elite Model Look and was chosen to move on to the international final in Shanghai. She won the competition, earning herself a contract with the prestigious Elite Model Management in Paris.

== Career ==
After her win, Di Calypso debuted in fashion in September 2005, modeling for the Prada Spring 2006 collection. She then booked her first campaign, with Topshop. Her runway work forged her career, walking for top designers and fashion houses, like Chanel, Valentino, Yohji Yamamoto, Dolce & Gabbana, Jil Sander, Diane von Furstenberg, and Emanuel Ungaro. For the Spring 2009 haute couture season, she opened for Christian Dior and walked for Christian Lacroix, Chanel, Valentino, and Giorgio Armani. Di Calypso recently became Ralph Lauren's new face, replacing longtime face Valentina Zelyaeva alongside Japanese model Tao Okamoto. She has appeared in Gucci, Pucci, Ralph Lauren, Lacoste, Chanel, and Façonnable advertisements. She was also featured in a spread of Vogue Paris, alongside other French models Sigrid Agren, Jennifer Messelier, Mélodie Dagault, Constance Jablonski, and Mathilde Julia Frachon, declaring France as the country to produce the next wave of supermodels, as other countries like Russia and Brazil had done before. She has appeared in French, Italian, Portuguese, and Japanese Vogue, Harpers Bazaar, Allure, and Dazed & Confused editorials.
