= Heidi Albertsen =

Danish international model

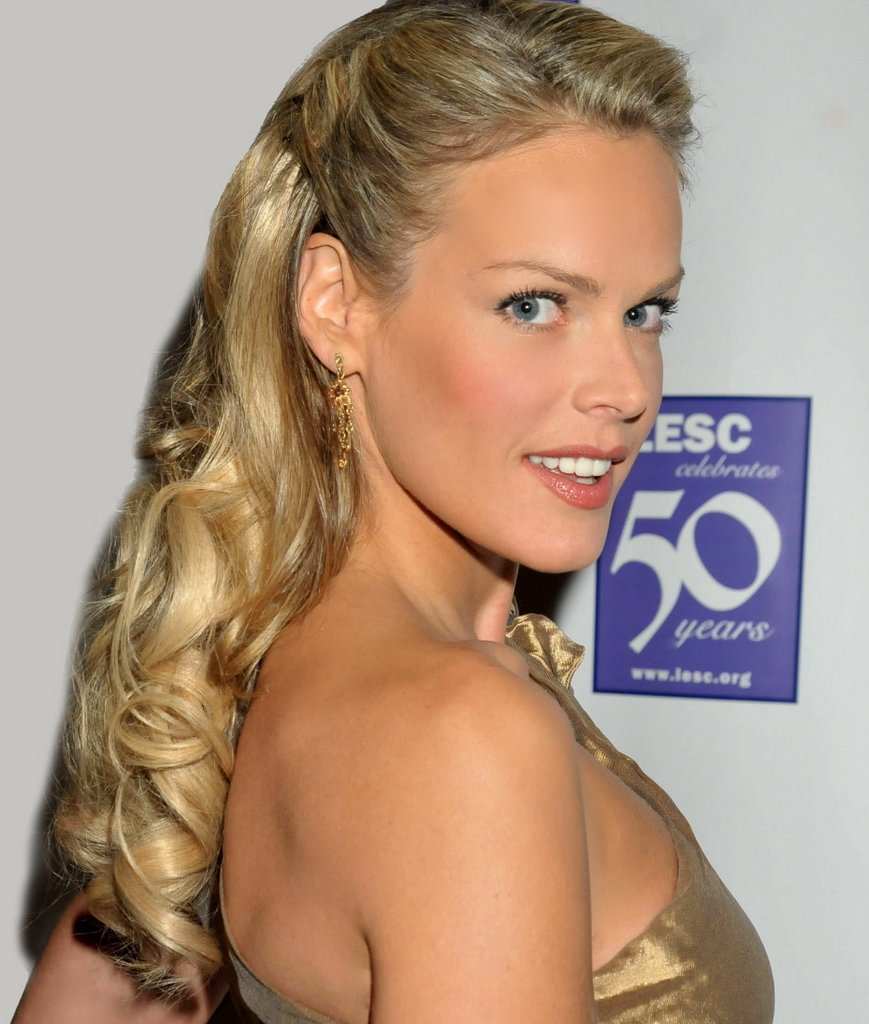
- Born: Heidi Albertsen; September 1, 1976 (age 49); Copenhagen, Denmark
- Occupation: Model
- Years active: 1993–present
- Modeling information
- Height: 1.78 m (5 ft 10 in)
- Hair color: Blonde
- Eye color: Blue
- Website: http://www.heidialbertsen.com/

Heidi Albertsen (born September 1, 1976) is a Danish international model. She is a goodwill ambassador for Life Project for Africa, the Lower Eastside Service Center and Riverkeeper, on which she serves as a member of the organization's Leadership Council.

== Early life ==
Albertsen was born in Copenhagen, Denmark. Her first job, at the age of 10, was delivering newspapers in her hometown of Copenhagen. She later worked as a dishwasher at a restaurant and butcher shop, and she sold chocolate at a candy store. As a young girl, Albertsen struggled with obesity and eczema, which resulted in bullying from her school peers, but eventually she managed to lose the weight and curb the eczema, after which time she says she was "strongly encouraged to enter the modeling world."

At the age of 17, Albertsen was the winner of the 1993 Elite Model Look World Final, the annual fashion modeling contest held by Elite Model Management that attracts more than 350,000 participants every year from 800 cities in 70 countries across 5 continents. Within weeks, she moved to Manhattan to embark upon her newly catapulted supermodel career.

== Career ==
Albertsen has appeared in print and television advertisements throughout her career. Since the mid-1990s, she has had a presence in runway shows, magazines, films, and commercials around the world. She has been seen in and on the cover of Vogue, Harper's Bazaar, Elle, Sports Illustrated, Cosmopolitan, Vanity Fair, Shape, Woman, M!, and several fitness magazines. She has been the featured model in numerous campaigns by La Perla, L'Oréal, Guess, Nicole Miller, Roberto Cavalli and Victoria's Secret. She has appeared on Fox News, MTV, E-Channel, Oxygen, Good Morning America and other shows. Albertsen has also worked for American Express, Armani, Comme des Garçons, Clairol, Dove, Fruit of the Loom, Neutrogena, and Vera Wang, among others.

Fitness magazine featured her as Body of the Year for 2000.

Albertsen has stated that some of her favorite shoots include those with her friend and designer, Nicole Miller; photographer Albert Watson in Nice, France and photographer Fabrizio Ferri in Milan, Italy, both for Escada; and with photographer Antoine Verglas for a Max magazine cover and calendar.

In addition to her print and commercial credits, she counts among film credits working with Nicolas Cage in National Treasure, Ben Stiller in Zoolander, Woody Allen directing Celebrity, and a David Breashears' IMAX film Kilimanjaro: To the Roof of Africa for the National Geographic Society.

Albertsen was chosen by Breashears in 2000 to be part of the team to climb Kilimanjaro, the world's largest freestanding mountain in Tanzania, Africa. The expedition had seven climbers, including Albertsen. She completed the climb twice, the first time in June 2000 and the second in November 2000. Albertsen described the quests of climbing to the top of the 19,341 feet (5,895 m) peak as experiences that challenged her "physically, emotionally and intellectually." She documented the climb through sketches, painting, photography, and by filming her own documentary.

Albertsen has had noteworthy appearances in judging modeling and beauty competitions. In 2005, Albertsen was a celebrity judge in the Miss Universe Pageant, which was held in Thailand. In 1994, Albertsen was a celebrity judge in the 1994 Elite Model Look World Final in Ibiza, Spain. Between 1995 and 1999, she judged the Elite Model Look national competitions of Denmark, Indonesia, and Thailand.

In 2011, Albertsen was a contestant on the Danish franchise of the television show MasterChef, which achieved the highest ratings among all MasterChef national franchises throughout Europe. In 2013, she reunited with the production and joined the television series as a contestant on MasterChef Denmark All-Stars.

In November 2013, Albertsen appeared on Fox News and discussed with Carol Alt her lifelong battle with eczema and her childhood obesity. She wrote in detail about her regimen for curbing her eczema episodes.

She has contributed to a host of projects, books, and publications that center on health, fitness, diet, and nutrition. In 2018, she was a featured contributor to a nutrition book published by Penguin Random House and Hatherleigh Press. She wrote that as a teenager, she modified her diet to increase her consumption of plant-based foods, and she credits this strategy for boosting her energy and helping her overcome food sensitivities.

== Charity work ==
Albertsen has served as a spokesperson for multiple charities that benefit abandoned children, children with HIV and AIDS, and the homeless. She continues to serve as a goodwill ambassador for multiple charities. She is the chief ambassador and spokesperson for the Life Project for Africa, a non-profit organization that aims to save lives and benefit the impoverished in Africa through services that promote health, provide education, address poverty, and provide shelter to the homeless. She is ambassador and spokesperson for the Lower Eastside Service Center (LESC), a non-profit organization that aims to provide a full continuum of treatment and care for New Yorkers living with chemical dependency and mental health issues. She advocates for the Pregnant Women and Infants Program, a program of the LESC created to meet the unmet needs of pregnant women with opiate addiction. She also advocates for Bridge2Life, an auxiliary of the LESC that aims to benefit inner-city children of families who are in recovery.

Since 2013, she has volunteered as a goodwill ambassador for Riverkeeper, a non-profit environmental organization championed for decades by Robert F. Kennedy, Jr. and dedicated to the protection of the Hudson River and its tributaries, as well as the watersheds that provide New York City with its drinking water. As of 2015 she has served and continues to serve as a member of the organization's Leadership Council.

== Education ==
Between 2006 and 2010, while continuing to model, Albertsen pursued part-time studies in New York City at the National Academy School of Fine Arts, Hunter College, and the City University of New York. In addition, she attended Parsons The New School for Design and the Art Students League of New York.

== Personal life ==
Albertsen self-identifies as a Christian in the Protestant tradition and professes a respect for all religions. She advocates a healthy, well-balanced lifestyle, one that combines fitness, beauty, strength and style. She is an active sportswoman. Among other things, she cooks, paints, rock climbs, water skis, runs marathons, plays tennis and golf, and does yoga. She resides in the Manhattan borough of New York City.

On July 15, 2016, Albertsen announced via social media that she became a citizen of the United States of America, while retaining dual citizenship with her native Denmark.

On October 3, 2016, Albertsen announced on social media that she and entrepreneur Darren Mercer had welcomed a son named Charles Christian Albertsen Mercer. On December 20, 2022, the couple shared the news of expecting another child. More than six years after the birth of their son in 2016, the couple, on March 20, 2023, welcomed twin girls, as confirmed by Danish media.
