= Nieves Álvarez =

Spanish model and television presenter (born 1974)

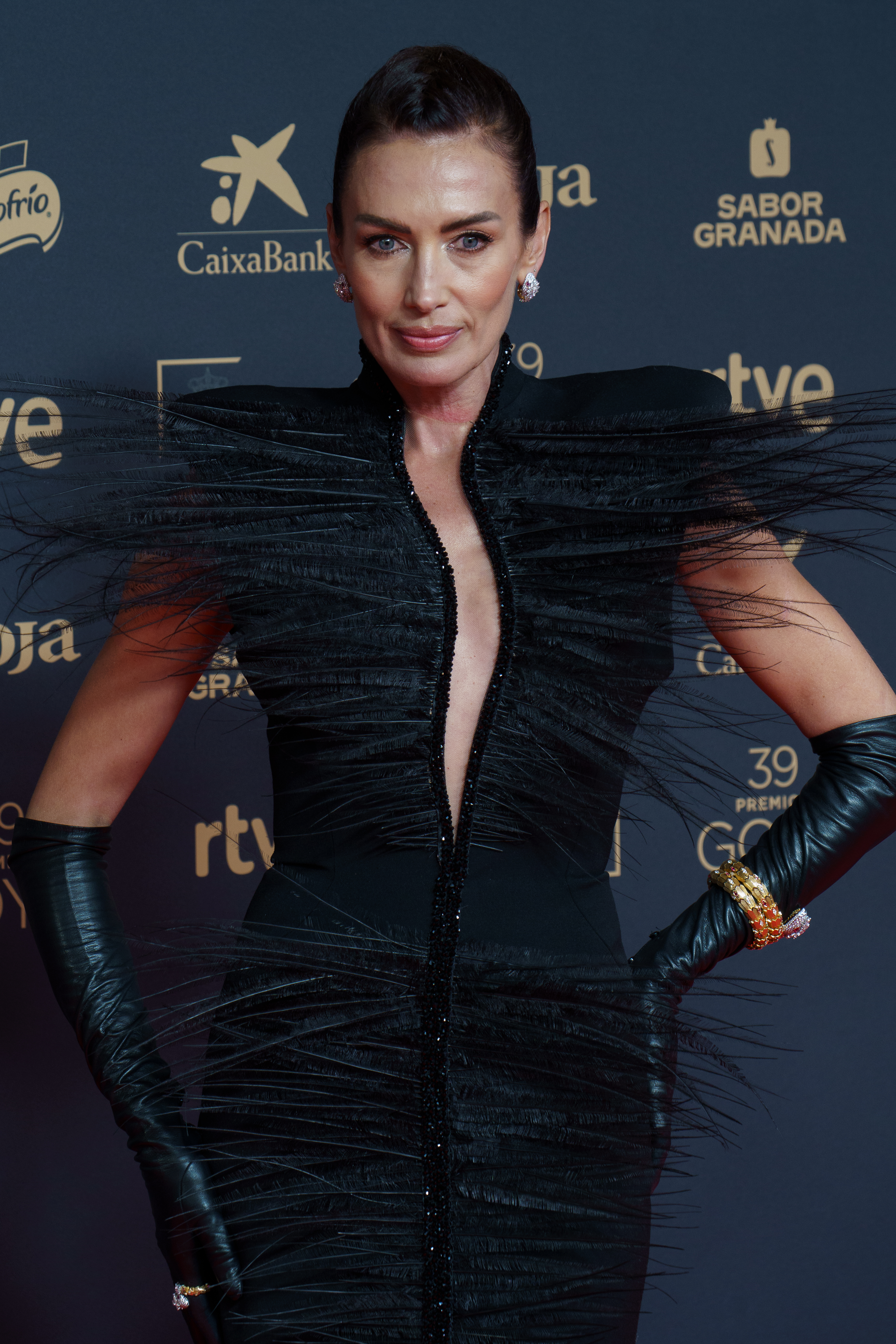
- Álvarez in 2025
- Born: 30 March 1974 (age 52); Madrid, Spain
- Occupations: Model; television presenter
- Spouse: Marco Severini (m. 2002; div. 2015)
- Children: 3

Nieves Álvarez (born 30 March 1974) is a Spanish model and television presenter.

== Career ==
In 1992, Álvarez was a finalist at the Elite Look of the Year model search competition held by Elite Model Management. She subsequently worked for Yves Saint Laurent, Christian Lacroix, Emanuel Ungaro, Vivienne Westwood, Jean-Paul Gaultier and Prada, among others.

In 2001, Álvarez related her personal experience with anorexia in the book Yo vencí la anorexia, which she wrote alongside Lola Cintado Tejada.

Since 2012, Álvarez has presented the television show Solo moda (retitled as Flash moda in 2014) for TVE, which focuses on the fashion industry.

Álvarez was the Spanish spokesperson for the jury vote at the Eurovision Song Contest 2017, and was likewise the Spanish spokesperson for the 2018 contest, 2019 contest, 2021 contest and 2022 contest.
