= Juliana Martins (model) =

Brazilian model (born 1984)

- Born: 3 October 1984 (age 41); José Bonifácio, São Paulo state

Juliana Martins (born 3 October 1984 in José Bonifácio, São Paulo state) is a Brazilian model. She worked for Sports Illustrated, and contested in the 1997 Elite Model Look. Juliana Martins was labeled the "Brazilian Cindy Crawford" by John Casablancas when she was thirteen years old.

== Print ==
- Marie Claire
- Sports Illustrated
