= Elite Model Look International 2016 =

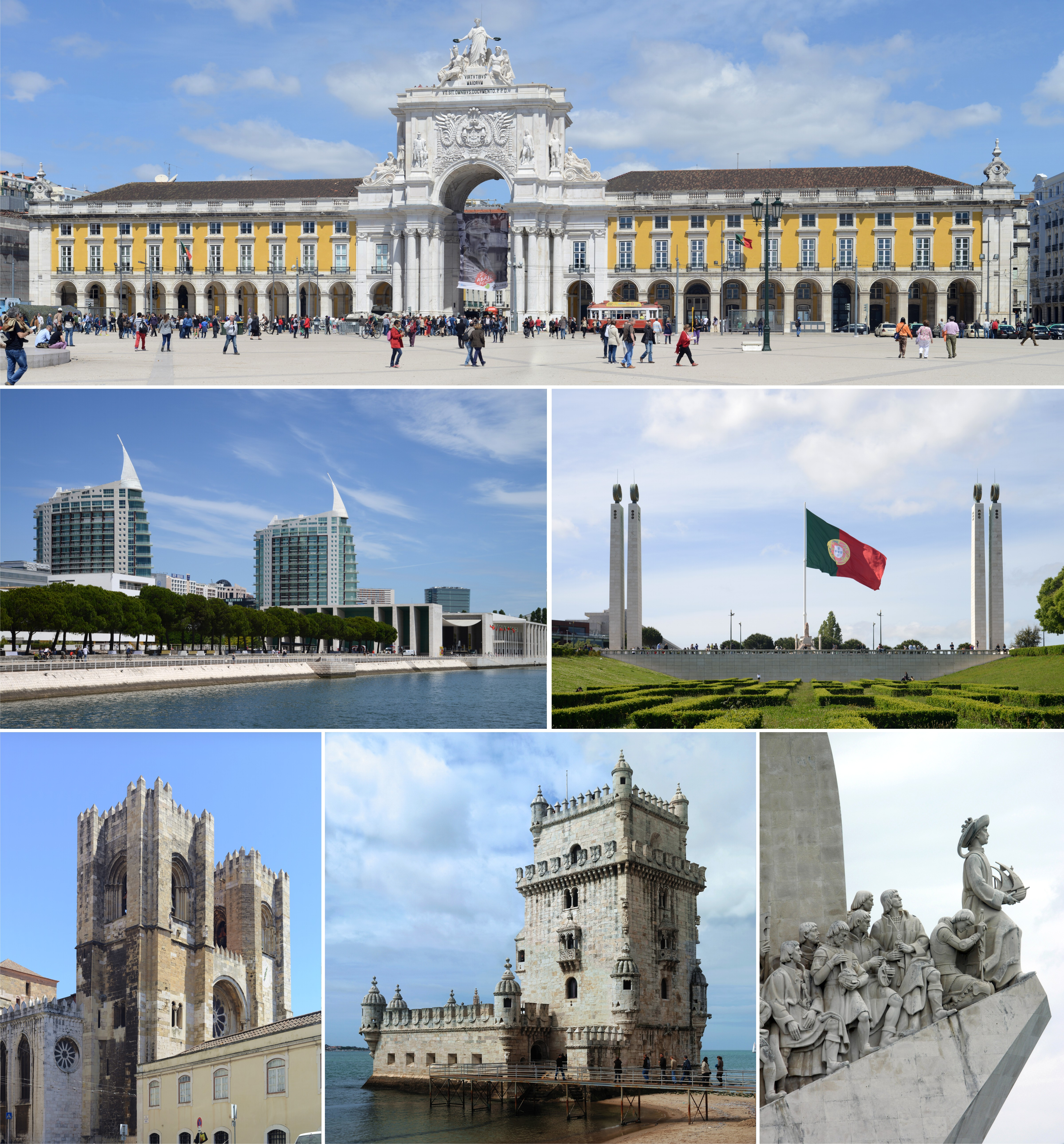
- Date: November 23, 2016
- Venue: Lisbon, Portugal
- Entrants: 62
- Withdrawals: Uruguay, Hungary
- Returns: Croatia, Brazil, Ukraine, Tunisia, Thailand, Belgium
- Winner: Jana Tvrdiková from Czech Republic; Davidson Obennebo from Nigeria

Elite Model Look International 2016 was held on November 23, 2016, in Lisbon, Portugal. The winners of the title was Jana Tvrdiková from Czech Republic and Davidson Obennebo from Nigeria.

== Placements ==
Posiciones	Modelo
Elite Model Look International 2016	Czech Republic - Jana Tvrdinová; Nigeria - Davidson Obennebo
Top 10 (Girls)	Belgium - Cosima Lagae; Denmark - Lucca Kjaergaard; United States - Lizzie Swanson; France - Marie Konc; Netherlands - Joyce Bergevoet; Portugal - Zara Bicha; Russia - Katya Bybina; Sweden - Freja Nygren; Ukraine - Alina Dementieva
Top 5 (Boys)	Belgium - Julien Breuskin; Denmark - Anders Baerentzen; France - Etienne Robert; Sweden - Jesper Wedberg
