= Mara Darmousli =

Greek model

- Born: 15 August 1981 (age 44); Ptolemaida, Greece
- Spouse(s): Pavlos Kaponis (m. 2005–2008) Vasilis Tsatsakis (2020-present)
- Children: Angelos Kaponis; Michalis Tsatsakis
- Modeling information
- Height: 1.74 m (5 ft 9 in)
- Hair color: Light brown
- Eye color: Brown

Mara Darmousli, in Greek: Μάρα Δαρμουσλή, (born 15 August, in Ptolemaida, Greece) is a Greek former fashion model and current actress.

She has appeared in many international fashion events and magazines, with her face appearing on the covers of such magazines as Vogue, Marie Claire and Bazaar. Her international advertisements include Pantene, Parah, Nivea, Simone Perele, Triumph, Clairol, Garnier and Carita.

In 1998 she was discovered by model agent and producer of the Greek Elite Model Look contest Nikos Voglis. She entered the contest and won first place in the Greek Elite Model Look final. She then advanced to the Nice International final, held in September in the French Riviera, where she came in third overall in the Pantene contest. Voglis as the owner of Prestige agency in Athens, managed the first years of her career.

She was a musician/performer with the percussion group "Ichodrasi". While still modeling, she studied acting at Theatre Embros, physical and devised theatre at So7 and political sciences and history at Panteion University.

Mara was member of "ANASA" the first non-profit organisation for nutritional disorders in Greece.

In March 2007, she was awarded "Model of the Year" in Greece.

== Personal life ==
From 2005 to 2008 Darmousli was married to Muay Thai fighter Pavlos Kaponis. They have a son, Angelos (b. 2006).
Since 2020, Darmousli has been married to chef Vasilis Tsatsakis and they have a son, Michalis (b. 2022).

== Filmography, television roles, and appearances ==
In 2005, Darmousli started acting appearing in the Greek film I Kardia Tou Ktinous (The Heart of the Beast) based on the novel by Petros Tatsopoulos, "Luton" and "Love, Love, Love".

Her TV experience includes appearances on the series "Mehri tris einai Desmos" (ALTER), "To Kokkino Domatio" (MEGA) and most recently three episodes "Agria Paidia" (MEGA), "3os Nomos" (MEGA), "Heroides" (MEGA), "To soi sou" (ALPHA) and currently "Gynaika Xwris Onoma" (ANT1).

In theater, "Life after Low Flights" directed by D.Agoras(2019–20),"Astra Na Pane" directed by N.Magdalinos (2018–19), "The Game of Love and Chance" directed by E.Manios (2018–19),"The 39 Steps" directed by S.Spantidas (2017–18),"Oedipus Tree" directed by K.Gakis (2017–18), "Dangerous Liaisons" directed by G.Kimoulis (2016–17),"Wonderful War" by T.Dardaganis (2016–17),"Lahana & Hahana" musical by T.Ioannides (2016–17), "Prometheus Bounded" by J.Falkonis (2016),"Agents" by A.Remoundos (2015), "Trio Reich" by T.Dardaganis (2015), "The Woman In Black" by T.Dardaganis (2014–15),"Freedom in Medea" by K.Filippoglou (2013–14). Assistant Director for C.Theodoridis "Parthenon" (2012), J.Moschou "The Debris" (2013), K.Filippoglou "Tirza" (2014).

She co-hosted the TV show "Εχουμε και λεμε" (Let's talk) for ET1 from 2008 to 2009, along with Rika Vagianni, Renia Louizidou, Manina Zoumpoulaki, and Marion Michelidaki.

== Agencies ==
- IMG, Paris
- The Fashion Model Management, Milan
- Next Model Management, London / N.Y
- Place Model Management, Hamburg
- Wiener Models, Wien
- Time Models, Zurich
- East West Models
- Chic Management
