= Fernanda Figueroa =

Costa Rican footballer (born 1997)

Personal information
- Full name: María Fernanda Figueroa Figueroa
- Date of birth: 22 June 1997 (age 29)
- Place of birth: Río Claro, Costa Rica
- Position: Forward

Team information
- Current team: Dimas Escazú
- Number: 21

Senior career*
Years	Team	Apps	(Gls)
2020–	Dimas Escazú	20	(22)

International career^{‡}
2021–	Costa Rica	2	(0)
- * Club domestic league appearances and goals as of 9 July 2021 ‡ National team caps and goals as of 15 June 2021

María Fernanda Figueroa Figueroa (born 22 June 1997), known as Fernanda Figueroa, is a Costa Rican footballer who plays as a forward for Dimas Escazú and the Costa Rica women's national team.

== Early life ==
Figueroa and her five siblings were raised by their grandmother after their mother abandoned the family. She began playing football in her youth and looked up to Karla Villalobos as an inspiration.

== Club career ==
Figueroa has played for Dimas Escazú in Costa Rica. She led the league in scoring in 2020 with 22 goals.

== International career ==
Figueroa made her senior debut for Costa Rica on 13 June 2021 as a 69th-minute substitution in a 0–0 friendly away draw against Guatemala.
