= Julia Saner =

Swiss model (born 1992)

- Born: February 19, 1992 (age 34); Bern, Switzerland
- Citizenship: Switzerland
- Occupation: Model
- Years active: 2006–present
- Modeling information
- Height: 1.81 m (5 ft 11 in)
- Hair color: dark brown
- Eye color: green
- Agency: Ford Models Brasil; Premier Model Management; Mega Models; Women Management

Julia Saner (born February 19, 1992) is a Swiss model. She celebrated her first international success in 2006 as Tap Dance Junior World Champion in the category "Junior Small Group". In 2009, she won International Elle Model Look contest.

== Early life ==
Julia Saner was born on February 19, 1992, in Bern, Switzerland, but currently residing in United Kingdom.

== Career ==
Julia debut in 2010 when she walked for Gucci at the spring show in Milan. She has also walked for Fendi, Moschino, D&G, Roberto Cavalli, MaxMara and Salvatore Ferrgarno. Julia works modeling with several agencies as Elite Stockholm, Model Management Hamburg, Elite Copenhagen, Elite Barcelona, Elite London and Elite Paris.

== Awards ==
- International Elle Model Look contest (2009)
