= Manasvi Mamgai =

Indian model

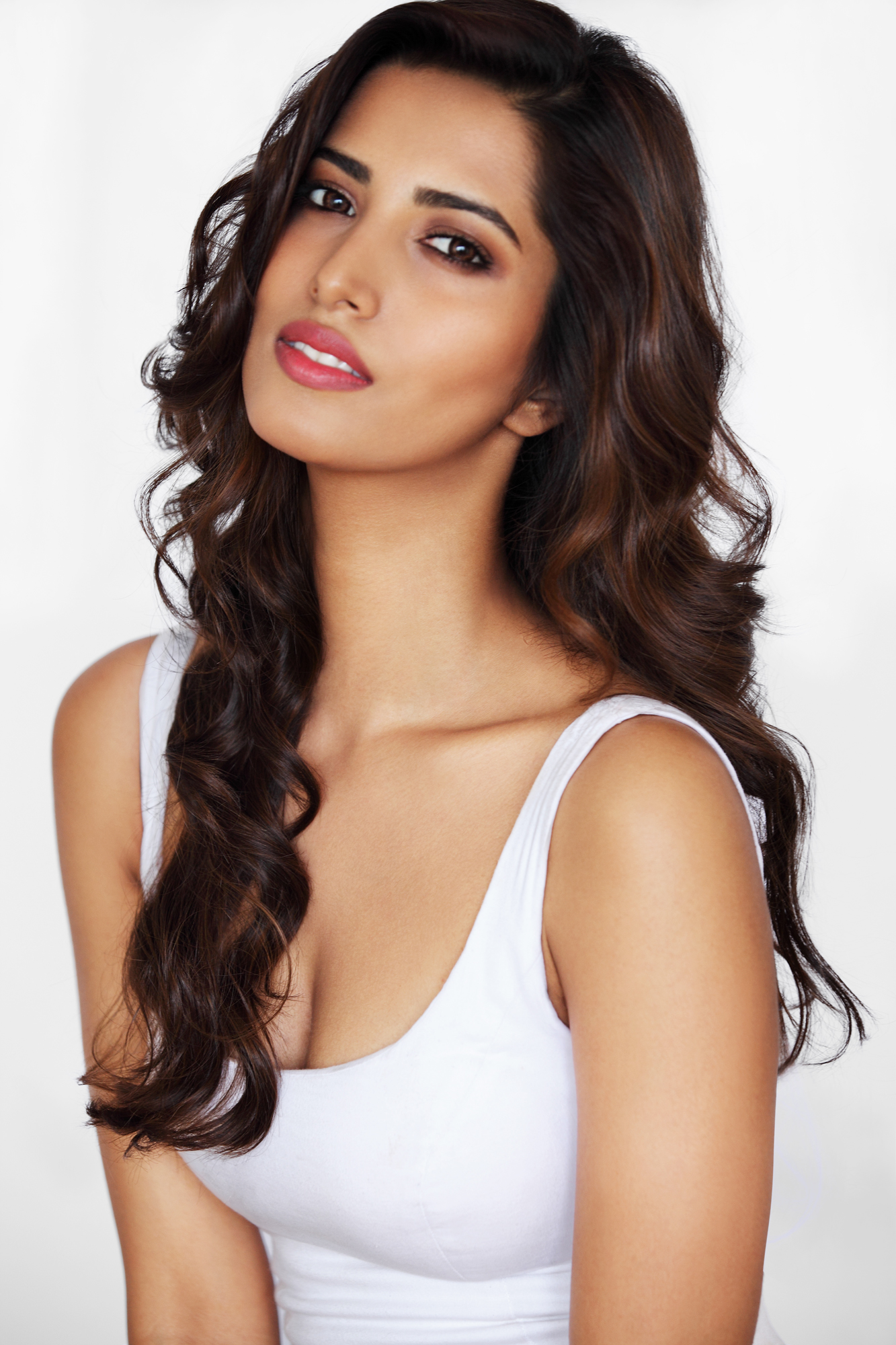
- Born: New Delhi, India
- Education: Hansraj Public School, Panchkula, Haryana
- Occupations: Model; actress; social worker
- Beauty pageant titleholder
- Title: Elite Model Look India 2006; Miss Tourism International 2008; Femina Miss India World 2010

Manasvi Mamgai is a former Miss India, actress, film producer and philanthropist. She appeared as a contestant on Bigg Boss 17 in 2023 and later expanded into film production, co-founding 32RED Entertainment and producing Captivated.

== Early life ==
Mamgai was born in Delhi and grew up in Chandigarh. Her mother Prabha, was from Uttarakhand.

By the age of 15, she had won around 50 state and national awards in dancing, singing, and skating.

== Beauty pageants and modelling ==
Mamgai won Elite Model Look India in 2006, debuted at India Fashion Week and won Miss Tourism International 2008. She was chosen as Miss India 2010 and represented India at the 2010 Miss World beauty pageant in China. She was chosen in the top eight in the Miss World Finale in 2010 in the Dances of the world. Since then, she has modelled for Indian designers and shot various campaigns, including for Indian and international magazines such as Vogue, Elle, Femina, Verve, Cosmopolitan and New Face, and Code of Style.

== Film and TV ==
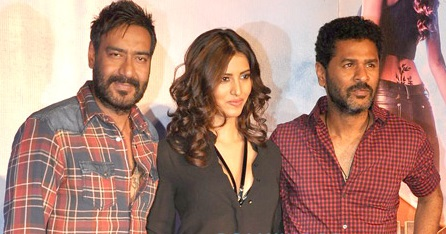
Ajay Devgn, Mamgai and Prabhu Deva at the promotional event of their film, Action Jackson

=== Acting ===
Mamgai is an alumnus of Anupam Kher's acting school in Mumbai. In 2012 she was a part of the movement-based play, LIMBO, that received critical reviews. It was showcased in Prithvi Theatre in Mumbai and screened in Paris. The same year she appeared in the documentary The World Before Her.

In 2014 she played the antagonist, Marina, opposite Ajay Devgn in the Eros International studio movie Action Jackson, directed by Prabhu Deva. Mamgai appeared in the Indian comedy show Comedy Nights with Kapil along with her Action Jackson cast. In 2015, she was nominated for the Best Debutant award at Filmfare Awards where she was also a presenter. In 2020, she was lead of the music videos, "Yaadein" by American R&B duo TheMxxnlight and "Dum ba Dum" by Daler Mehndi.

Mamgai moved to Los Angeles to pursue opportunities in acting and producing. In 2021, she was a winner on the American game show The Price Is Right.

She played the role of Juhi Bhatia alongside Kajol in The Trial in 2023 on Disney+ Hotstar. She entered the Salman Khan-hosted reality game show Bigg Boss 17 as a wild-card contestant in October 2023. In 2024, she appeared as Monica in the third season of Fuh Se Fantasy on JioCinema.

=== Producing ===
Mamgai co-founded the production company 32RED Entertainment with producer Michael Mammoliti in 2021. She is a producer of Captivated, directed by Dito Montiel and starring Al Pacino and Katie Holmes. In 2025, Mamgai and Pacino met Pope Leo XIV at the Vatican ahead of filming for the movie in Rome.

== Advocacy & Philanthropy ==
=== Humanity against terrorism concert ===
Mamgai put together the "Humanity United against Terror" a Bollywood Charity Concert which took place on 15 October 2016 at NJ Exposition center in Edison, New Jersey. The concert was addressed by President-Elect Donald Trump. She even performed in it with Bollywood celebrities including Malaika Arora, Prabhu Deva, Sophie Choudry.

=== Presidential inauguration performance ===
Mamgai, along with Bollywood singing sensation Mika Singh, performed at 2017 pre-inaugural Welcome Celebrations at Lincoln Memorial in Washington DC. She led over a dozen Indian dancers performing to popular Bollywood numbers including the Oscar-winning "Jai Ho" of A R Rahman. The live event was played in front of 800,000 people and was telecast to over 2 billion viewers worldwide. Mamgai attended other Inaugural functions, including Trump's VIP Candle Light Dinner at Union Station.

=== Diwali celebrations at The Oval office ===
Mamgai attended the first time celebration of Diwali at The Oval Office in the presence of President Donald Trump on 17 October 2017. She is active in the RHC Immigration campaign to have equitable treatment for DALCA kids (300,000 legal childhood arrivals from India who lose their status at the age of 21) and reduce the Green Card backlog of hi-skilled legal immigrants based on merit.

=== South Asians in Media & Arts Foundation ===
Mamgai is the founder and a board member of the South Asians in Media & Arts Foundation (SAMA), a nonprofit organization focused on education, mentorship and opportunities for South Asian creatives in film, television, music and other creative fields. In 2026, she launched the SAMA Podcast, featuring conversations with entrepreneurs, artists and other professionals.
