= Danijela Dimitrovska =

Serbian model

- Born: 22 April 1987 (age 38); Požarevac, SFR Yugoslavia
- Spouse: Ognjen Amidžić (m. 2012; div. 2022) Jevrem Kosnić (m. 2026)
- Children: 1
- Modeling information
- Height: 1.78 m (5 ft 10 in)
- Hair color: Brown
- Eye color: Black
- Agency: IMG Models (New York, Paris, Milan); Elite Model Management (Amsterdam, Barcelona, Copenhagen); Louisa Models (Munich); MP Stockholm (Stockholm)

Danijela Dimitrovska (Serbian Cyrillic: Данијела Димитровска; Serbian pronunciation: [danijɛ̌ːla dimitrɔ̌ʋskaː]; born 22 April 1987) is a Serbian model. She began her modelling career by winning the Elite Model Look competition in Serbia in 2004.

== Career ==
=== Modeling ===
Dimitrovska began her professional career as a model in 2004, aged 16, by winning the Elite Model Look competition in Serbia. She has since been a spokesperson for various brands, such as Vera Wang, Anne Fontaine, Benetton, BCBG Max Azria, Christian Lacroix, French Connection, Leonard, Marella, Miu Miu, Betty Jackson, YSL and Louis Vuitton. Some of her campaigns also include Emporio Armani, when she posed along with Giorgio Armani and other models for the Italian edition Marie Claire, and a television commercial for YSL with French actor Vincent Cassel.

In November 2009, Dimitrovska was chosen as one of promotional models for Victoria's Secret. She had her first photo session in April 2010.

=== Other work ===
In 2011, Dimitrovska founded her own modeling agency, Models Inc., along with fellow model Marija Vujović and modeling agent Mirjana Udovičić. Since 2012, the agency has organized Elite Model Look competitions in Serbia and Montenegro.

== Personal life ==
On 26 May 2012, Dimitrovska married Serbian television personality and musician Ognjen Amidžić. Their first child, a son Matija, was born on 29 November 2013. Dimitrovska is close friends with Brazilian model Gisele Bündchen.

== See also ==
- List of Victoria's Secret models
