= Dipti Srinivasan =

Singaporean electrical engineer

Dipti Srinivasan is a Singaporean electrical engineer whose research involves renewable energy and smart grids. She is a professor in the Department of Electrical & Computer Engineering and director of the Centre for Green Energy Management & Smart Grid at the National University of Singapore.

== Education and career ==
Srinivasan worked for the Rajasthan State Electricity Board in Jaipur, India, from 1986 to 1989, before pursuing graduate studies in electrical engineering at the National University of Singapore. She earned a master's degree there in 1991 and completed a Ph.D. in 1994.

After postdoctoral study at the University of California, Berkeley, she returned to the National University of Singapore as a professor in 1995.

== Recognition ==
Srinivasan was named an IEEE Fellow, in the 2020 class of fellows, "for contributions to computational intelligence for Smart Grid". She is the 2022 recipient of the IEEE Power Engineering Society Wanda Reder Pioneer in Power Award, given "for her leadership and valuable contributions to the power engineering profession, education, and excellent volunteerism".
