= Simona Andrejić =

Serbian fashion model (born 1994)

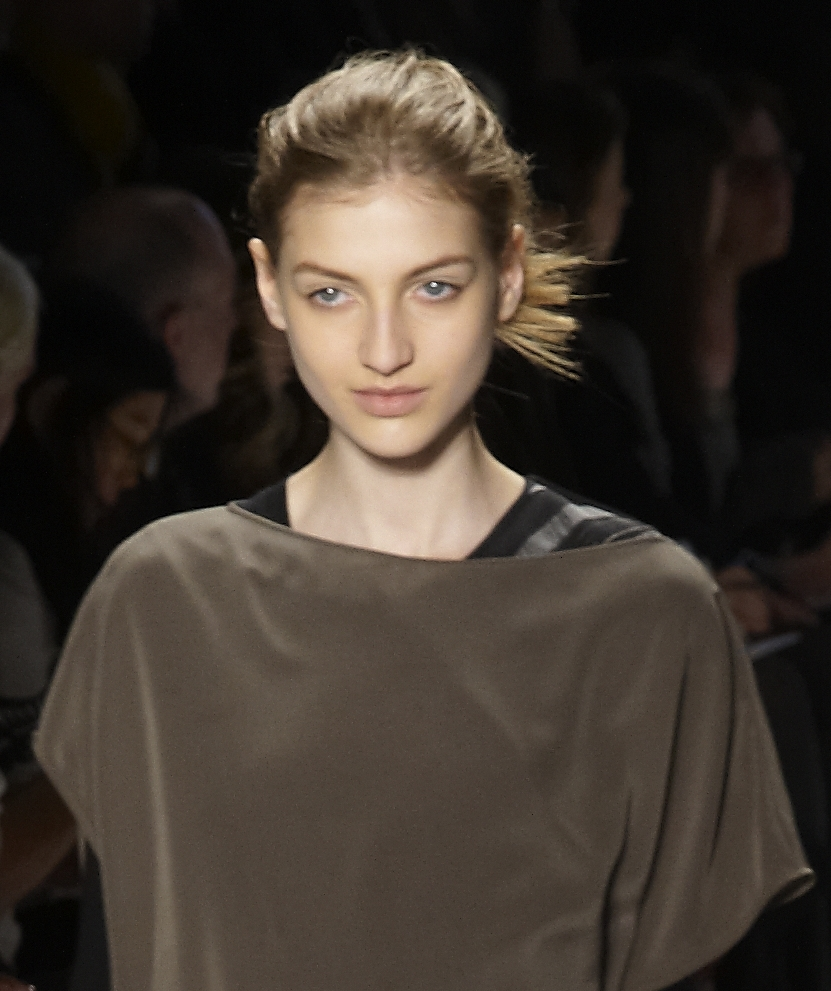
- Andrejić walks for BCBG Max Azria in 2010
- Born: Simona Andrejić; 14 August 1994 (age 32); Belgrade, FR Yugoslavia
- Modeling information
- Height: 1.80 m (5 ft 11 in)
- Hair color: Blonde
- Eye color: Blue / green

Simona Andrejić (Serbian Cyrillic: Симона Андрејић; born 14 August 1994 in Belgrade) is a Serbian top fashion model.

== Career ==
She was the winner of the 2009 Serbian Elite Model Look and she placed in top 15 on Elite Model Look International 2009. She speaks Serbian, Russian, English and Spanish language. Simona has walked the runway for Calvin Klein, Gucci, Chanel, Gianfranco Ferré, Dolce & Gabbana, Christian Dior, Lanvin and others. She shot for Elite model look logo for 2010, NUMERO, Russh and Cosmopolitan. She has appeared on the covers of Serbian Elle in 2010, 2011, 2012, 2013, 2014 & 2015
