= Ximena Huilipán =

Chilean model and actress (born 1986)

Ximena Huilipán Muñoz (born September 19, 1986) is a Chilean model and actress of Mapuche descent.

== Career ==
At 14 years of age, Huilipán won the Elite Model Look Chile 2002 contest. She was discovered by Dominican fashion designer Oscar de la Renta for whom she modeled after having won the Elite Model Look Chile 2002. During her early career she also modeled for Carolina Herrera and was cast in a minor role in Jorge Olguín's movie Sangre eterna. Later she moved further into an actor career playing a role as Lautaro's wife in a historical movie about the Arauco War between Spaniards and Mapuches. She has been called "the Mapuche model" several times in the written press, but does not embody the stereotypical physical Mapuche characteristics.

== Filmography ==
- Eternal Blood aka Sangre Eterna (2002) - Vampire

== See also ==
- Caroline Ribeiro
- Bruna Tenório
