= Sheetal Mallar =

Indian fashion model from Mumbai (born 1974)

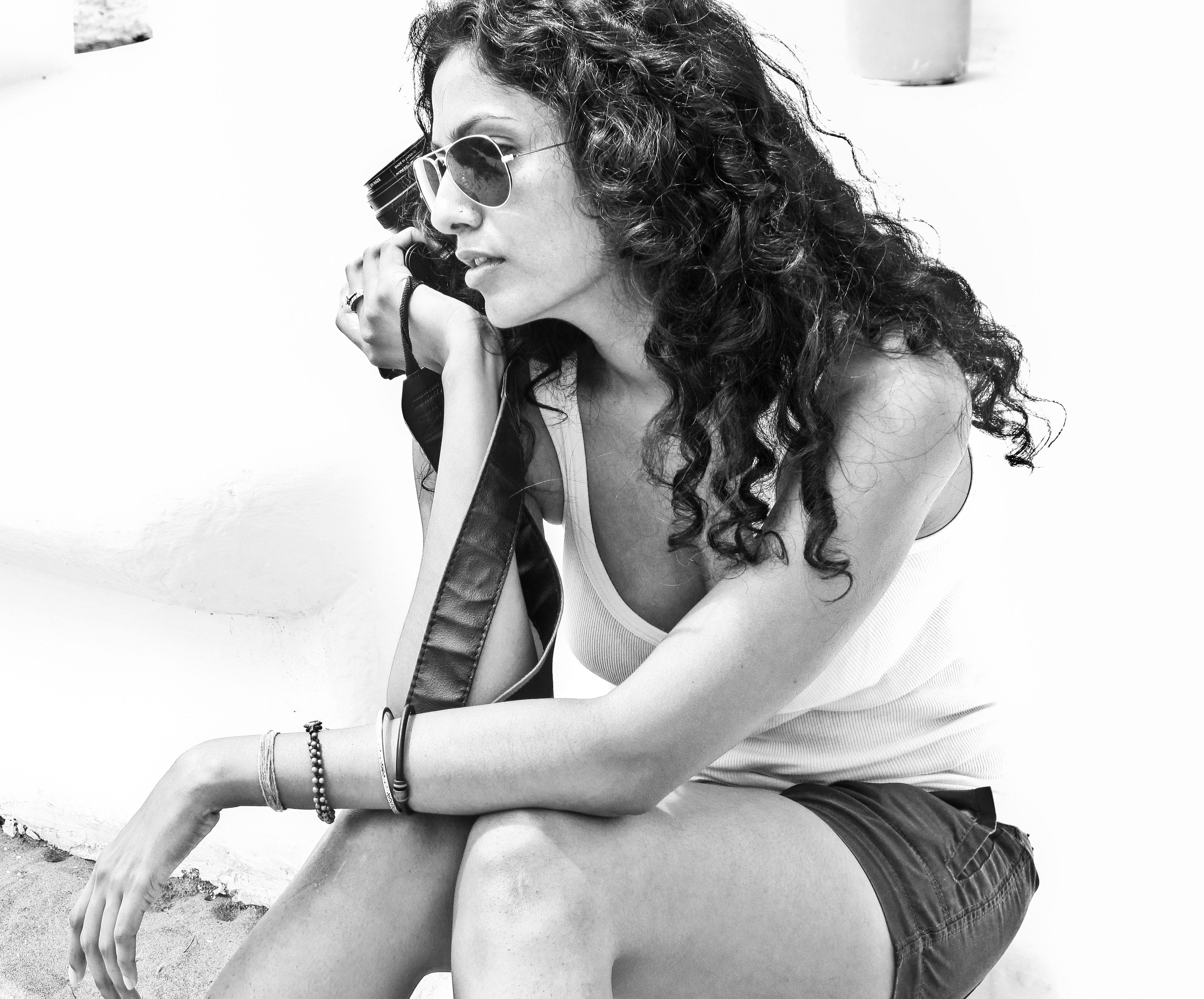
- Sheetal Mallar
- Born: 23 April 1974 (age 50); Mumbai, Maharashtra, India
- Modeling information
- Height: 5 ft 10 in (1.78 m)
- Hair color: Black
- Eye color: Black

Sheetal Mallar (born 23 April 1974) is an Indian fashion model from Mumbai. She is now also a contemporary Indian photographer. See her official website here. She won the Femina Look of the Year and the Elite Look of the Year in 1994.

== Early life ==
Mallar was born in Mumbai, India. Her parents hail from a Tulu speaking Billava (Poojary) family Padubidri, Mangalore, and her father is a lawyer. She went to Canossa Convent, Mumbai, pursued her B.Com at Sydenham College, Mumbai, and discontinued in her third year.

== Modeling career ==
Mallar's first shoot was for Danabhai Jewellers. She was placed among the 12 finalists in the Elite Supermodel Contest held in 1994 and worked for Armani and Fendi. She is the face of Maybelline cosmetics.

== Personal life ==
Mallar was married to Italian tennis player Mosé Navarra for three years.
