= Mathilde Frachon =

French model (born 1990)

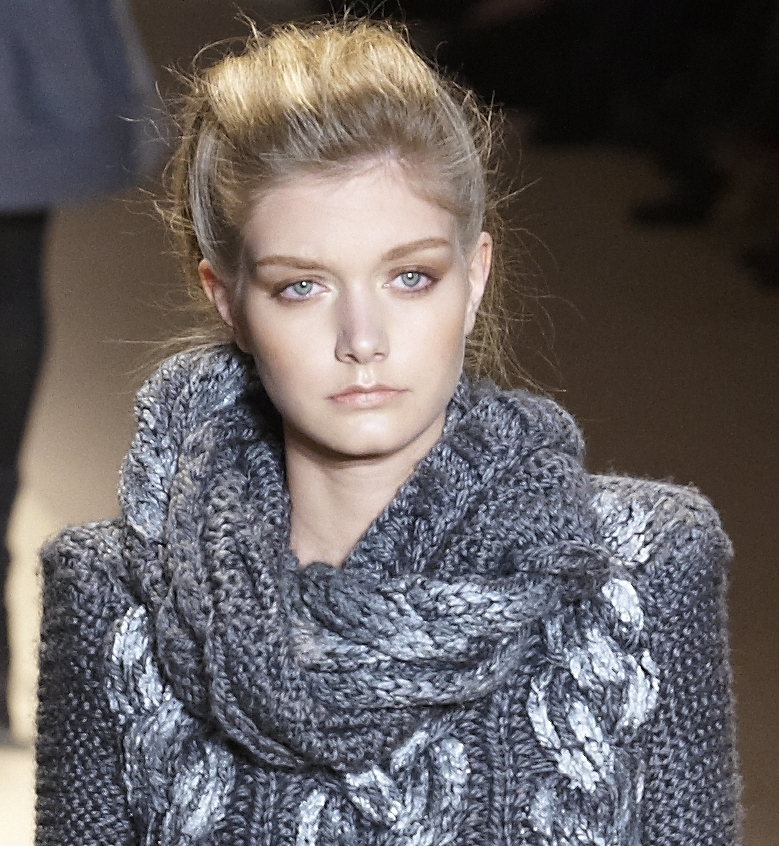
- Frachon walks for ADAM in 2010
- Born: 16 February 1990 (age 36); Paris
- Occupation: Model
- Modeling information
- Height: 5 ft 10 in (178 cm)
- Hair color: blonde
- Eye color: bluish green
- Agency: IMG Models (Paris, London); Next Model Management (Milan); Traffic Models (Barcelona); M4 Models (Hamburg); Two Management (Los Angeles)

Mathilde Frachon is a French fashion model.

== Early life ==
Mathilde was born in Paris on 16 February 1992. She got scouted in the street of Paris, and started modeling. Right after, models.com named Mathilde "Model of the Week".

== Career ==
She debuted at the fall Charlotte Ronson show in New York, and also walked for 3.1 Phillip Lim, DKNY, and Jill Stuart. She opened the fall Ossie Clark show in London, and also walked for Dolce & Gabbana, Moschino Cheap & Chic, Giambattista Valli, Karl Lagerfeld, and Kenzo in Milan and Paris. The following fashion week, she also walked for numerous brands including Proenza Schouler, Marc Jacobs, Armani, Sonia Rykiel, Kenzo, Karl Lagerfeld and Elie Saab.

She appeared in her first Teen Vogue editorial photographed by Lachlan Bailey and shortly after in her first French Vogue editorial photographed by Victor Demarchelier. She has shot for numerous prestigious magazines and covers such as Vogue Spain, Vogue Japan, Vogue Taiwan, Elle USA, Elle China, Marie Claire France and UK, Interview, Harper's Bazaar China, Nylon, French Revues Des Modes. She works for brands such as Victoria's Secret Bloomingdale's, Saks Fifth Avenue, Free People, Gap Inc., Cerruti, and DKNY.

== Personal life ==
Mathilde's hobbies include extreme sports, music, art and fashion. She loves doing pilates and cardio to stay in shape.

== See also ==
- "Mathilde Frachon". Fashion Model Directory..
- "Mathilde Frachon @ Next : “I always been passionate by fashion”". All About Models. Retrieved February 4, 2016.
