= Fall 2008 fashion weeks =

Major fall 2008 fashion weeks were held in New York City, London, Paris, and Milan during February and March 2008.

== New York Fashion Week ==
The Fall 2008 New York Fashion Week, officially called Mercedes-Benz Fashion Week, was held between February 1 and February 8, 2008.

=== Participating designers ===
This list includes shows on the official schedule(note [a] ) and those reviewed at style.com(note [b] ).

- 3.1 Phillip Lim^{[a]}
- Abaeté^{[a]}^{[b]}
- Academy of Art University^{[a]}
- ADAM^{[b]}
- Akiko Ogawa^{[a]}
- Alexander Wang^{[b]}
- Alexandre Herchcovitch^{[a]}^{[b]}
- Angel Sanchez^{[a]}
- Anna Sui^{[a]}
- Anne Bowen^{[a]}
- Araks^{[a]}
- Badgley Mischka^{[a]}
- BCBG Max Azria^{[a]}^{[b]}
- Betsey Johnson^{[a]}
- Bill Blass^{[a]}
- Boy by Band of Outsiders^{[b]}
- Calvin Klein^{[a]}
- Carlos Miele^{[a]}
- Carmen Marc Valvo^{[a]}
- Carolina Herrera^{[a]}
- Chris Han^{[a]}
- Custo Barcelona^{[a]}
- Cynthia Steffe^{[a]}
- Dennis Basso^{[a]}
- Diane von Fürstenberg^{[a]}
- Diesel^{[a]}
- DKNY^{[a]}
- Donna Karan Collection^{[a]}
- Duckie Brown^{[a]}
- Elie Tahari^{[b]}
- Erin Fetherston^{[a]}
- Herve Leger^{[a]} by Max Azria
- Iodice^{[a]}
- Jayson Brunsdon^{[a]}
- Jill Stuart^{[a]}
- Joanna Mastroianni^{[a]}
- Juan Carlos Obando^{[a]}
- Lacoste^{[a]}
- Lela Rose^{[a]}
- Malan Breton^{[a]}
- Mara Hoffman^{[a]}
- Matthew Williamson^{[a]}
- Max Azria^{[a]}
- Milly by Michelle Smith^{[a]}
- Miss Sixty^{[a]}
- Monique Lhuillier^{[a]}
- Na Be by Victorya Hong^{[a]}
- Naeem Khan^{[a]}
- Nanette Lepore^{[a]}
- Nautica^{[a]}
- Nicole Miller^{[a]}
- Pamella Roland^{[a]}
- Perry Ellis^{[a]}
- Peter Som^{[a]}
- Ports 1961^{[a]}
- Project Runway^{[a]}
- R. Scott French^{[a]}
- Rachel Roy^{[b]}
- Ralph Lauren^{[a]}
- Rebecca Taylor^{[a]}
- Reem Acra^{[a]}
- Richard Chai^{[a]}
- Rock & Republic^{[a]}
- Rubin Singer^{[a]}
- sass & bide^{[a]}
- Sean John^{[a]}
- Tadashi Shoji^{[a]}
- Temperley London^{[a]}
- Terexov^{[a]}
- Tibi^{[a]}
- Tommy Hilfiger^{[a]}
- Tony Cohen^{[a]}
- Tracy Reese^{[a]}
- Tuleh^{[a]}
- Twinkle by Wenlan^{[a]}
- Venexiana^{[a]}
- Vera Wang^{[a]}
- Vera Wang Lavender Label^{[b]}
- Verrier^{[a]}
- Vivienne Tam^{[a]}
- Willow^{[a]}
- Y-3^{[a]}
- Yeohlee^{[a]}
- Yigal Azrouel^{[a]}
- Z Zegna^{[a]}
- Zac Posen^{[a]}
- Zang Toi^{[a]}

== London Fashion Week ==
| Clothing line | Date | Notes | Link |
|---|---|---|---|
| Allegra Hicks | February 15 | | |
| Amanda Wakeley | February 11 | | |
| Aminaka Wilmont | February 15 | | |
| Ann-Sofie Back | February 10 | | |
| Antoni & Alison | February 14 | | |
| Aquascutum | February 12 | | |
| Armand Basi | February 13 | | |
| Ashish | February 14 | | |
| Asprey | February 14 | | |
| Basso & Brooke | February 12 | | |
| Ben de Lisi | February 10 | | |
| Betty Jackson | February 12 | | |
| Biba | February 10 | | |
| Bora Aksu | February 13 | | |
| Caroline Charles | February 10 | | |
| Central Saint Martins | February 15 | | |
| Christopher Kane | February 12 | | |
| Duro Olowu | February 12 | | |
| Eley Kishimoto | February 11 | | |
| Emma Cook | February 11 | | |
| Erdem | February 14 | | |
| Fashion East | February 13 | | |
| Gareth Pugh | February 13 | | |
| Gavin Douglas | February 15 | | |
| Giles | February 13 | | |
| Graeme Black | February 15 | | |
| House of Holland | February 13 | | |
| Issa | February 14 | | |
| Jaeger London | February 10 | | |
| Jasper Conran | February 11 | | |
| Jean-Pierre Braganza | February 10 | | |
| Jenny Packham | February 14 | | |
| Jens Laugesen | February 13 | | |
| John Rocha | February 11 | | |
| Julien MacDonald | February 15 | | |
| Krystof Strozyna | February 12 | | |
| Louise Goldin | February 11 | | |
| Luella | February 14 | | |
| MAN | February 15 | | |
| Margaret Howell | February 14 | | |
| Marios Schwab | February 12 | | |
| MeadhamKirchoff | February 12 | | |
| Modernist | February 10 | | |
| Nathan Jenden | February 12 | | |
| Nicole Farhi | February 13 | | |
| Osman Yousefzada | February 10 | | |
| Paul Costelloe | February 10 | | |
| Paul Smith | February 11 | | |
| Peter Jensen | February 15 | | |
| PPQ | February 11 | | |
| Richard Nicoll | February 13 | | |
| Rodnik | February 13 | | |
| Roksanda Ilincic | February 13 | | |
| Sinha-Stanic | February 11 | | |
| Todd Lynn | February 12 | | |
| Unconditional | February 15 | | |
| Vivienne Westwood Red Label | February 14 | | |

Source: official fashion week schedule.

== Paris Fashion Week ==
| Clothing line | Date | Notes | Link |
|---|---|---|---|
| AF Vandevorst | February 24 | | |
| Agnès B. | February 29 | | |
| Alena Akhmadullina | February 29 | | |
| Alexander McQueen | February 29 | | |
| Atsuro Tayama | February 25 | | |
| Akris | February 27 | | |
| Andrew Gn | February 27 | | |
| Ann Demeulemeester | February 26 | | |
| Balenciaga | February 26 | | |
| Balmain | February 24 | | |
| Bernhard Willhelm | February 27 | | |
| Bless | February 24 | | |
| Bruno Pieters | February 24 | | |
| Burfitt | February 23 | | |
| Chado Ralph Rucci | March 2 | | |
| Chapurin | March 2 | | |
| Chanel | February 29 | | |
| Chloé | March 1 | | |
| Christian Dior | February 25 | | |
| Christian Lacroix | February 27 | | |
| Collette Dinnigan | March 2 | | |
| Comme des Garçons | February 26 | | |
| Commuun | March 1 | | |
| Costume National | February 27 | | |
| Devastee | February 23 | | |
| Dresscamp | February 24 | | |
| Dries van Noten | February 27 | | |
| Elie Saab | March 1 | | |
| Emanuel Ungaro | February 27 | | |
| Es Orchestres | February 29 | | |
| Fatima Lopes | February 23 | | |
| Gaspard Yurkievich | February 25 | | |
| Givenchy | February 27 | | |
| Hermès | March 1 | | |
| Hussein Chalayan | February 27 | | |
| Impasse de la Defense | February 23 | | |
| Isabel Marant | February 25 | | |
| Issey Miyake | February 26 | | |
| Jean-Charles de Castelbajac | February 29 | | |
| Jean Paul Gaultier | February 26 | | |
| Jefen | February 24 | | |
| John Galliano | March 1 | | |
| Jose Castro | February 29 | | |
| Junko Shimada | February 29 | | |
| Junya Watanabe | February 26 | | |
| Karl Lagerfeld | February 27 | | |
| Kenzo | March 1 | | |
| Lanvin | March 2 | | |
| Lie Sang Bong | February 24 | | |
| Limi Feu | March 1 | | |
| Loewe | February 26 | | |
| Louis Vuitton | March 2 | | |
| Lutz | February 26 | | |
| Maison Martin Margiela | February 25 | | |
| Manish Arora | February 24 | | |
| Marithe and François Girbaud | February 26 | | |
| Martin Grant | March 1 | | |
| Michel Klein | February 24 | | |
| Miu Miu | March 2 | | |
| Moon Young Hee | March 2 | | |
| Nina Ricci | March 2 | | |
| Paul & Joe | March 1 | | |
| Rajesh Pratap Singh | February 24 | | |
| Requiem | February 27 | | |
| Rick Owens | February 24 | | |
| Robert Normand | February 25 | | |
| Rue du Mail by Martine Sitbon | February 29 | | |
| Sakina M'sa | March 2 | | |
| Sharon Wauchob | February 25 | | |
| Sonia Rykiel | February 29 | | |
| Stella Cadente | February 23 | | |
| Tsumori Chisato | February 26 | | |
| Undercover | February 25 | | |
| Vanessa Bruno | March 2 | | |
| Veronique Branquinho | February 26 | | |
| Veronique Leroy | February 25 | | |
| Viktor & Rolf | February 26 | | |
| Vivienne Westwood | February 25 | | |
| Wunderkind | March 1 | | |
| Yohji Yamamoto | February 25 | | |
| Yuki Torii | March 2 | | |

Source: Official fashion week schedule. Some dates to be confirmed.

== Los Angeles Fashion Week ==
Fall '08 collections are shown from March 7 - March 14

=== Designs featured ===
- Reiss
- JMARY
- Jesse Kamm
- Le Sang des Betes by Trang Chau
- Erin Fetherston
- Jack Rabbit Collection
- John Varvatos
- Maxine Dillon
- Yotom Solomon
- Wren
- Zachariah Bryant
- Future Fashion LA
- LI CARI designed by Jazmin Whitley
- Sue Wong
- Jared Gold
- ENDOVANERA
- UNIF
- The Battalion
- Mike Vensel
- Elizabeth Mason Couture
- Gregory Parkinson

Mercedes-Benz Fashion Week at Smashbox Studios

- Alexis La Montagna
- Ashley Paige
- Bow & Arrow by Alan Del Rosario
- Elmer Ave.
- Falguni Shane Peacock
- Farah Angsana
- IMASU by Kelly Nishimoto
- Jenny Han
- Joseph Domingo
- Julia Clancey
- Lauren Conrad Collection
- Maggie Barry for Xubáz
- Monarchy Collection
- Nicholai
- Octavio Carlin
- Orthodox
- Pussycat Dolls by Robin Antin
- Samora
- SUH-TAHN
- Veronika Jeanvie
- Whitley Kros

THE GREEN INITIATIVE Humanitarian Fashion Show

- Lilikoi Clothing by Barbara Boswell
- Vintage China by Deacon Yu and Andrew Wong
- Lady Muse by Mathilde
- Andira Rain Tees by Beth Doane
- M the Movement by Michael "M" Hererra
- Rene Geneva Design by Rene Geneva

Source: fashionweekla.com calendar

=== LA Fashion Week 2008 controversy ===
In 2008, there were numerous celebrity fashion designers showcasing their designs at LA's Fashion Week. Many people believed that, because of this new surge of "celebs-as-trendsetters", some fashion regulars and legitimate designers did not attend the 2008 fashion event. Instead, attendees turned their attention to the designs of "The Hills" star Lauren Conrad, who debuted her collection during the week, Nicky Hilton, and The Pussycat Dolls.

Sue Wong was one of the designers that openly voiced her opinion about celebrity designers. Wong calls the emerging trend "absolutely bogus". Wong is usually a regular at the Mercedes-Benz LA Fashion Week, but decided not to show in 2008, claiming she wanted to concentrate on doing something "different". "Sure, every celebrity and his brother wants to be a fashion designer", said Wong, who has been designing since 1968. "It's not like anybody can pick it up and do it. It's a science. You need to know fit and construction." Wong has also claimed that the celebrities are just capitalizing on their "15 minutes of fame". Normally, up-and-coming designers would not get the kind of exposures celebrities get for their clothing lines.

Lauren Conrad has tried to defend herself against the criticisms and pressures put on her before her fashion launch. Conrad, who has trained at the Fashion Institute of Design and Merchandising in Los Angeles, said the additional pressure thrust upon her Fashion Week debut made her nervous while working on the line. She described it as "California chic", basing this season on a recent trip to Paris reflected in simple, clean pieces accessorized with berets, netting, leather gloves, bows and lace."I will probably never have the respect I want in the fashion industry, but I can work hard every day to try and prove myself", Conrad said. "Can I really be criticized for taking advantage on an opportunity that allows me to have what I've always wanted?"

Wong still voiced her skepticism. "Let's see whether she can survive and thrive. It takes so much dedication", she said. "You gotta really pay your dues to be a serious artist." A review by Jenny Peters of Fashion Wire Daily criticized her debut line, writing, "There was absolutely nothing new or innovative in her collection."

== See also ==
Spring 2008 New York Fashion Week
