= List of Fall 2008 New York Fashion Week fashion shows =

This is a list of Fall 2008 New York Fashion Week fashion shows. This list includes shows on the official schedule (^{[a]} ) and those reviewed at style.com (^{[b]} ).

Clothing line	Date	Notes	Link
3.1 Phillip Lim^{[a]}	February 6		
Abaeté^{[a]}^{[b]}	February 2	A gray palette inspired by medieval armor. Understated (even "anonymous"), commercially appealing clothing.	
Academy of Art University^{[a]}	February 2		
ADAM^{[b]}	February 3	A Ralph Lauren-esque collection of hand-knit sweaters and other country-style clothing.	
Akiko Ogawa^{[a]}	February 2		
Alexander Wang^{[b]}	February 2	Mixed masculine and feminine "sexy-tough" pieces, with oversized garments paired with slim-fitting, slinky ones. The show included the designer's eveningwear debut as well as a collection of bags.	
Alexandre Herchcovitch^{[a]}^{[b]}	February 2	A geometry-inspired, architectural collection. Elements of "sixties futurism and boxy menswear-inflected tailoring".	
Angel Sanchez^{[a]}	February 3		
Anna Sui^{[a]}	February 6		
Anne Bowen^{[a]}	February 8		
Araks^{[a]}	February 2		
Badgley Mischka^{[a]}	February 5		
BCBG Max Azria^{[a]}^{[b]}	February 1	The collection was more mature-looking than in previous seasons, with neutral colors, jersey dresses, and crisp tailoring. Most looks were cinched with tough-looking belts.	
Betsey Johnson^{[a]}	February 4		
Bill Blass^{[a]}	February 7		
Boy by Band of Outsiders^{[b]}	January 31	Schoolgirl style with Scottish inspiration. Romantic touches, including luxurious coats. The show was a presentation set in a "1940s living room that looked like it had been invaded by a Scottish forest".	
Calvin Klein^{[a]}	February 7		
Carlos Miele^{[a]}	February 6		
Carmen Marc Volvo^{[a]}	February 8		
Carolina Herrera^{[a]}	February 4		
Charles Nolan^{[b]}	February 3	A collection influenced by Marie Antoinette and Jackie Kennedy, with 18th-century mesh and taffeta mixed with 1960s coats and suits.	
Chris Han^{[a]}	February 7		
Costello Tagliapietra^{[b]}	February 2	Draped dresses influenced by 1940s film noir and the dark fairy-tale illustrations of Arthur Rackham and Gustaf Tenggren. The waist is emphasized.	
Custo Barcelona^{[a]}	February 7		
Cynthia Steffe^{[a]}	February 5		
Dennis Basso^{[a]}	February 5		
Diane von Fürstenberg^{[a]}^{[b]}	February 3	1940s-influenced tailored clothing, mainly separates.	
Diesel^{[a]}	February 5		
DKNY^{[a]}^{[b]}	February 3	Self-described "Eclectic Glamour," with a boisterous combination of color, textures, various knits. Many 1960s babydoll dresses.	
Donna Karan Collection^{[a]}	February 8		
Douglas Hannant^{[b]}	February 1	A feminine collection that was alternately slim-fitting and voluminous. A mix of fabrics, from tactile boucle to plain wool.	
Duckie Brown^{[a]}	February 1		
Elie Tahari^{[b]}	January 31	Chunky knitted sweaters cinched at the waist and paired with full pants. A mix of masculine and feminine looks.	
Erin Fetherston^{[a]}^{[b]}	February 1	Youthful, girly looks including drop-waist and bell-skirted dresses.	
Hervé Léger^{[a]} by Max Azria	February 3	The first half of the show featured Leger's classic bandage dresses with a definite Azria signature of beads, feathers, or similar adornments. The second half showcased more archetypal bandage minidresses in jewel tones.	
Iodice^{[a]}	February 4		
Jayson Brunsdon^{[a]}	February 7		
Jill Stuart^{[a]}	February 4		
Joanna Mastroianni^{[a]}	February 5		
Juan Carlos Obando^{[a]}	February 2		
Lacoste^{[a]}	February 2		
Lela Rose^{[a]}	February 3		
Malan Breton^{[a]}	February 6		
Mara Hoffman^{[a]}	February 2		
Matthew Williamson^{[a]}	February 5		
Max Azria^{[a]}	February 4		
Milly by Michelle Smith^{[a]}	February 6		
Miss Sixty^{[a]}	February 3		
Monique Lhuillier^{[a]}	February 5		
Na Be by Victorya Hong^{[a]}	February 1		
Naeem Khan^{[a]}	February 7		
Nanette Lepore^{[a]}	February 6		
Nautica^{[a]}	February 1		
Nicole Miller^{[a]}	February 1		
Pamella Rolan^{[a]}	February 4		
Perry Ellis^{[a]}	February 1		
Peter Som^{[a]}	February 4		
Ports 1961^{[a]}	February 4		
Project Runway^{[a]}	February 8		
R. Scott French^{[a]}	February 4		
Rachel Roy^{[b]}	January 31	Native American and Colonial influences, with a "mix of rawness and polish".	
Ralph Lauren^{[a]}	February 8		
Rebecca Taylor^{[a]}	February 7		
Reem Acra^{[a]}	February 7		
Richard Chai^{[a]}	February 6		
Rock & Republic^{[a]}	February 2		
Rubin Singer^{[a]}	February 1		
Sass & Bide^{[a]}	February 2		
Sean John^{[a]}	February 8		
Tadashi Shoji^{[a]}	February 8		
Temperley London^{[a]}	February 6		
Terexov^{[a]}	February 3		
Tibi^{[a]}	February 5		
Tommy Hilfiger^{[a]}	February 7		
Tony Cohen^{[a]}	February 7		
Tracy Reese^{[a]}	February 3		
Tuleh^{[a]}	February 3		
Twinkle by Wenlan^{[a]}	February 3		
Venexiana^{[a]}	February 1		
Vera Wang^{[a]}	February 7		
Vera Wang Lavender Label^{[b]}	January 31	Inaugural runway show for Wang's lower-priced collection. 1950s and 1960s influences, with classic or even retro clothing. More modern draped dresses drew from the style of Wang's signature collection.	
Verrier^{[a]}	February 2		
Vivienne Tam^{[a]}	February 5		
Willow^{[a]}	February 8		
Y-3^{[a]}	February 3		
Yeohlee^{[a]}	February 1		
Yigal Azrouel^{[a]}	February 1		
Z Zegna^{[a]}	February 2		
Zac Posen^{[a]}	February 7		
Zang Toi^{[a]}	February 8		
