= Spring 2008 New York Fashion Week =

Fashion event in New York City

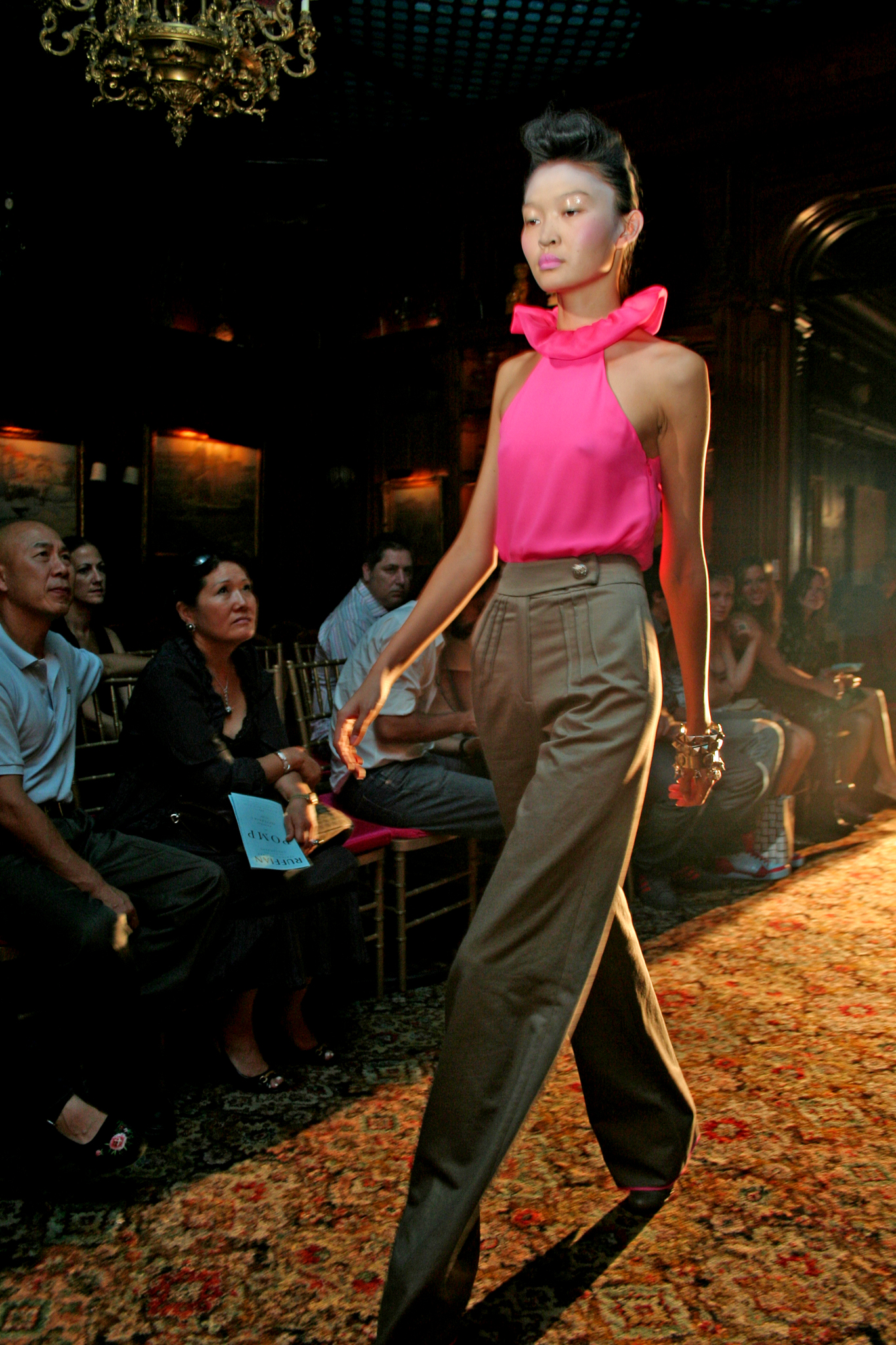
Eugenia Mandzhieva modeling for Ruffian during Spring 2008 New York Fashion Week

The Spring 2008 New York Fashion Week, officially called Mercedes-Benz Fashion Week, was held between September 5 and September 12, 2007.

== Fashion shows ==
Clothing line	Date	Notes	Link
3.1 Phillip Lim^{[b]}	September 8	Escapist styles, miniskirts, improvisational dressing, pleats and draping for evening	
Abaete^{[a]}^{[b]}	September 5	"Miami Deco meets Gene Tierney", color-block and shift dresses, maxi skirts, high-waisted pinup bikinis	
Academy of Art University^{[a]}	September 8	Has been presenting at Fashion Week biannually since 2005.	
ADAM^{[a]}^{[b]}	September 5	Laid-back pieces, beige and cream with interspersed color, Japanese influences, colored stripes, floor-length dresses, wide-leg pants	
Akiko Ogawa^{[a]}	September 6		
Alexander Wang^{[b]}	September 6	Reinterpretation of 1980s clothing, polished wool dresses, casual wardrobe staples	
Alexandre Herchcovitch^{[a]}^{[b]}	September 5	Tuxedo elements with punk details, dark colors with highlights of crimson and chartreuse, frothy cocktail dresses	
Anna Sui^{[a]}^{[b]}	September 10	Busby Berkeley musicals and Biba influences, bright-colored sequins, neons, metallic feathers, platform sandals, color-blocking, boleros, knee-length shirtwaist dresses with puff sleeves	
Anne Bowen^{[a]}	September 5		
Anne Klein^{[a]}^{[b]}	September 12	A mix of classic Americana and more artful dresses. Lacquered cotton, silver plisse, broomstick dresses, draped jersey dresses.	
Badgley Mischka^{[a]}^{[b]}	September 6	1920s-inspired eveningwear, 1970s-inspired sportswear including suits, jumpsuits, and maxi dresses.	
Barbara Tfank^{[b]}	September 8	Inspired by 1960s French actress Anouk Aimée. Luxurious fabrics, including brocades and jersey, in soigne shapes. Pale colors with occasional bright pink.	
BCBG Max Azria^{[a]}^{[b]}	September 5	Airy, feminine dresses made of organza, tulle, and jersey. Two silhouettes: one tailored and below the knee, the other sexier minidresses. Palette of pales and neutrals.	
Behnaz Sarafpour^{[b]}	September 7		
Benjamin Cho^{[b]}	September 8		
Betsey Johnson^{[a]}^{[b]}	September 11		
Bill Blass^{[a]}^{[b]}	September 6		
Brian Reyes^{[b]}	September 8		
Berardi^{[b]}	September 9		
Bruce^{[b]}	September 11		
Buckler^{[a]}	September 7		
Calvin Klein^{[a]}^{[b]}	September 11		
Carlos Miele^{[a]}^{[b]}	September 6		
Carmen Marc Valvo^{[a]}	September 11		
Carolina Herrera^{[a]}^{[b]}	September 10		
Chaiken^{[a]}^{[b]}	September 7		
Charles Nolan^{[b]}	September 6		
Chris Benz^{[b]}	September 10		
Costello Tagliapietra^{[b]}	September 7		
Custo Barcelona^{[a]}	September 11		
Cynthia Rowley^{[b]}	September 7		
Cynthia Steffe^{[a]}	September 6		
Daryl K^{[b]}	September 10		
Derek Lam^{[b]}	September 9		
Diane von Fürstenberg^{[a]}^{[b]}	September 9		
Diesel^{[a]}	September 8		
DKNY^{[a]}^{[b]}	September 9		
Donna Karan Collection^{[a]}^{[b]}	September 12		
Doo.Ri^{[b]}	September 7		
Douglas Hannant^{[b]}	September 6		
Duckie Brown^{[a]}	September 5		
Elie Tahari^{[b]}	September 5		
Erin Fetherston^{[a]}^{[b]}	September 5		
Gottex^{[a]}	September 6		
Heatherette^{[b]}	September 11		
Helmut Lang^{[b]}	September 10		
J. Mendel^{[a]}^{[b]}	September 7		
Jason Wu^{[b]}	September 5		
Jayson Brunsdon^{[a]}	September 11		
Jenni Kayne^{[b]}	September 6		
Jeremy Laing^{[b]}	September 6		
Jill Stuart^{[a]}^{[b]}	September 10		
Joanna Mastroianni^{[a]}	September 10		
Jovovich-Hawk^{[b]}	September 7		
Karen Walker^{[b]}	September 6		
Katy Rodriguez^{[b]}	September 10		
L.A.M.B^{[a]}^{[b]}	September 5		
L'Wren Scott^{[b]}	September 12		
Lacoste^{[a]}^{[b]}	September 8		
Lela Rose^{[a]}^{[b]}	September 6		
Luca Luca^{[a]}^{[b]}	September 10		
Lyn Devon^{[a]}	September 10		
Malandrino^{[b]}	September 8		
Malo^{[b]}	September 10		
Marc Bouwer^{[a]}	September 10		
Marc Jacobs^{[b]}	September 10		
Marc by Marc Jacobs^{[b]}	September 11		
Marchesa^{[b]}	September 5		
Miss Sixty^{[a]}	September 6		
McQ^{[b]}	September 8		
MaxAzria^{[a]}^{[b]}	September 7		
Michael Kors^{[a]}^{[b]}	September 9		
Monique Lhuillier^{[a]}^{[b]}	September 11		
Naeem Khan^{[a]}^{[b]}	September 11		
Nanette Lepore^{[a]}	September 10		
Naoki Takizawa^{[a]}^{[b]}	September 11		
Narciso Rodriguez^{[b]}	September 9		
Nary Manivong^{[a]}	September 6		
Nautica^{[a]}	September 5		
Nicholai^{[a]}	September 9		
Nicole Miller^{[a]}^{[b]}	September 5		
Noir^{[b]}	September 8		
Ohne Titel^{[b]}	September 8		
Pamella Roland^{[a]}	September 9		
Perry Ellis^{[a]}	September 5		
Peter Som^{[a]}^{[b]}	September 9		
Phi^{[b]}	September 8		
Philosophy^{[b]}	September 10		
Ports 1961^{[a]}	September 7		
Preen^{[b]}	September 6		
Proenza Schouler^{[b]}	September 7		
Rachel Comey^{[b]}	September 5		
Rachel Roy^{[b]}	September 5		
Rag & Bone^{[b]}	September 5		
Ralph Lauren^{[a]}^{[b]}	September 8		
Rebecca Taylor^{[a]}	September 8		
Reem Acra^{[a]}	September 9		
Reyes^{[b]}	September 9		
Richard Chai^{[a]}^{[b]}	September 9		
Rodarte^{[b]}	September 8		
Rosa Cha^{[a]}	September 8		
Ruffian^{[b]}	September 8		
Sue Stemp^{[b]}	September 5		
Toni Maticevski^{[a]}	September 5		
Trovata^{[b]}	September 5		
Stephen Burrows^{[b]}	September 6		
Terexov^{[a]}	September 6		
TSE^{[b]}	September 6		
Sabyasachi^{[a]}	September 7		
Sari Gueron^{[b]}	September 7		
Snoopy in Fashion^{[a]}	September 7		
Staerk^{[b]}	September 7		
Tadashi Shoji^{[a]}	September 12		
Temperley London^{[a]}^{[b]}	September 8		
Thakoon^{[b]}	September 7		
Threeasfour^{[b]}	September 8		
Tibi^{[a]}	September 11		
Tommy Hilfiger^{[a]}^{[b]}	September 12		
Tory Burch^{[b]}	September 11		
Tracy Reese^{[a]}^{[b]}	September 7		
Tuleh^{[a]}^{[b]}	September 9		
Twinkle by Wenlan^{[a]}	September 8		
United Bamboo^{[b]}	September 8		
Vena Cava^{[b]}	September 5		
Venexiana^{[a]}	September 5		
Vera Wang^{[a]}^{[b]}	September 7		
Vivienne Tam^{[b]}	September 10		
VPL^{[b]}	September 10		
Willow^{[a]}	September 9		
Y & Kei^{[b]}	September 5		
Y-3^{[a]}^{[b]}	September 8		
Yigal Azrouel^{[b]}	September 5		
Yeohlee^{[a]}	September 6		
Z Zegna^{[a]}	September 9		
Zac Posen^{[a]}^{[b]}	September 11		
Zero Maria Cornejo^{[b]}	September 7		

== Notes ==
a. Named on the official fashion week schedule

b. Reviewed at style.com
