= Parlour X =

- Industry: Retail
- Founded: 2001
- Founder: Eva Galambos
- Headquarters: Paddington, NSW, Australia
- Area served: Worldwide
- Website: https://www.parlourx.com

Parlour X is a luxury fashion boutique based in Sydney, Australia. It was founded by Eva Galambos in 2001, in the Sydney suburb of Paddington.

== History ==
Eva Galambos completed a fine-arts degree in art history and worked at the Museum of Contemporary Art Australia for two years, before moving to London.

Eva Galambos started her career in fashion working for Armani, where she received her training in fabrication, visual merchandising and operating systems. Later she was involved in the company’s launch of Arena magazine. Upon her return to Australia in 2001, she founded Parlour X. In 2016, Galambos was an ambassador for Sydney’s Museum of Contemporary Art.

Parlour X offers a selection from various designers including Céline, Chloè, Balenciaga, Saint Laurent, Stella McCartney, Loewe, Comme des Garcons and Isabel Marant, plus Australian designers like Ellery, Maticevski and Romance was Born.

In 2009, the boutique launched its e-commerce business. Shortly after the 1940's house of Galamos and Penny was finished in 2015, in May 2015, Parlour X announced its relocation from Fiveways Paddington into St John’s Baptist Church Paddington, as of August 2015.

== Awards ==
In April 2015, Parlour X won the 2015 Prix De Marie Claire, from the magazine Marie Claire, for "best Australian boutique". In 2016, it won the Australian Fashion Laureate for "best Australian retailer".

== Political views ==
Michael Penny, the business owner of Parlour X, joined in the "fight back" against the Oxford Street East cycleway. Penny was one of two business owners photographed in a campaign of 300 businesses.
