= Abaeté (disambiguation) =

Abaeté is a municipality in Minas Gerais, Brazil.

Abaeté may also refer to:

- Abaeté (clothing), a French-Brazilian fashion label
- Abaeté River, a river in Minas Gerais, Brazil
- Abaeté Futebol Clube, a football club in Abaetetuba, Pará, Brazil
- Abaeté Aviação or Aerotáxi Abaeté, a subregional airline in Salvador da Bahia, Brazil
- Abaeté Linhas Aéreas, a regional airline in Lauro de Freitas, Brazil
