= Burfitt =

Burfitt is a surname. Notable people with the surname include:

- Brooke Burfitt (born 1988), British actress and radio presenter
- Nicholas Burfitt (born 1966), British rower

== See also ==
- Burditt
- Burkitt
