= Martin Grant =

Australian fashion designer

- Born: 1966; Melbourne
- Education: Victorian College of the Arts
- Occupation: Fashion designer
- Website: martingrantparis.com

Martin Grant is a Paris-based, Australian fashion designer. He has created outfits for Naomi Campbell, Cate Blanchett, Emma Stone, Tilda Swinton and Lady Gaga. The National Gallery of Victoria has held exhibitions of his work in 2004 and 2025.

== Early life ==
Born in Melbourne, Australia, Grant was one of six siblings and became interested in fashion at a very early age with his kindergarten drawings featuring dresses. He was taught to sew by his seamstress grandmother. He attended Nunawading High School until the age of 15 when he left to pursue fashion and joined the evening wear designer Desbina Collins. In 1982 Grant launched is first ready-to-wear line. He built a reputation through the Fashion Design Council, which staged runway shows of emerging and avant-garde designers. In 1988 he received the Cointreau Young Designer award.

Despite his rapid rise in fashion at the age of 21 Grant enrolled in sculpture at the Victorian College of the Arts but cut his studies short after two years to relocate to Paris to once again pursue fashion.

== Move to Paris ==
Grant decided to leave Australia in 1990 and lived for a time in London before settling in Paris. Grant worked in Paris making garments; at first with Australian artist Liz Sterling, and later under his own name. In 1996 he opened a boutique in the Rue des Rosiers. It was here that Grant's big breakthrough came when Naomi Campbell modelled at his boutique.

In 2013 Martin designed the uniforms for the Australian Qantas airline. The National Gallery of Victoria exhibited Grant's work in 2004 and again in a major retrospective in 2025 after Grant donated more than 200 designs from his archive to the gallery.
