= Jazmin Whitley =

American fashion designer

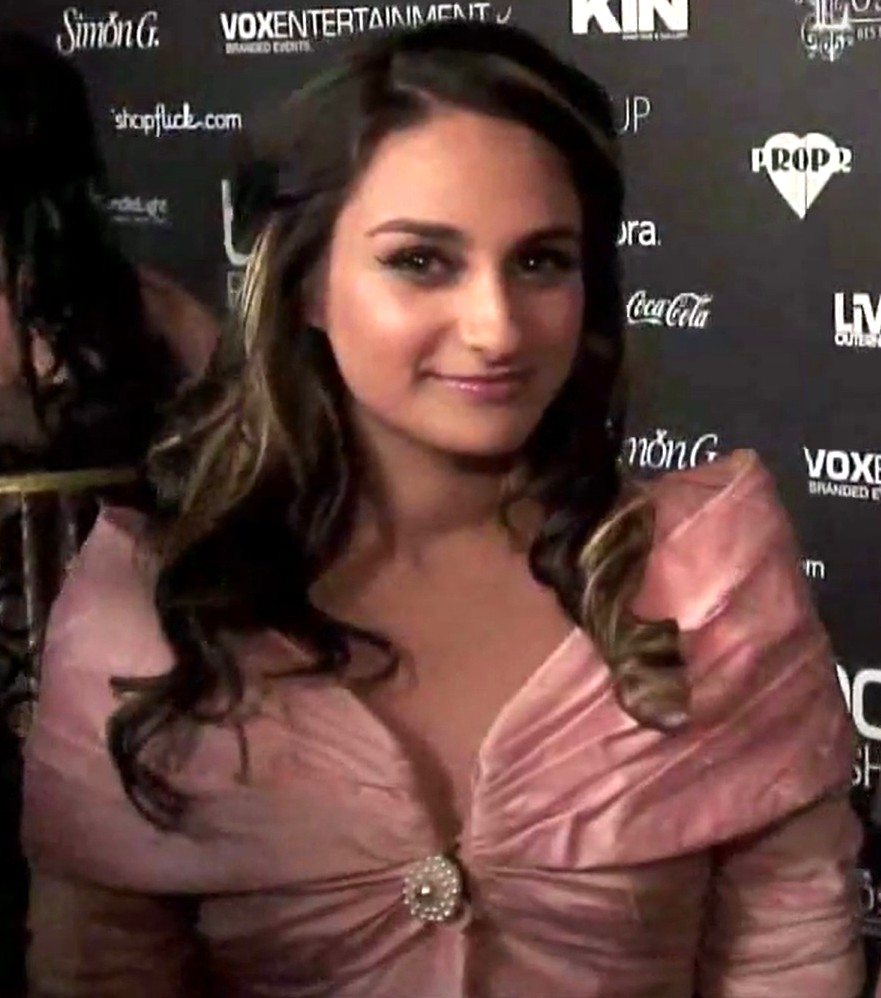
Whitley in 2009

Jazmin Whitley is an American fashion designer.

== Fashion line ==
On March 31, 2006, Whitley launched her clothing label during Los Angeles Fashion Week, at the age of 17, making her the youngest fashion designer to do so. She continued to make fashion history by being the youngest fashion designer to show during New York Fashion Week at the age of 18, on Sept 10, 2007. Her clients include Christina Ricci, Aimee Teegarden, Kali Hawk, Jaime Pressly, Christian Serratos, Blu Cantrell, Michelle Stafford, Christa B. Allen, Rena Riffel, Courtney Halverson, Paris Hilton, and Victoria Justice among others wearing her designs on the red carpet.

Whitley was contacted by MTV and asked to do a series that gives a view into the life of a young fashion designer and a glimpse into the backstage madness of the fashion industry. She began shooting in 2008. She can currently be seen on MTV's House of Jazmin.

Jazmin Whitley has been featured in W Magazine, Teen Vogue, Seventeen, Us Weekly, American Superstar Magazine, Portrait Magazine, San Diego Life & Fashion Magazine, Global Women Magazine, Relate Magazine, Westlake Magazine, Imperfekshun Magazine, LA Direct Magazine, 944 Magazine, Justine Magazine, Gawk Magazine, Angelino Magazine, Apparel News, as well as on the cover of Santa Monica Sun Magazine and numerous others.
