= Kellwood Company =

American apparel manufacturer

Kellwood Company, LLC
- Type: Private
- Industry: Apparel
- Founded: 1961
- Headquarters: City of Industry, California
- Key people: David Falwell, CEO; Caren Belair Group President, Lifestyle & Juniors; Adrian Kowalewski, CFO; Henry Paradela, CIO; XiaoPei Chin, President of Production and Sourcing; Mary Yap, Director Human Resources.
- Products: Apparel
- Website: Kellwood.com

Kellwood Company is an American apparel manufacturer. Founded in 1961, Kellwood's portfolio of Women's, Juniors, and Girls' apparel includes Parker, Devlin, Briggs NY, Democracy, Jax, Rewind, My Michelle, and licensed brands. Kellwood became an affiliated company of Sun Capital Partners, Inc. in February 2008. In December 2016, Kellwood Company was acquired by an unnamed Hong Kong investor group for an undisclosed amount.

== History ==
=== Formation in 1961 ===
In 1961, fifteen independent suppliers of soft goods to Sears, Roebuck and Co were merged to form Kellwood Company. Taking its name from two former Sears' executives, Charles H. Kellstadt and Robert E. Wood, The first officers included Maurice Perlstein, president and treasurer; Fred W. Wenzel, vice president; Stanley M. Guthunz, vice president; Ovide de St. Aubin, Jr., vice president; and Howard Michaelson, Jr., secretary. The 15 original companies were Ahoskie Manufacturing Co., Albert of Arizona, Biltmore Manufacturing Co., Calhoun Garment Co., Garver Manufacturing Co., Greenfield Manufacturing Co., Hawthorn Company, McComb Manufacturing Co., Monticello Manufacturing Co., Ottenheimer Bros. Manufacturing Co., Oxford Manufacturing Co., Rutherford Garment Co., Siler City Manufacturing Co., Southern Foundations, and Spencer Manufacturing Co.

=== Growth ===
The company experienced its greatest success under the leadership of William John McKenna, who w as COO and later CEO from 1982 to 1996. For Kellwood Company, McKenna acquired Smart Shirts, Cape Cod-Cricket Lane, American Recreation Products Ltd., Crowntuft Manufacturing Corporation, Slumberjack Inc., D Corporation Inc., California Ivy, Inc., A.J. Brandon, Inc., Parsons Place Apparel (now Sag Harbor), E Z Sportswear (now Melrose), En Chant'e Inc. (now ENC), Goodman Knitting Company, Inc., Dotti and Sierra Designs, and launched a Kathie Lee Gifford clothing label. Also under McKenna's term, Kellwood's sales surpassed $1 billion.

In 1965, Bob Swanson and George Rudolph left Trailwise/Ski Hut in Berkeley, California and founded Sierra Designs at 137 Tewksbury in Point Richmond. In 1968, Sierra Designs introduced the 60/40 Parka from a fabric with a blend of cotton (58%, warp) and nylon (42%, weft).

In 2005, chairman Hal Upbin stepped down as the company's CEO, passing the title on to Kellwood's president, Robert Skinner. After he retired as a CEO, Upbin became Kellwood's adviser in specific areas such as mergers and acquisitions, strategic planning, and operational projects.

In 2008, Gerber Childrenswear, a division of Kellwood Company, entered into a licensing agreement with Jockey International.

In 2012, Jill Granoff was appointed as Kellwood Company's CEO.

=== Acquisitions ===
In February 2008, Kellwood Company became an affiliated company of Sun Capital Partners, Inc. In January 2010, Kellwood Company acquired ISIS, an award-winning outdoor company focused on women's performance and casual apparel. In January 2011, Kellwood Company acquired Rebecca Taylor, a contemporary sportswear brand created by New Zealand-born fashion designer Rebecca Taylor and her business partner Elizabeth Bugdaycay. In July 2011, Kellwood announced its acquisition of Zobha, a high-performance yoga and fitness apparel and accessories company.

On November 22, 2013, Kellwood and Sun Capital Partners completed the initial public offering of Vince under the ticker VNCE on the NYSE. In July 2014, Kellwood Holding, LLC announced its acquisition of Parker. Clothier Vince announced in late April 2017 that it might not remain in business over the next year after a severe decline in revenues and stock value. In October 2023, CreditRiskMonitor reported that Vince Holding was nearing a potential Chapter 11 bankruptcy filing.

In 2016, Kellwood was acquired by a Hong Kong–based investor group. Following the acquisition, David Falwell was promoted from Executive Vice President to the company's CEO.

== See also ==
- List of outdoor industry parent companies
- List of mountaineering equipment brands
