= Isabel Marant =

French fashion designer (born 1967)

- Born: 12 April 1967 (age 59); Boulogne-Billancourt, France
- Occupation: Fashion designer
- Known for: Footwear; Clothing; Jewellery; Accessories
- Website: www.isabelmarant.com

Isabel Marant (born 12 April 1967) is a French fashion designer, owner of the eponymous fashion brand. She won the Award de la Mode (1997), the Whirlpool Award for best female designer (1998), Fashion Designer of the Year at British Glamour's Women of the Year Awards (2012). She was named Contemporary Designer of the Year at the Elle Style Awards in 2014. Her collaboration with H&M in 2013 was so successful that company's website crashed under the demand and the collection was sold out within 45 minutes. Celebrities wearing Marant's designs include Alexa Chung, Katie Holmes, Victoria Beckham, Kate Moss, Sienna Miller, Kate Bosworth and Rachel Weisz.

== Biography ==
=== Early life and education ===
Isabel Marant was born on 12 April 1967 in Boulogne-Billancourt to a French father and German mother, Christa Fielder who worked as a model and later model agent. Her parents divorced when Marant was six and she lived with her father who had remarried. In childhood, Marant didn't want to be a designer, she dreamt of becoming a veterinarian when she grew up. She was raised in the Hauts-de-Seine suburb Neuilly-sur-Seine, refusing to wear dresses and carrying alternative outfits to school in plastic bags. At the age of 14, Marant had a haircut like Patti Smith's and wore customised menswear. In 1982, she asked her father to buy her a sewing machine and she started making clothes out of discarded clothing and fabric, and very soon, her friends asked her to design clothing for them. At 15, Marant was crazy about Vivienne Westwood and she did babysitting to be able to buy something at Westwood's Paris shop.

She pursued her studies at the Saint-James high school in Neuilly, then at HEC, before quickly changing direction following the success of the brand "Aller Simple," which she co-founded in 1984 with her friend Christophe Lemaire, a young student (later artistic director of Lacoste and Hermès). They dropped it off to a Le Depot shop in Paris that paid when clothes were sold. The clothing sold well enough to make her reconsider her plans to study economics. From 1985 to 1987, Marant studied fashion at Studio Berçot, a Paris fashion college.

=== Early career ===
In 1987, after her studies, Marant worked with Parisian designer Michel Klein. Later she also collaborated with Bridget Yorke working on two collections and assisted art director Marc Ascoli on different projects for Chloé, Martine Sitbon, and Yohji Yamamoto. However, working in other houses was a frustrating experience for her, and soon Marant decided to continue alone. In 1989, she launched a collection of belts and rings, followed by a line of belts for Claude Montana, a line of buttons and necklaces for Étienne Brunel, and a line of shoe buckles for Michel Perry.

In 1990 with her mother, she launched a knitwear and jersey label "Twen".

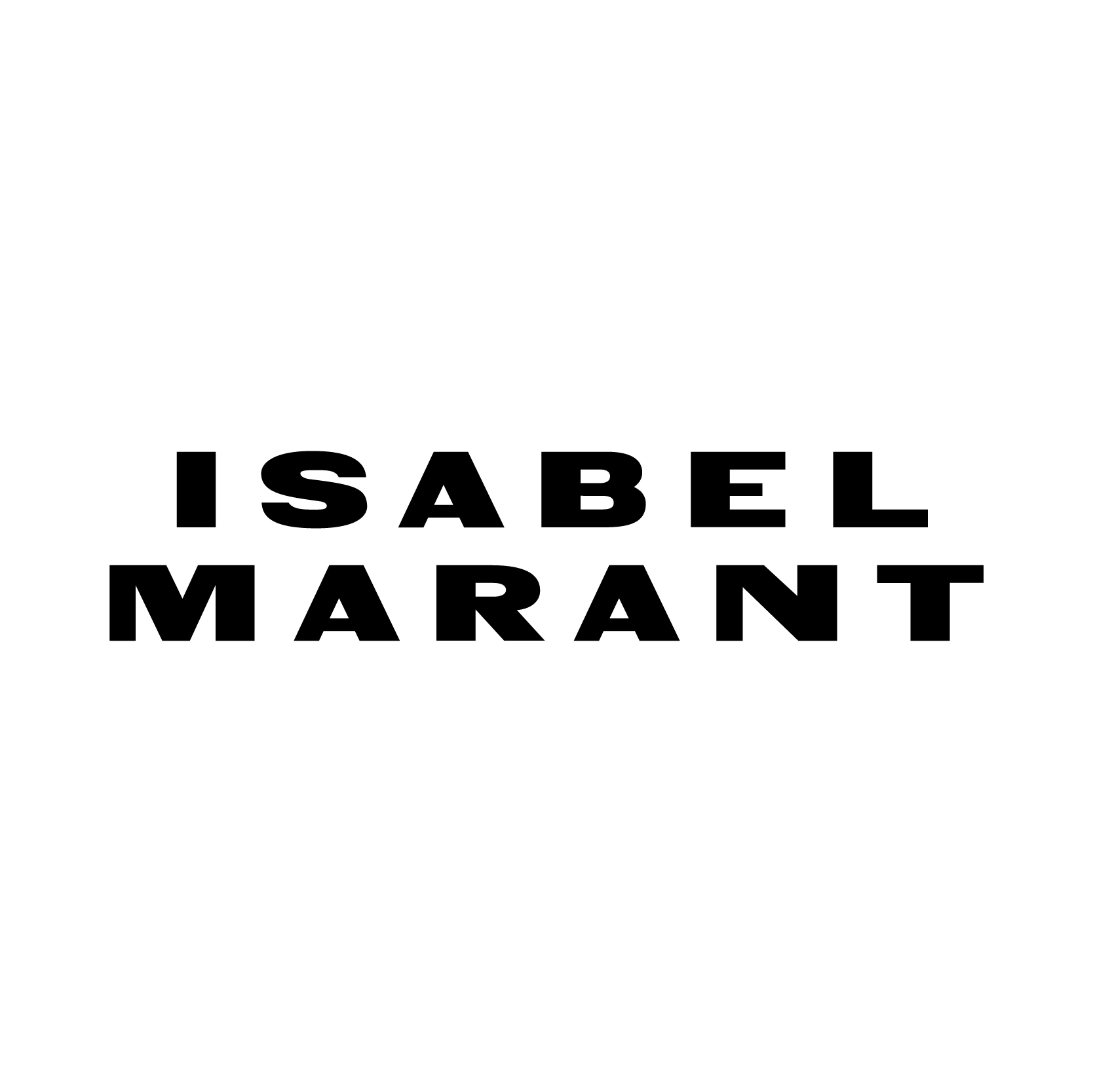
Brand's logo

== Isabel Marant™ ==
In 1994, Marant launched her eponymous brand – Isabel Marant. The following year, in 1995, she showed her first collection at Paris Fashion Week with her friends as models. In 1997 Marant won the Award de la Mode, and in 1998 – the Whirlpool Award for best female designer. Since the establishment of her label, her sales have increased 30% each year.

In 1998, Marant opened the first shop on Rue Charonne, in eastern Paris. The same year she started collaborating with French mail catalogue brand La Redoute creating guest collections for it, and launched a new line in Japan called I*M. In 1999 Marant debuted a diffusion line, Étoile by Isabel Marant, at the Paris ready-to-wear shows, and the next year introduced the first full Étoile collection. Etoile was intended to be more affordable and casual than the signature brand. The second shop was opened in Saint-Germain-des-Prés in 1999, followed by the third in the Marais in 2007, and the fourth in the 16th arrondissement in 2012.

In 2004, Marant launched a childrenswear line and a pop-up boutique in Paris' Printemps department store. She also collaborated with Anthropologie on a collection in 2006. The same year, in 2006, she opened a boutique in Hong Kong, and in 2010 opened her first United States boutique in New York. Marant's managing director reported wholesale revenues reached 66 million Euros for 2011, which was up 44% on 2010.

In 2013, Marant collaborated on a design collection for high street chain H&M. The line sold out in 45 minutes online and caused the retailer's website to crash. In her collaboration with H&M, Marant said, "The nice thing with H&M is they don't want to try to do a cheap version of your own collection… They really respect the DNA of designers." The clothing was described as a "combination of androgynous chic and bohemian nonchalance."

In 2020, the label signed a 10-year licensing agreement with Safilo for the design, production and global distribution of sunglasses and optical frames.

In 2021, the brand launched Isabel Marant Vintage, a secondhand site that takes donations of used clothing from the label in exchange for vouchers.

As of 2019, the company has 13 shops worldwide in cities such as Paris, Rome, New York, Tokyo, Hong Kong, Seoul, Los Angeles, Beijing, Madrid, Beirut, and London and has retailers in more than 35 countries. Isabel Marant has announced the closure of its Tokyo Omotesando and Newman Shinjuku stores.

=== Style ===
When Marant studied fashion at Studio Berçot, the director said “You shouldn't want others to wear things that you won't wear yourself”, and this phrase became her motto. Marant collections are based around several simple pieces such as tight and straight trousers; soft and unstructured shirts and blouses; as well as tailored jackets and coats. Her apparel is often embellished with prints, fringes, embroidery, studs or lace. Marant's typical outfit allows the wearer to be between boho and rock chic with a loose blouse and a pair of cropped leather trousers. The collections never change radically which makes it easy to combine pieces from different seasons.

Marant designed hidden heel high-top sneakers that lengthen legs and make feet look tiny remaining comfortable at the same time. They became the brand's most pervasive trend with a million copies sold.

== Recognition ==
In 2012, Marant was awarded Fashion Designer of the Year at British Glamour Women of the Year Awards.

In 2014, Marant was named Contemporary Designer of the Year at the Elle Style Awards in 2014.

== Filmography ==
- Loïc Prigent, The Day before Isabel Marant, documentary, Arte, 2010, 52 min.
- Dominique Miceli, Isabel Marant : naissance d'une collection, documentary, Paris Première, 2019, 52 min.

== Controversies ==
In 2008, Marant won a claim against French fashion chain Naf Naf that was ordered to pay her 75,000 Euros damages for copying a puff-sleeved dress from her autumn-winter 2006 collection.

In 2015, the indigenous Mixe community of Santa María Tlahuitoltepec, in Oaxaca, Mexico, denounced Marant for the plagiarism of the collectively owned traditional design embroidered in their Mixe blouses. A Twitter storm followed under the hashtag #miBlusadeTlahui, which pointed out the uncanny similarity of some of Marant's recent designs to those of indigenous designers from Tlahuitoltepec, who have been designing and making their original hand-sewn shirts for over 600 years in the style of the Mixe indigenous people. Marant's uncredited appropriation of the designs, virtually stitch-for-stitch, aroused the anger of the Mixe people for whom the handmade manufacture of the shirts, and their sale, is an important economic and cultural factor.

The plagiarism issue continued to dog Marant, being taken up by the UK Guardian newspaper in June 2015 by journalist Naomi Larsson, who reported that yet another design company named Antik Batik had claimed copyright on the disputed garment, and quoted Marant's office as admitting the design was from Tlahuitoltepec as a defence against the claim. The Mixe people had received no communication of this acknowledgement, according to the report. In 2016, the community again demanded an apology from Marant and Antik Batik at a press conference in Mexico City.

== Personal life ==
Marant is married to designer Jérôme Dreyfuss. Their son, Tal, was born in 2003. The family lives in Belleville, Paris. They spend most of their weekends in a countryside cabin with no electricity or hot water in Fontainebleau, 50 km away from Paris.
