= Samora =

Samora is a unisex given name and a surname. People with the name include:

== Given name ==
- Samora Fihlani (born 1985), South African rugby union player
- Samora Goodson (born 1984), American football player
- Samora Khulu (died 2008), South African football player
- Samora Machel (1933–1986), Mozambican military commander and political leader
- Samora Smallwood, Canadian actress and writer
- Samora Yunis (born 1949), Ethiopian military officer

== Surname ==
- Julian Samora (1920–1996), American scholar
- Rogério Samora (1958–2021), Portuguese actor
