= Burditt =

Burditt is a surname. Notable people with the surname include:

- Albert Burditt (born 1972), American basketball player
- George Burditt (lawyer) (1922–2013), American lawyer and politician
- George Burditt (writer) (1923–2013), American screenwriter
- Jack Burditt, American screenwriter and son of George Burditt
- Ken Burditt (1906–1977), English footballer
- Whitney Kroenke Burditt (born 1977), American film producer and philanthropist
