= Michel Klein (designer) =

French fashion designer (born 1958)

Michel Klein (born 1958) is a French fashion designer.

In 2005, Itokin was the Michel Klein ready-to-wear license holder in Japan with retail value of €70 million.
