= Pamella Roland =

American fashion designer

Pamella DeVos
- Born: Pamella Roland
- Education: Michigan State University
- Occupation: Fashion designer
- Label: Pamella roland
- Spouse: Dan DeVos
- Website: www.pamellaroland.com

Pamella Roland is an American fashion designer. She is the founder of the Pamella Roland, an evening wear line. She was named a Kennedy Center trustee in January 2025.

== Education ==
After graduating from Michigan State University with a degree in business, Roland built an extensive professional background in marketing and public relations, working for nearly ten years in both corporate and agency environments.

== Career ==
Roland debuted her first collection at New York Fashion Week in fall of 2002. Pamella Roland has since become a label of choice among Hollywood’s elite, including Angelina Jolie, Jennifer Garner, Halle Berry, Eva Longoria, and Kim Cattrall. In 2003, Roland received a Gold Coast Award. In 2010, Roland was inducted into the Council of Fashion Designers of America (CFDA).
