= Carmen Marc Valvo =

American fashion designer

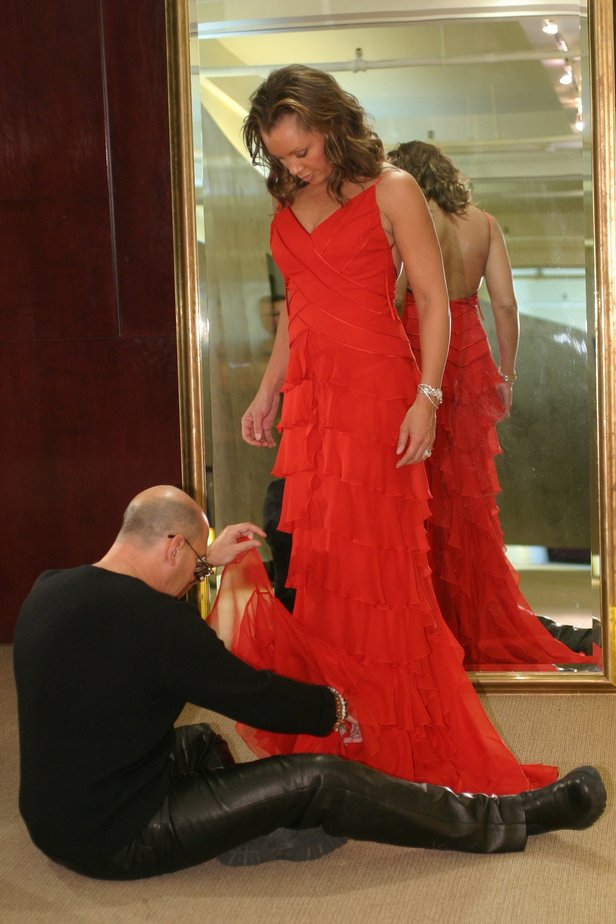
- Carmen Marc Valvo fitting Vanessa Williams
- Born: July 3, 1953 (age 73)
- Education: Manhattanville College
- Occupation: Designer

Carmen Marc Valvo (born July 3, 1953) is an American fashion designer who specializes in evening wear and high-end cocktail dresses for a line of the same name, founded in 1989. He also has an eyewear collection, a lingerie collection, a swimsuit line which is a best-seller at Victoria's Secret, and a Hamptons-inspired home collection, called CMV Home sold through QVC. He most recently launched a collection of evening bags and an exclusive Bridal Collection, in 2010. Valvo is best known for his tailored fit and form-fitting dresses.

== Biography ==
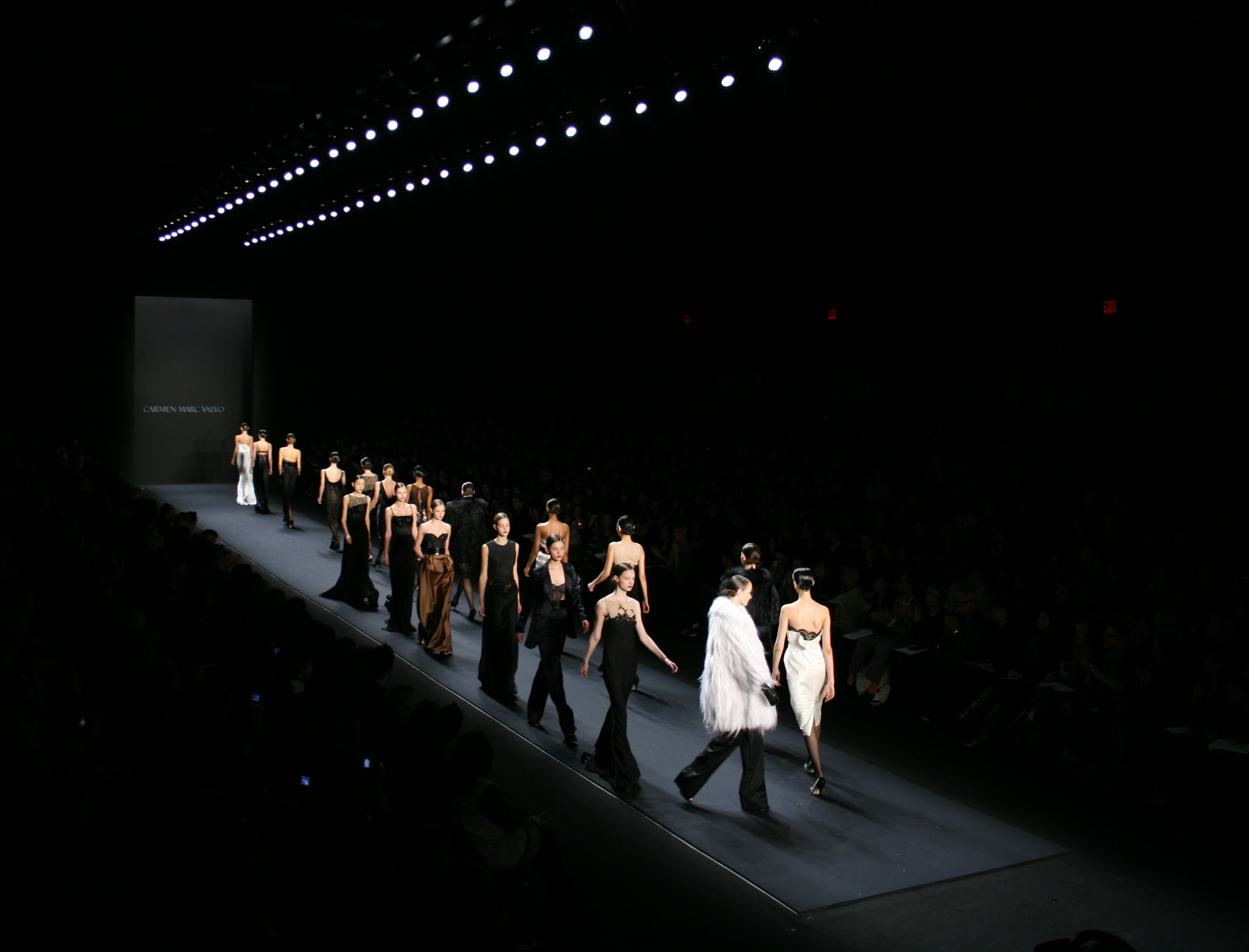
(Carmen Marc Valvo's fashion show in the Tent, Bryant Park, February 8, 2008)

"Valvo grew up in a traditional Spanish/Italian family in Westchester County, New York where early on he developed a passion for oil painting and made costumes for his sisters' school projects," though his passion for the arts did not materialize into a career until later on. He once admitted he didn't realize that being a designer "was a real profession." His father was an anesthesiologist and his mother a nurse, and Valvo envisioned a career as a plastic surgeon, volunteering his free time in the ER. Eventually, he turned to a degree in Fine Arts at Manhattanville College. He then spent a few years traveling in Europe, enriching himself in the endless culture and becoming proficient in several languages. He returned to the US and enrolled in the Parsons The New School for Design. Valvo began his professional career as ready-to-wear designer for Nina Ricci in Paris, and later spent time at Christian Dior. In 1989 he launched his own label, putting together a collection to show at the fall market in New York with only a few thousand dollars. His sportswear was a success among department stores, but his evening wear sparked interest in buyers at Saks Fifth Avenue and Neiman Marcus, two stores he regularly sells at today. In response to demand from celebrity and VIP clientele, Valvo launched his Couture collection in 1998. This line has shown every year, twice a year, at New York Fashion Week in the tents at Bryant Park, since its inception, with the notable exception of Fall 2009's collection.

=== Valvo's withdrawal from the Tents at Bryant Park ===
Sometime in December 2008, rumors emerged that the then recent economic news would affect the upcoming New York Fashion Week in February, showing Fall 2009. Valvo, as well as Betsey Johnson and Vera Wang, were among the first and most notable designers to withdraw from showing a formal fashion show at Bryant Park, which costs upwards of $100,000, and opt for a more intimate, casual, and certainly less costly, presentation. The tent runway shows usually have an audience of 1,000 people, but even in the Spring 2009 show in September, VP of Communications Frank Pulice said there was about a 25% decrease in attendance. Pulice explains the decision: "We didn't know if we would have the audience we felt we needed to justify the cost of putting on that show – stores are cutting back on sending buyers to the shows, there's less and less press coming." Valvo held his Fall 2009 Collection presentation at the Citrine club, where a total of about 200 buyers, press and other attendees were able drop in and out at their leisure, while models mingled, adorned in the new couture collection, and a mock-runway video played in the background. Following the presentation hour, there was a cocktail reception, where attendees interacted and admired the clothing of Valvo. It is estimated that this type of event cost close to half of a show at the tents.

== Press and recognition ==
Valvo's designs have been used by certain women such as HRH Princess Madeleine of Sweden, Queen Latifah, Beyoncé Knowles, Katie Couric, Leona Lewis, Catherine Zeta-Jones, Vanessa Williams, Kate Winslet, Eva Longoria, and Mary J. Blige, etc. His designs were also featured in Confessions of a Shopaholic movie. His designs are regularly stocked at Lord & Taylor, Neiman Marcus, Saks Fifth Avenue, Bloomingdale's, Nordstrom, Bergdorf Goodman, and other specialty stores nationally and internationally.

== Philanthropy ==
Valvo is involved with many charitable organizations but has given most of his time to promoting awareness and encouraging the discussion of colorectal cancer (he is a board member at the Colorectal Cancer Alliance), as he is a survivor himself. Carmen is an Entertainment Industry Foundation (EIF) Ambassador and has given both his time and money to the organization, which has helped raise millions of dollars for colorectal cancer research. One of Carmen's favorite organizations to which he has shown generosity is the National Colorectal Cancer Research Alliance (NCCRA). Valvo has partnered with Katie Couric since their meeting at 7th on Sixth (New York Fashion Week, now called Mercedes-Benz Fashion Week) in 2004 to bring attention to, and support research for, the deadly disease. His efforts on behalf of the organization were honored at a gala in March 2006 in New York where Carmen received the first ever Advocate Award from Couric. Valvo and his long-time friend Vanessa Williams also recently appeared in a national print and broadcast campaign to bring awareness to the importance of early screening.

=== Friends in Deed: Valvo and Katie Couric ===
For the Spring/Summer 2005 fashion week in New York City, Valvo joined the "Be Seen, Be Screened" campaign with Katie Couric, the National Colorectal Cancer Research Alliance (NCCRA), the Entertainment Industry Foundation, Olympus, New York Mayor Michael Bloomberg, Anna Wintour, Fern Mallis, Iman, Nia Vardalos and Patrick McMullan. At Bryant Park, Valvo revealed his personal struggle with colorectal cancer and joined the NCCRA as an ambassador in its initiative to raise awareness of this curable, but deadly, form of cancer.

=== Vanessa Williams and Carmen Marc Valvo's Colorectal Cancer PSA in March 2008 ===
In March 2008, longtime friends Award-winning singer and actress Vanessa Williams and Valvo appeared in a public service campaign about the importance of early screening for colorectal cancer, which highlighted that colorectal cancer is a preventable and curable cancer through screening. The campaign included both print and broadcast (video) announcements. The printed material appeared in fashion and lifestyle magazines while the videos were aired in March during National Colorectal Cancer Awareness Month.

=== Valvo Partners with the Colorectal Cancer Alliance ===
Carmen partnered with the Colorectal Cancer Alliance in 2011 to promote Dress in Blue Day, a colorectal cancer awareness day held the first Friday of every March, which is National Colorectal Cancer Awareness Month. He donated a blue gown from his Black Label for the Colorectal Cancer Alliance to auction off, and designed a limited edition women's T-shirt for the event.

=== Personal struggle with colorectal cancer ===
"Unbeknownst to me, two close relatives had already struggled with this condition – but we simply never talked about that kind of thing in our family. So when I began to question relatives, and it came out that I was not the first, not even the second – I had to wonder why we never talked about it."

Valvo said of the "Be Seen, Be Screened" event, it "was a wonderful way to begin a dialogue that is very important to me. Before I was diagnosed with colorectal cancer I was totally unaware of my own family history relating to the disease. With no family history on record, I was not eligible for prescreening by insurance and would have normally had to wait until the age of 50 for my first colorectal cancer screening. Had I waited my prognoses would have been much, much different."

=== The Red Dress Collection ===
The Red Dress Collection has shown at New York Fashion Week yearly since its inception in 2003 by the National Heart, Lung, and Blood Institute. Each of the 25 red dresses is designed by a different designer and worn by a different celebrated and glamorous woman—from Former First Lady Laura Bush to Christie Brinkley—and helps to promote their national campaign The Heart Truth, established in 2001. The campaign was created to increase women's awareness of heart disease. The symbolic red dress—the color of strength and vitality—has become the national emblem of the campaign. Heart disease is the number one killer of women in America.
