= Costello Tagliapietra =

U.S. fashion house

- Company type: Private
- Industry: Fashion
- Founded: 2005
- Founders: Jeffrey Costello; Robert Tagliapietra
- Headquarters: New York City, United States
- Area served: United States, Belgium, France, Germany, Lebanon, Russia, Saudi Arabia, Turkey
- Key people: Jeffrey Costello (Designer); Robert Tagliapietra (Designer)
- Products: Women's prêt-à-porter clothing

Costello Tagliapietra is a fashion house, established in New York City, founded and directed by Jeffrey Costello (born in Bristol, Pennsylvania) and Robert Tagliapietra (born in Pleasantville, New York).

== History ==
Costello and Tagliapietra met in Manhattan in 1994, and after eleven years working together they presented their first collection for the spring 2005 season at New York Fashion Week, and won the 2005 Ecco Domani Fashion Foundation Award. The brand were nominated back-to-back for the CFDA/Vogue Fashion Fund in 2005 and 2006.

From its inception, Costello Tagliapietra has had a prêt-à-porter clothing line for women. The brand has done collaborations and stagewear for artists such as Madonna, Björk, and Bruce Springsteen. The designers have been featured in exhibitions at institutions such as The Metropolitan Museum of Art and the Victoria and Albert Museum.

== Designers ==
- Jeffrey Costello
- Robert Tagliapietra

== Retail outlets ==
The brand has stores in USA, Belgium, France, Germany, Lebanon, Russia, Saudi Arabia and Turkey.
