= Ángel Sánchez (fashion designer) =

Venezuelan fashion designer (born 1960)

- Born: 7 October 1960 (age 65)
- Known for: fashion design

Ángel Sánchez (born October 7, 1960) is a Venezuelan fashion designer. He specializes in evening wear and bridal designs. He was inspired to enter fashion by his mother, who was an atelier, and combined that with his knowledge of architecture, which he practiced for many years and refers to as his "first love". Sánchez's designs reflect his architectural discipline and structure while creating new shapes and proportions that hold true to the timeless perfection of traditional couture. His designs are architectural, contemporary, and feminine; which always include a touch of drama.
