= Charles Nolan =

American fashion designer

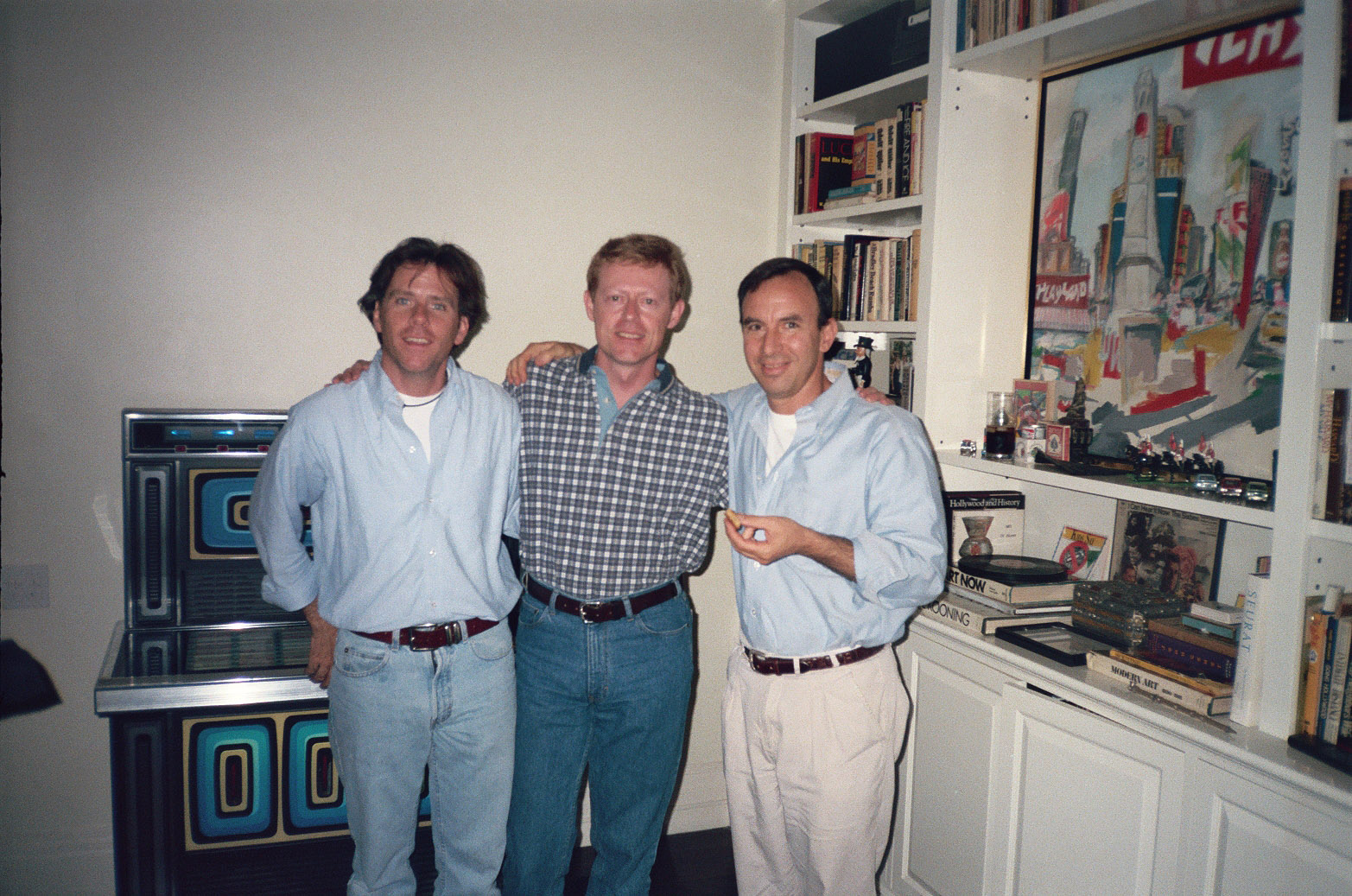
Nolan with Alan Light and Andrew Tobias

Charles Nolan (June 5, 1957 – January 30, 2011) was an American fashion designer. He was the fifth in a family of nine children and was raised in the New York City borough of Brooklyn and the New York City suburb of Massapequa, Long Island.

Nolan graduated from the Fashion Institute of Technology and then went on to work for the designers Frank Tignino and Bill Haire. Subsequent to those assignments he designed licensed products for Bill Blass and Christian Dior, before assuming leading roles at Ellen Tracy and Anne Klein.

Nolan was the lead designer at Anne Klein from 2001 until 2003, when he resigned to volunteer for the Howard Dean 2004 presidential campaign. When the campaign ended, he launched his own signature line in 2004. The line was available only at his own store on Gansevoort Street in the New York City borough of Manhattan and through an exclusive deal at Saks Fifth Avenue.

Nolan died of cancer of the head and neck, in New York City, New York, on January 30, 2011, at the age of 53. He was the partner of the financial writer and Democratic National Committee treasurer, Andrew Tobias.
