= Wenlan Chia =

American fashion designer

Wenlan Chia (賈雯蘭) is a Taiwanese- American fashion designer born in Taipei who is creator of the line, Twinkle by Wenlan, which she launched in 2000. Twinkle made its Fashion Week debut in 2003. The collection is known for its whimsical take on feminine dressing with a dash of the exotic, a dose of pop culture and a sense of humor. In addition to women's ready-to-wear, her line includes home decor and accessories, called Twinkle Living, which launched in 2006; costume and fine jewelry (Twinkle Accessories); knitting yarns; and leather accessories (Twinkle Handknit Yarns).

Chia has also written three knitting pattern books: Twinkle's Big City Knits, Twinkle's Weekend Knits and Twinkle's Town and Country Knits. Twinkle knit designs are characterized by the use of traditional knitting patterns knit with oversized needles and large gauge yarns. Chia's knitwear designs are sometimes featured in Interweave Knits magazine, and a line of her Twinkle yarns was being distributed by Classic Elite Yarns until the Fall of 2012.

To complement her books, Chia began to offer knitting lessons in Rockefeller Center's Anthropologie store. In 2009, she published a sewing pattern book, Twinkle Sews.

Wenlan Chia's awards and nominations include the Onward Kashiyama New Design Prize in Tokyo, the Competition of Young Fashion Designers in Paris, and a nomination for the Fashion Group International Rising Star Award. In 2005, she was selected as one of "Spring’s Leading Ladies" by Vogue magazine.
