= Adam Lippes =

American fashion designer (born 1972)

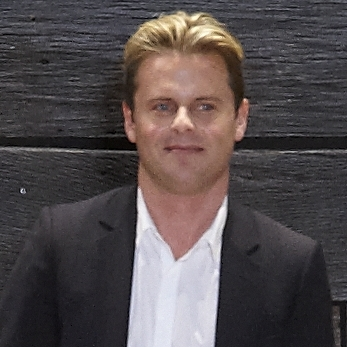
- Lippes in 2010
- Born: December 24, 1972 (age 53); Buffalo, New York
- Education: Nichols School
- Alma mater: Cornell University; American University of Paris
- Occupation: Fashion designer
- Employer: Creative director of Oscar de la Renta
- Parent(s): Gerald S. Lippes; Sandra Franger Lippes
- Website: www.adamlippes.com

Adam Lippes (born December 24, 1972) is an American fashion designer who came to prominence at Oscar de la Renta and has had his own company since 2004.

== Early life and education ==
Lippes was born in Buffalo, New York, one of three children of Gerald S. Lippes, a lawyer, and Sandra Lippes (née Franger, d. 2004), a nurse. After the Nichols School in Buffalo he studied Psychology at Cornell University, graduating in 1994, and art history and architecture at the American University of Paris.

== Early career ==
Lippes began his fashion career at Polo Ralph Lauren in 1995, before moving to Oscar de la Renta, where he was quickly promoted to Global Creative Director. From 1996 to 2003, he worked closely with de la Renta throughout the company, including design, marketing and new business development.

=== Own Label ===
In 2004, Lippes launched his own collection of cotton basics under the label ADAM + EVE. Following an appearance on The Oprah Winfrey show, and investment from The Atelier Fund, a Compagnie Richemont Investment Vehicle the company evolved from cotton basics into wider contemporary collections, known as ADAM.

Lippes was inducted into the Council of Fashion Designers of America in 2007, and staged his first formal runway show New York Fashion Week 2007, making the cover of Women's Wear Daily. Vanity Fair put him on its "Next Establishment" list in October 2007. ADAM opened its own shops in New York City, Buffalo, and Bryn Mawr, Pennsylvania and worked with Mango with collections sold around the world.

In August 2010, ADAM was acquired by Kellwood Company. After the parting of Kellwood's CEO Michael Kramer, Lippes bought back his label in 2012.

In 2013, the Adam Lippes brand made its debut. The Adam Lippes brand is based on Lippes's core concept of understated and luxurious designer sportswear with an emphasis on refined fabrics and tailoring. The collection was met with critical acclaim and appears regularly in the press and on style influencers worldwide.

Adam Lippes produces four collections annually: Pre-Spring, Spring/Summer, Pre-Fall, and Fall/Winter. The brand is represented in over 75 luxury retailers in 20 nations and online. Current retailers include Bergdorf Goodman, Matches, Neiman Marcus, Net-a-Porter, and Saks Fifth Avenue.

For Fall 2015, Adam Lippes was the annual designer partnership with Target.

On Inauguration Day 2025, Melania Trump wore one of his dresses, a navy silk wool double-breasted coat, combined with a black and white hat designed by New York-based milliner Eric Javits. Beneath her coat, there was a silk wool pencil skirt and an ivory silk crepe blouse, all in white. The First Lady had previously worn Lippes several times. Michelle Obama, Jill Biden and Kamala Harris also favored creations by the New York designer.

== Personal life ==
Lippes is active in fundraising for the Sandra F. Lippes Foundation at Roswell Park Comprehensive Cancer Center, and has been a co-chair at the Whitney Museum of American Art and on the board of God's Love We Deliver.

He lives in New York City and the Berkshires.
