= Verrier =

Verrier is both a surname and a given name. Notable people with the name include:

- Sarah Verrier (born 2002), Australian rules footballer
- Urbain Le Verrier (1811–1877), French mathematician
- Verrier Elwin (1902–1964), British anthropologist, ethnologist, and tribal activist
