= Rubin Singer =

American fashion designer

- Born: 22 July 1978 (age 47); Vienna, Austria
- Occupation: Fashion Designer

Rubin Singer is an American fashion designer. He is a Vienna-born, Paris-raised, New York-based American. Singer lives and works in New York City.

Singer has worked with and created for an extensive list of A-list artists, including Shakira, Iman, Jennifer Lopez, Cardi B, Ariana Grande, Taylor Swift, Glenn Close, Mariah Carey, Zendaya, Kate Walsh and Alicia Keys. His costumes for Beyoncé featured in the Super Bowl Half-Time Show on February 3, 2013. Rubin Singer and his works have been addressed in hundreds of articles in the press.

Singer continued a dynasty of Russian fashion. He was the son of immigrants from the USSR who, after departing the Soviet Union, first settled in Paris, and then in New York. His father, Alex Singer, is a third-generation designer; he designed costumes for the Bolshoi Theater and Stanislavsky theatre. His grandfather and namesake Rubin Singer created clothes for the highest officials of the USSR, including Stalin.

Singer mastered the profession in the care of his father. He then went to study at Central Saint Martins in London. After his time at Central Saint Martins, Singer began working in New York. There he worked as an associate designer for Oscar de la Renta. Later, Bill Blass scouted him and hired Singer as head designer for Blass' three licensees. Next, Singer became head designer at the newly created Kai Milla company, named after the wife of Stevie Wonder. After two years at Kai Milla and the launch of the company, Singer left and focused on creating his own collection. Singer debuted with his collection during the New York Fashion Week in 2007 and has since created over ninety women’s couture and ready-to-wear clothing collections.
