= Nicholai =

Nicholai is a given name and a surname.

- Byron Nicholai
- Nicholai Olivia "Nicky" Hilton-Rothschild, or Nicky Hilton (born 1983), American socialite, fashion designer, and model
- Nicholai Seagal Natividad or Nikko Natividad (born 1993), Filipino actor, model and dancer
- Alternative spelling of some given names equivalent to Nicholas

== See also ==
- Nicolai
