= Yeohlee Teng =

American fashion designer (born 1951)

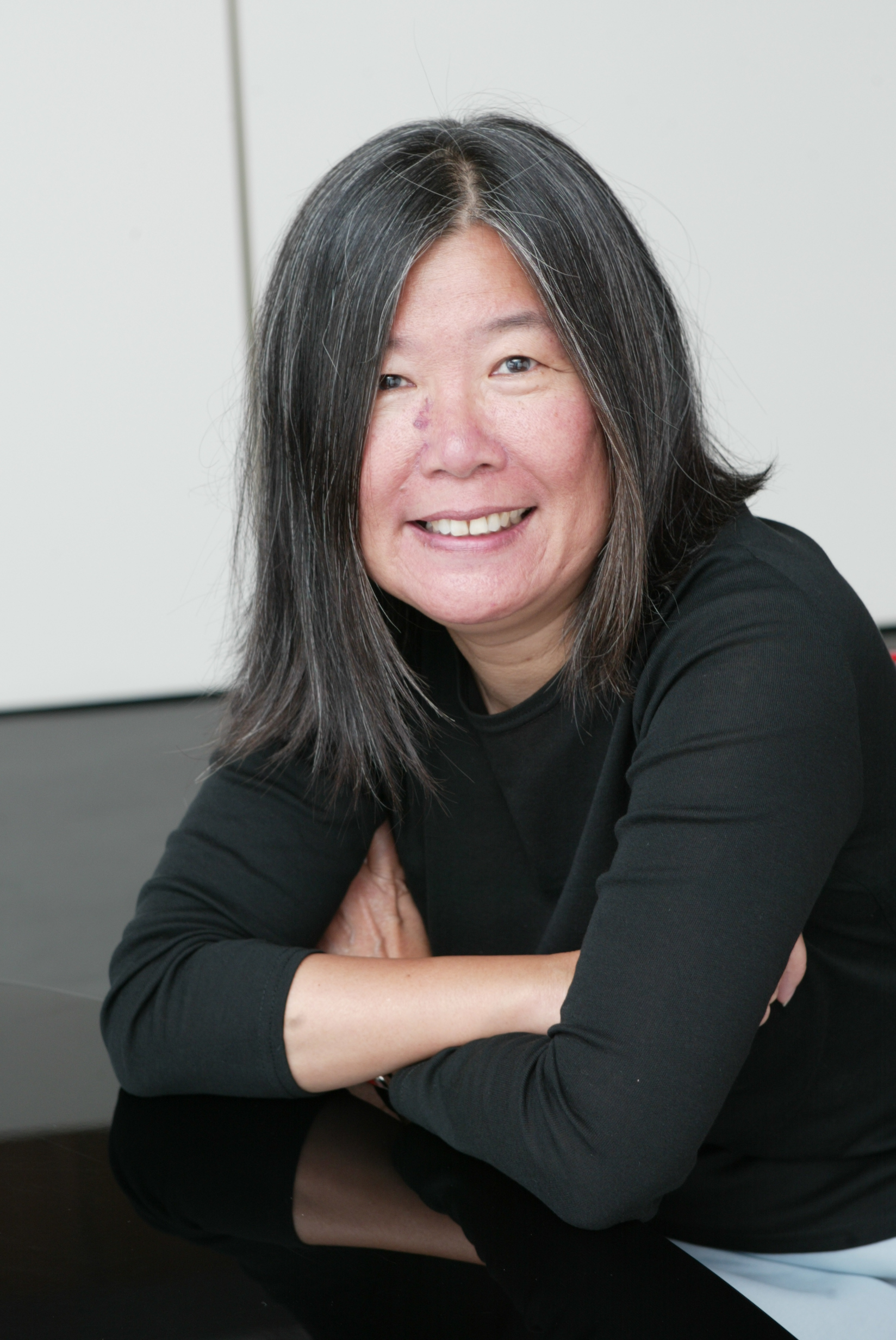
- Born: 1951 (age 74–75); Penang, Malaysia
- Education: Parsons School of Design
- Occupation: Fashion designer

Yeohlee Teng (born 1951) is an American fashion designer originally from Malaysia and of Chinese heritage. She received the Smithsonian's Cooper-Hewitt National Design Award for fashion design in 2004. Her work has been displayed at the Metropolitan Museum of Art, New York and Victoria & Albert, London.

== Education ==
Teng was born in 1951 in Malaysia. She hails from Penang where she attended St. George's Girls' School. She moved to New York in the 1970s to study fashion at the Parsons School of Design, New York. She has worked primarily in New York City and established her own house, YEOHLEE inc in 1981.

== Work ==
Yeohlee practices sustainable and universal design. She uses zero waste methods to create multi-functional garments. Yeohlee believes that "clothes have magic." She dresses the "urban nomad", a term she coined for her Fall 1997 collection, defining a lifestyle that requires clothing that works on a variety of practical and psychological levels. She is a master of design management and believes in the efficiency of year-round, seasonless clothes.

Andrew Bolton, curator of the Costume Institute of the Metropolitan Museum of Art, stated that Yeohlee shares the vision of the Victoria and Albert Museum founders to both promote and further the use of newly developed processes within the field. On her views on decoration, Bolton stated that Yeohlee views ornament as intrinsic to their construction and as acceptable only when justified by construction, lending her dresses distinction and refinement while empowering the wearer and facilitating movement.

Yeohlee published YEOHLEE: WORK in 2003, which surveys the 20 years of her practice with essays by prominent fashion, art and design curators and critics.

Yeohlee spearheaded the Made in Midtown project as General Secretary on the board of the Council of Fashion Designers of America and in partnership with the Design Trust for Public Space and Making Midtown YEOHLEE’s collections are designed, developed and produced in New York’s Garment District. Today the store and workroom is located at 12 West 29th Street in the NoMad/ Flatiron District. Yeohlee Teng is on the board of the Municipal Art Society of New York.

== Exhibitions ==
Her clothing designs have been creative and unusual right from the beginning of her career in the early 1980s. She believes that clothing is an intimate form of architecture. She has established her name for strong geometric designs and concise functualism.

Exhibitions of her designs have been held for more than 40 years now. Yeohlee's work, often described as "architectural," attracted the attention of critics and professionals in other fields of design. To an extent unusual for fashion designers, her clothes were exhibited as design art in many museums and galleries in the 1990s and early 2000s. Her participation in the group show Intimate Architecture: Contemporary Clothing Design, presented at the Hayden Gallery at the Massachusetts Institute of Technology in 1982, won a great deal of favorable attention for her work and was an important factor in the early success of her company. Quoted in the New York Times, designer Issey Miyake said Yeohlee's exhibit "proves that fashion no longer has to be separated from the other design fields. At its best, it is considerably more than a craft. It must represent its time. That M.I.T. has staged this show validates fashion and may inspire students here not to become electrical engineers but engineers of fashion.''

- ultracontemporary, Phoenix Art Museum, October 27, 2018 - March 24, 2019
- Fashion Unraveled, The Museum at FIT, May 25, 2018 - November 17, 2018
- YEOHLEE | SERRA at Phoenix Art Museum, March 17, 2017 - May 29, 2017
- Folk Couture: Fashion and Folk Art, American Folk Art Museum, January 21, 2014 - April 23, 2014
- Front Row: Chinese American Designers, Museum of Chinese in America, April 26, 2013 - December 1, 2013
- IMPACT: 50 Years of the CFDA, The Museum at FIT, February 10, 2012 - April 17, 2012
- Yield: Making Fashion Without Making Waste, The Dowse Art Museum, New Zealand, March 26, 2011 - June 26, 2011
- American Beauty: Aesthetics and Innovation in Fashion, The Museum at FIT, November 6, 2009 - April 10, 2010
- YEOHLEE: Design For Now, Crow Collection of Asian Art, Dallas, TX, October 3, 2009 - January 3, 2010
- Fashioning Felt, Cooper-Hewitt National Design Museum, New York, NY, March 6 - September 7, 2009
- Breaking the Mode: Contemporary Fashion from the permanent collection, Los Angeles County Museum of Art, September 17, 2006 - January 7, 2007
- blog.mode: addressing fashion, Costume Institute, Metropolitan Museum of Art, New York, NY, December 18, 2007 - April 13, 2008
- Exoticism, The Museum at FIT, New York, NY, November 27, 2007 - May 7, 2008
- Contromoda, Centre for Contemporary Arts at Palazzo Strozzi, Florence, Italy, October 12, 2007 - January 20, 2008
- Luxury, The Museum at FIT, New York, NY, May 23 - November 10, 2007
- SKIN+BONES: Parallel Practices in Fashion and Architecture, Somerset House, London, April 24, 2008 - August 10, 2008, Somerset House, London, April 24, 2008 - August 10, 2008; The National Art Center, Tokyo, June 6, 2007 - August 13, 2007; Museum of Contemporary Art (MOCA), Los Angeles, November 19, 2006 - March 5, 2007
- THE FASHION OF ARCHITECTURE: Constructing the Architecture of Fashion, Center for Architecture, New York NY, January 11, 2006 - March 11, 2006
- The New China Chic, Festival of China, The John F. Kennedy Center for the Performing Arts, Washington, DC, October 2005
- YEOHLEE: SUPERMORDERN STYLE, The Museum at FIT, New York, NY, October 23, 2001 - January 5, 2002
- YEOHLEE: Fashion in Motion, Victoria & Albert Museum, London, October 30 - December 4, 2000
- The Super Modern Wardrobe, London College of Fashion, London, November 2 - December 6, 2000
- Mutations//Mode 1960:2000, Palais Galliera, Paris, March 30 - July 31, 2000
- China Chic: East Meets West, The Museum at FIT, New York, NY, February 16 - April 24, 1999
- Energetics: Clothes and Enclosures, Aedes East Gallery, Berlin, May 22 - June 19, 1998 and the Netherlands Architecture Institute, Rotterdam, August 1 - September 6, 1999
- Cubism and Fashion, Costume Institute, Metropolitan Museum of Art, New York, NY, December 10, 1998 - March 14, 1999
- The New Couture, Museum of the City of New York, New York, NY, November 20, 1984 - June 16, 1985
- Yeohlee Teng/ Fashion, MoMA PS1, New York, NY, January 22 - March 18, 1984
- Intimate Architecture: Contemporary Clothing Design, Hayden Gallery, Massachusetts Institute of Technology, Cambridge, MA, May 15 - June 27, 1982

== See also ==
- Chinese Americans in New York City

== Sources ==
- Chou, Jerome, ed. Making Midtown: A New Vision for a 21st Century Garment District in New York City. Design Trust for Public Space, 2012.
- Khoo Salma Nasution, Alison Hayes & Sehra Yeap Zimbulis: Giving Our Best: The Story of St George's Girls' School, Penang, 1885-2010, Areca Books, 2010.
- Major, John, ed. YEOHLEE : WORK. Australia: The Images Publishing Group Pty Ltd, 2003.
- Sidlauskas, Susan, Intimate Architecture: Contemporary Clothing Design, Cambridge, MA: MIT, 1982.
