= Miss Sixty =

Italian fashion brand

- Industry: Fashion
- Founded: 1991
- Founder: Wicky Hassan
- Headquarters: Guangzhou, China
- Area served: Worldwide
- Products: Jeans, footwear, fashion accessories
- Owner: Trendy International
- Website: www.misssixty.com

Miss Sixty (stylized as MISS SIXTY or MISS 60) is an Italian fashion brand specializing in denim ready-to-wear and fashion accessories.

== History ==
Wicky Hassan founded Miss Sixty in 1991.

In 2000, they launched their own line of footwear, followed by eyewear in 2002 and children's clothing in 2004.

In 2010, Miss Sixty closed half of their 20 remaining stores in the US following the closure of two stores the previous year.

In 2012, it was acquired by a Chinese company Trendy International Group.

=== Trendy International ===
Trendy International is a Chinese fashion house founded in 1999, owns domestic women's brands Ochirly and Five Plus as well as male casualwear line Trendiano. The Chinese fashion group is present in more than 290 cities around the world and operates more than 3,000 shops, according to its website. In 2015, Trendy International set up a joint venture with U.K. clothing chain SuperGroup Plc to expand the Superdry brand in China.
