= Tracy Reese =

American fashion designer

- Born: February 12, 1964 (age 62); Detroit, Michigan
- Education: Parsons School of Design
- Labels: Tracy Reese; Plenty; Frock!; Tracy Reese Black Label

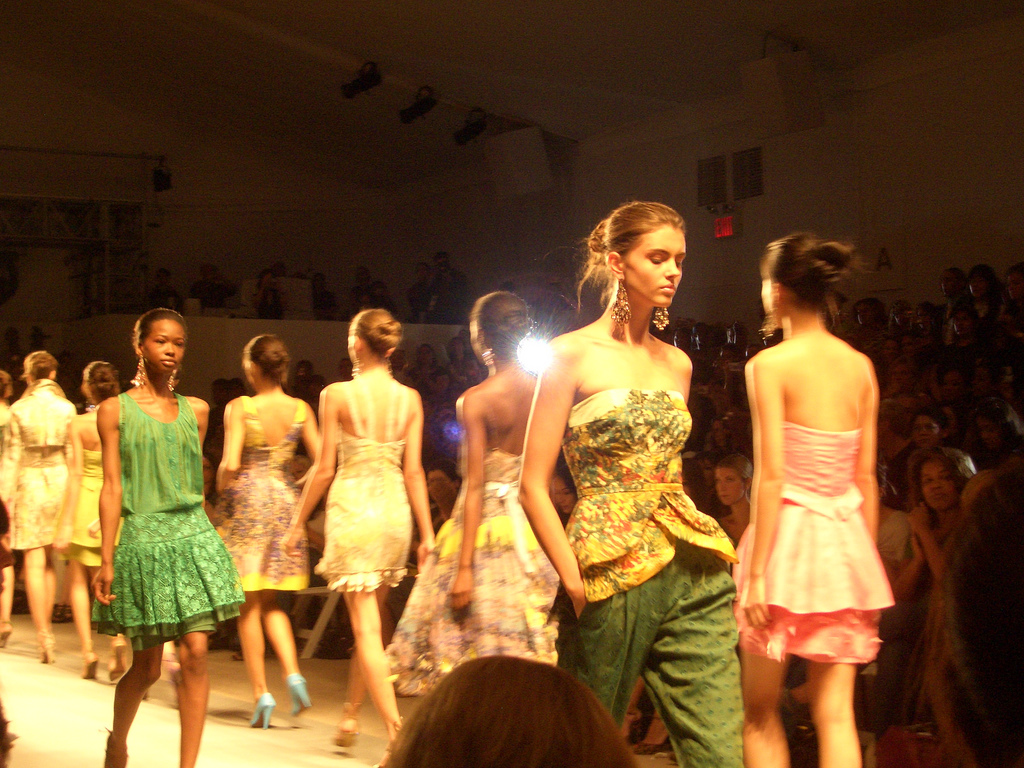
Tracy Reese designs, 2008.

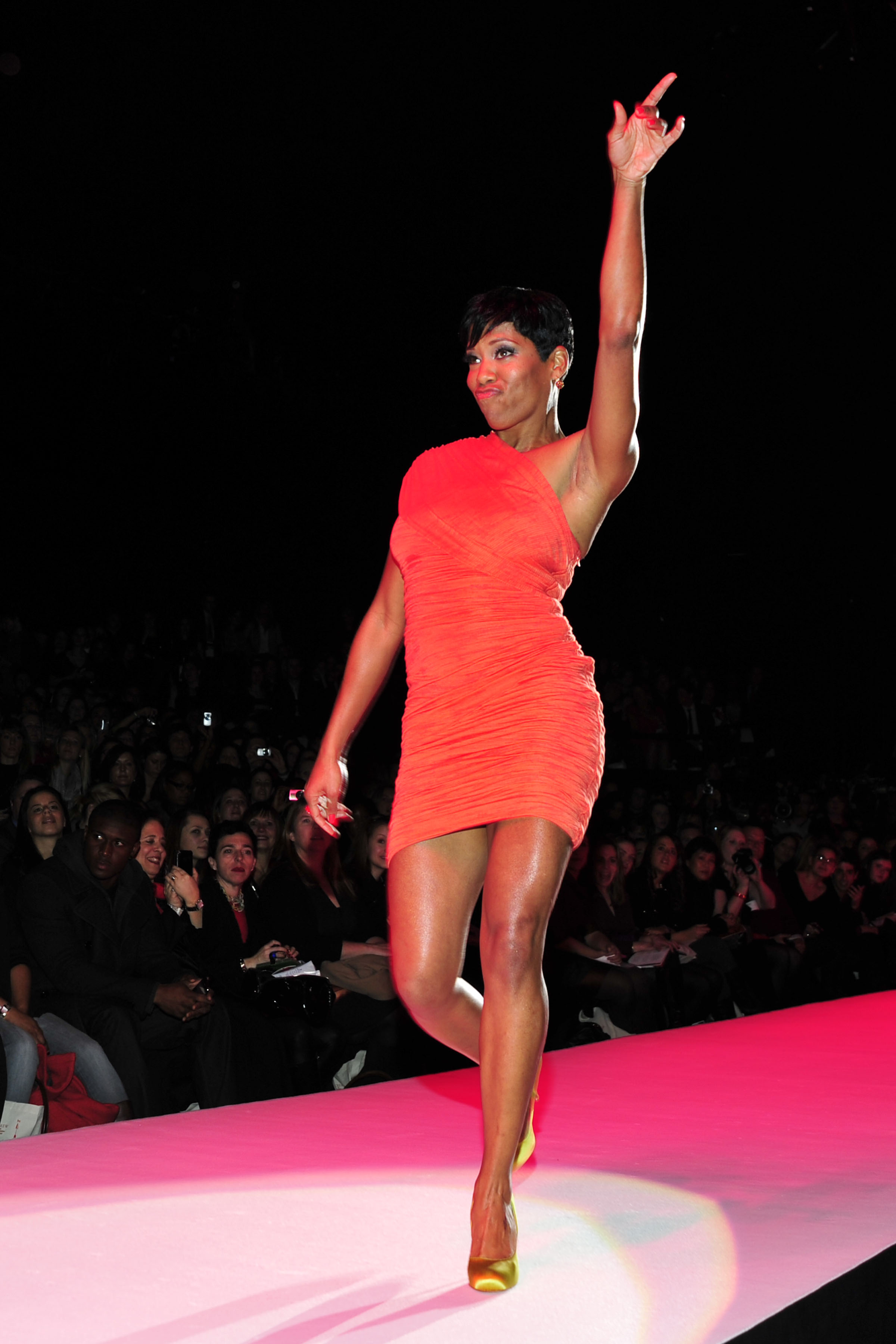
Regina King in Tracy Reese (2010)

Tracy Reese (born February 12, 1964) is an American fashion designer who specializes in women's ready-to-wear clothing, accessories, and home fashions such as linens. She is a board member of the Council of Fashion Designers of America, having been inducted in 2007.

== Early life ==
Reese is originally from Detroit, Michigan, and graduated from Cass Technical High School. She recalls making clothing from scratch while growing up, alongside her mother, while they worked sitting side by side at their own sewing machines. In 1982, she moved to New York City to pursue her education at Parsons School of Design. After graduating with an accelerated degree in 1984, Reese worked under Martine Sitbon at the firm Arlequin. She worked at several top fashion design houses, and eventually became head of the Women's Portfolio for Perry Ellis before launching her own label.

== Tracy Reese label ==
The Tracy Reese fashion label was launched in New York City in 1998. The Tracy Reese label produces both ready-to-wear and resort wear. Plenty (2000) and Frock! (2006) were launched as mass market lines at a more affordable price range. Plenty has a focus on home fashions. Tracy Reese Black Label launched in 2009.

Tracy Reese designs are noted for their femininity and retro-influenced style; the textiles themselves make use of bright colors, elaborate graphic patterns, and a playful use of bohemian touches. Clothing and home fashions by Tracy Reese's design lines are carried by retailers such as Bloomingdale's, Bergdorf Goodman, Neiman Marcus, Anthropologie, Modcloth, and Nordstrom. The Tracy Reese flagship store in New York City opened in 2006. In a New York Times interview on the occasion of the store's five-year anniversary, Reese expressed optimism about current trends continuing to support her design vision:

We love pretty, we like beautiful, flattering, color! That’s what people come here for. There was a moment when big stores weren’t into that but our customer always was, and she was coming here".

In 2011, a second exclusive Tracy Reese store opened, this one in Tokyo.

Reese has a number of celebrity clients, including First Lady Michelle Obama, who wore Tracy Reese dresses during a First Family visit to Hawaii in 2011/2012, at a ceremony in 2013 commemorating the 50th anniversary of Martin Luther King Jr.’s “I Have a Dream” speech, and on other occasions. The First Lady also wore a custom-made Tracy Reese dress for her 2012 DNC Convention speech.

== Collaborations ==
Reese has several collaborations underway as of 2011, which include:

- Tracy Reese for HUE hosiery (Fall 2007 to Present);
- Tracy Reese for Sally Hansen (Fall 2007 to Present);
- Plenty by Tracy Reese for Keds (Spring 2009 to Present).
- Tracy Reese by Jamberry (February 2016 through August 2016)
- United Airlines worldwide uniform renewal program (2018–Present; deferred in 2020)

== See also ==
- Council of Fashion Designers of America
- List of fashion designers
