= Yigal Azrouël =

Israeli fashion designer

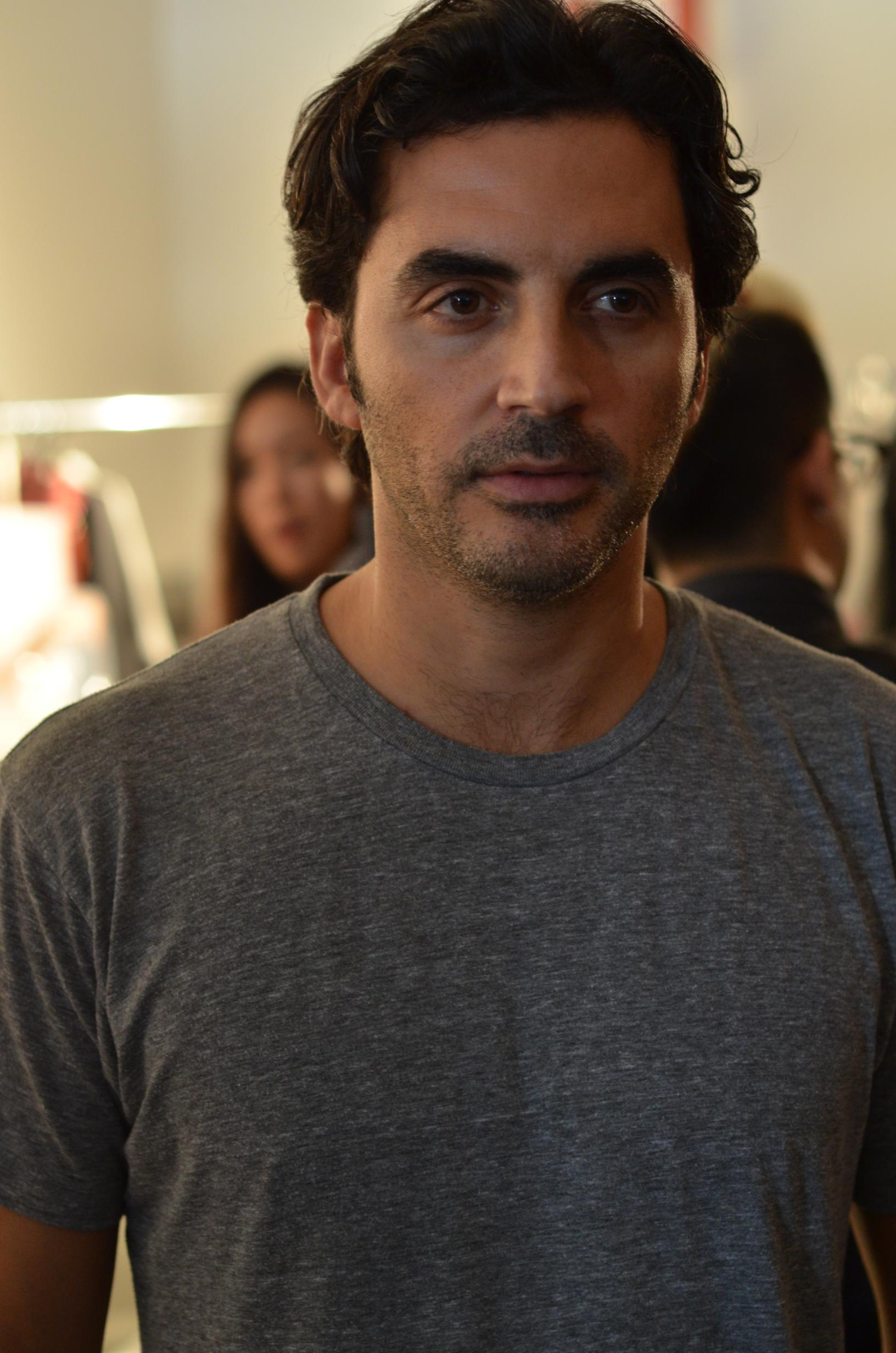
Yigal Azrouël, September 2011

Yigal Azrouël (Hebrew: יגאל אזרואל) is an Israeli American New York–based fashion designer.

== Career ==
An avid surfer, Azrouël was born and raised in Ashdod, Israel, of French-Moroccan descent. His parents own a few sports and fashion stores in Ashdod. He debuted his eponymous ready-to-wear collection in the fall of 1998. In 2000, Yigal opened his atelier and showroom in New York's Garment District, where 80% of his collections are manufactured today, and began his participation at New York Fashion Week .

In February 2003, he opened his first freestanding boutique, designed by Dror Benshetrit, in Manhattan's Meatpacking District on West 14th Street. By 2004, Yigal Azrouël was inducted into the Council of Fashion Designers of America. In October 2004, he showed his Spring Summer 2005 collection at the Hôtel Ritz Paris for his first international showing. In 2009, Yigal was nominated for GQ Best New Menswear Designers in America.
