= Duckie Brown =

American fashion designer

Duckie Brown is a fashion designer based in New York City. It was founded in 2001 by Steven Cox and Daniel Silver. According to Duckie Brown's mission statement, it seeks to "[dress] men beautifully" through its designs.

== History and operations ==
Duckie Brown was started as a men's fashion label in 2001. In January 2014, it added a women's fashion line.

== Collaborations ==
In 2009, Duckie Brown collaborated with Florsheim Shoes to create a line of men's shoes. Another collaboration followed in 2012 with Perry Ellis International, for whom they created a menswear collection called Perry Ellis by Duckie Brown.

== Awards ==
In 2007 and 2013, Duckie Brown was nominated by the Council of Fashion Designers of America (CFDA) for its Menswear Designer of the Year award, alongside Ralph Lauren and Calvin Klein. At some time, Daniel Silver and Steven Cox won a CFDA Award.
