= Carlos Miele =

Brazilian fashion designer

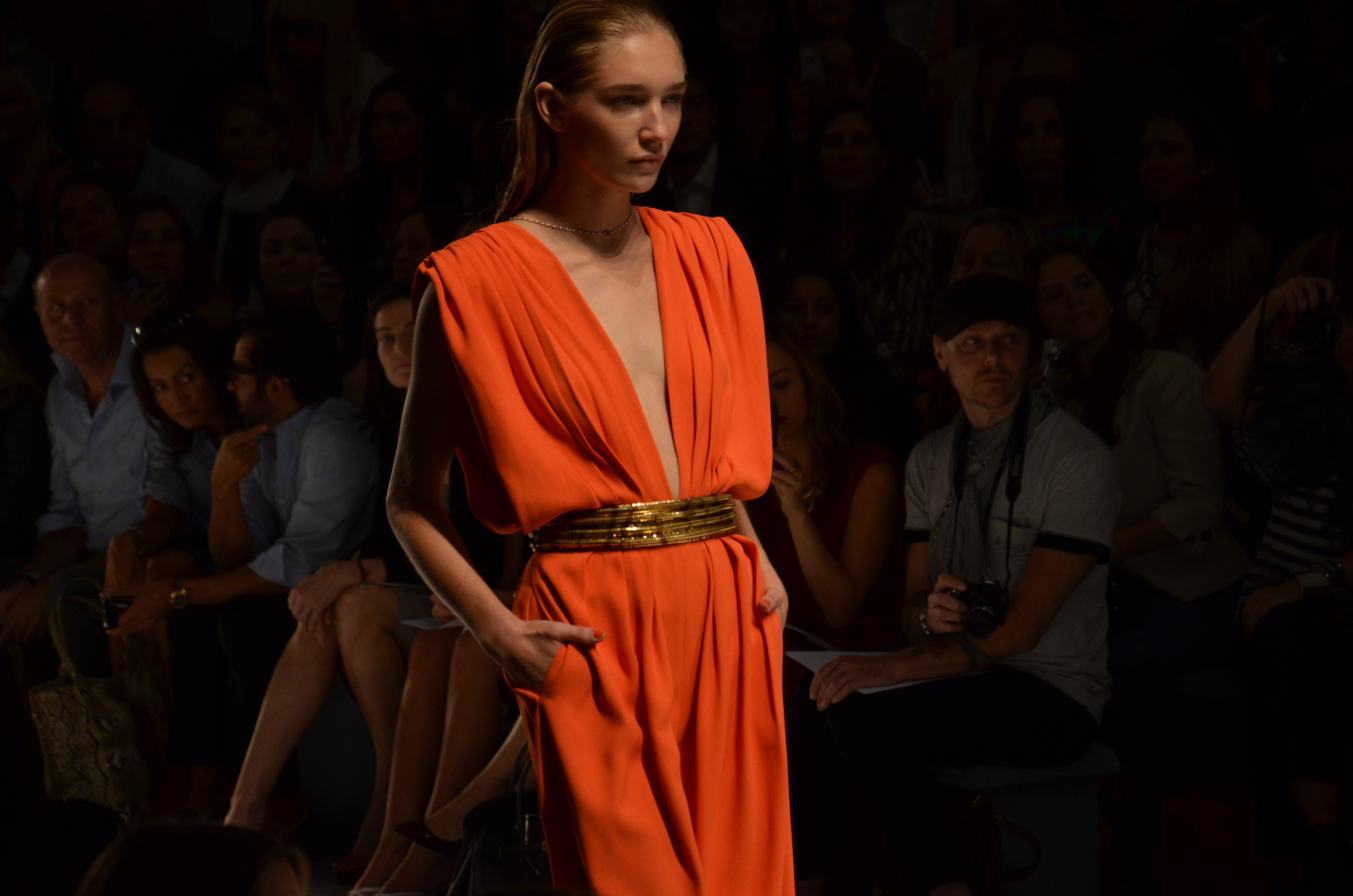
- A Carlos Miele label design in 2011
- Born: Manaus, Amazonas, Brazil
- Education: Fundação Getulio Vargas (FGV)
- Labels: Carlos Miele; Miele

Carlos Miele is a Brazilian fashion designer. His labels sell in more than 30 countries worldwide. He specializes in women's ready-to-wear collections. He established his own label, Carlos Miele, in 2002, and a second label, Miele, in 2006. Carlos Miele is based in São Paulo, Brazil.

== Background ==
Carlos Miele is a self-trained clothing designer, and began his design career creston bc "creating performance art and crafting installations for museums and exhibit venues around the globe". In addition to clothing design, he remains interested in cinema and architecture. The first flagship Carlos Miele shop in New York City was designed by architect Hani Rashid, and was the New York City entry to the International Architecture Biennale of São Paulo.

Despite his interest in many facets of design, he pursued business studies at the Fundação Getulio Vargas (FGV), an elite Latin American institution.

Miele has dual Brazilian and Italian citizenship; he is the grandson of Italian immigrants to Brazil.

== Carlos Miele label ==
The Carlos Miele label was established in 2002. In 2006, the label Miele was established to offer women's ready-to-wear designs in a more casual style and at a somewhat lower price range than the Carlos Miele label. Carlos Miele also produces a line of premium denim.

Carlos Miele designs play with unexpected results that come from mixing technology and traditional handcrafted design. His designs are also influenced by Brazilian artisan creations, and his clothing frequently features traditional Brazilian elements supplied by regional artisan cooperatives. Miele in fact works with artisans in Brazil's favelas and indigenous communities to ensure fair trade practises and fair wages for the artisans.

He has been noted for a "flair for dramatic presentations", with sensual flowing and clinging fabrics being characteristic. Suzy Menkes noted the emphasis on blending technology with elemental nature themes in the designs of several shows during the 2012 Spring-Summer shows in New York City; Miele commented, "I see a dialogue between artificial and natural, modified beauty and organic, technology and life".

Carlos Miele signature clothing is sold in more than 30 countries; as of 2011, there are Carlos Miele flagship stores in New York City, Paris and São Paulo.

== See also ==
- List of fashion designers
