= Rebecca Taylor (fashion designer) =

New Zealand fashion designer

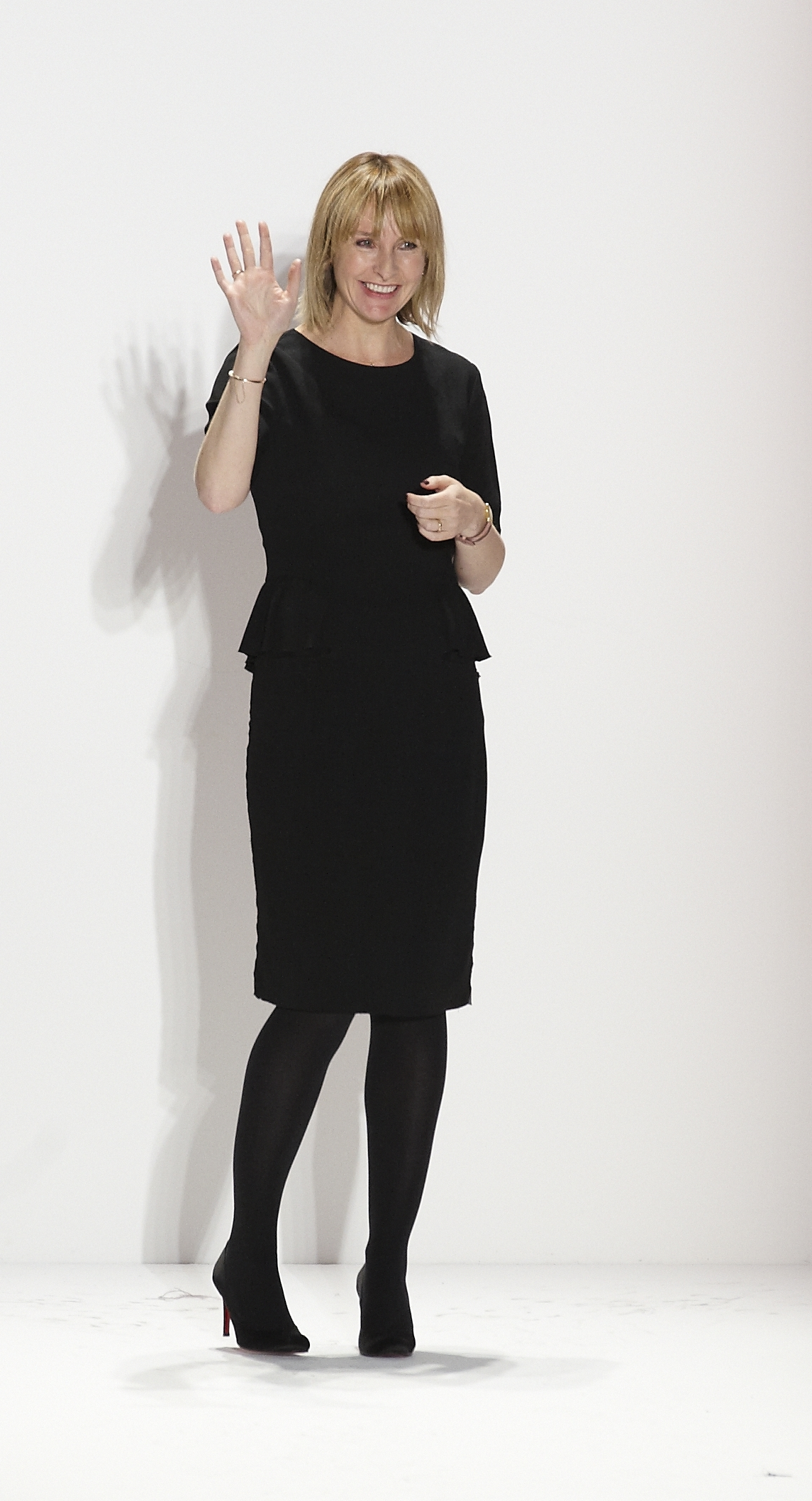
- Rebecca Taylor at the presentation of her fall 2010 collection
- Born: September 5, 1969; New Zealand
- Known for: Fashion design
- Spouse: Wayne Pate

Rebecca Taylor (born September 5, 1969) is a New Zealand-born fashion designer based in New York City, United States. Her retail outlets include boutiques in Japan. Her company was reported in 2003 as having a US$12 million turnover. Taylor's garments have been worn by celebrities such as Cameron Diaz, Reese Witherspoon, and the casts of 90210 and Sex and the City.

== Background ==
In New Zealand, Taylor attended Wellington High School. She received her initial fashion training as part of Access, a government scheme, training at the Bowerman School of Design. She then went on to study Fashion Design at Wellington Polytechnic (now Massey University). One of her first jobs on the scheme was making clothes for Peter Jackson's Meet the Feebles’ puppet characters. After arriving in New York with $600 to her name, Taylor was eventually hired by fashion designer Cynthia Rowley, under whom she worked for six years.

She débuted at New York Fashion Week as part of the Gen Art Styles competition in the late 1990s, before doing her own catwalk show in 1999.

In 2007, Taylor was inducted into the Massey University College of Creative Arts Hall of Fame.

In 2018, Taylor announced a move to Paris for a year.

== Personal life ==
She is married to Wayne Pate, who was introduced to her via mutual friends. Her younger sister, Victoria Taylor, is a nationally known jewellery designer in Wellington, New Zealand, and débuted her Tory Jewellery Company range at one of Rebecca Taylor's catwalk shows in New York.

== Rebecca Taylor Brand ==
In January 2011, the Rebecca Taylor brand was acquired by Kellwood Company and Sun Capital Partners.

In August 2019, Taylor stepped away from her company to pursue other fashion opportunities.

In November 2019, Rebecca Taylor brand was acquired by Vince, a California-based contemporary label.

In October 2023, CreditRiskMonitor reported that Rebecca Taylor's parent Vince Holding was nearing a potential Chapter 11 bankruptcy filing.
