= Alice Temperley =

English fashion designer

Alice Temperley MBE
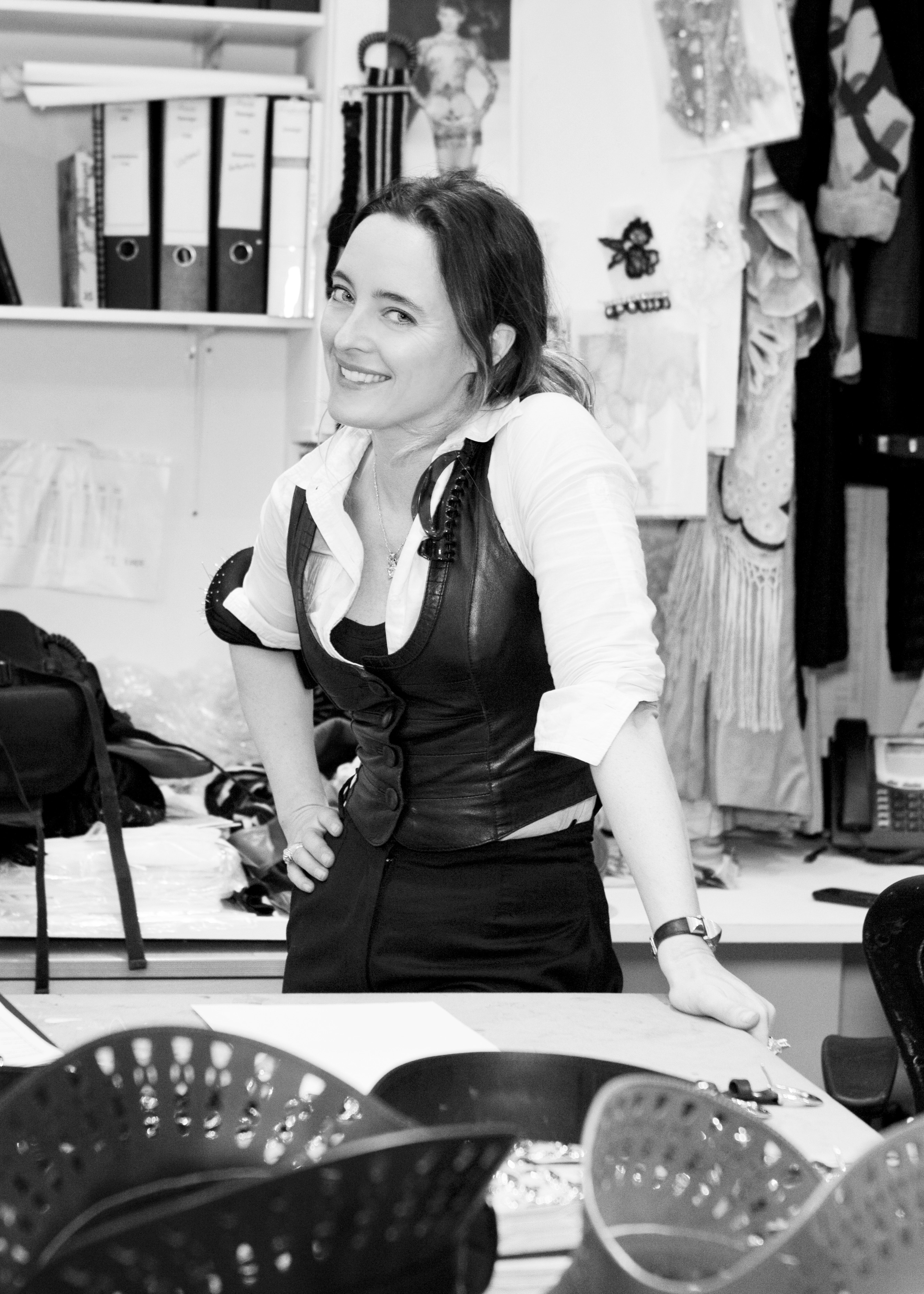
- Born: 22 July 1975 (age 50); Somerset, England
- Education: Huish Episcopi Academy, Strode College, Central Saint Martins, Royal College of Art
- Label: Temperley London

Alice Temperley MBE (born 22 July 1975) is an English fashion designer based in Ilminster, Somerset, England. Her fashion label, Temperley London, was launched in 2000.

In 2006, The Guardian noted that she had been described by American Vogue as the designer making the biggest waves in British fashion. More recently, she has been described as the "English Ralph Lauren".

== Career ==
Alice Temperley grew up in Somerset, on her parents' cider farm and graduated from the Royal College of Art and Central Saint Martins. She established Temperley London, together with her then boyfriend Lars von Bennigsen in 2000. The brand has become known for its focus on luxurious fabrics and hand-finishes.

Temperley hosted her first fashion show in Notting Hill, London in 2003. In 2005, she moved her fashion shows to New York where she showed until 2011 (with the exception of the Spring Summer 2009 show in London). The brand's tenth anniversary show was held at the British Museum.

For four consecutive seasons, from 2009 to 2011, Temperley presented her collections via multimedia installations rather than traditional catwalk shows.

== Company ==
The company is privately owned and run by Alice Temperley

In 2012, it was reported that Temperley London producing 10 collections across three lines, including cruise and pre fall collections. A fourth line, Somerset by Alice Temperley was introduced as a high-street collaboration in 2012.

=== Brands and retail activity ===
Temperley Bridal launched in 2007. In spring of 2010 Temperley London launched ‘ALICE by Temperley', a diffusion line targeting a younger demographic and containing more affordable and casual pieces. The range was carried by major department, including Harvey Nichols, Selfridges and Harrods in London, Neiman Marcus in New York, Isetan in Japan and Net-A-Porter online. This line has been closed, under CEO Ulrik Garde Due (who joined in 2013), in order to focus on: "one brand and one message".

Temperley has five stand-alone boutique stores with the head office quarters in Ilminster, Somerset with a flagship on Mayfair's Bruton Street and an occasion-wear boutique in Notting Hill. Further stand-alone stores are located in Los Angeles, Dubai and Doha. Additionally, Temperley London is sold in 300 stores in 37 countries.

Somerset by Alice Temperley, the designer's first high street collaboration, launched with British retailer John Lewis in September 2012. The line is the fastest selling fashion collection in the department store's history.

== Recognition ==
Temperley has received multiple awards, including English Print Designer of the Year in 1999 at Indigo, Paris and Elle magazine's Best Young Designer of the Year Award in 2004. She was named one of Britain's top 35 female business leaders in 2006 and Designer of The Year at the Hollywood Style Awards in 2011.

Temperley was appointed an MBE in the 2011 New Year Honours for services to the fashion industry.

Wearers of Temperley designs have included the Duchess of Cambridge and her sister Pippa Middleton. Pippa Middleton wore a floor-length green Temperley gown for the evening reception at her sister's wedding. Her dresses have also been worn by Madonna, Beyoncé, Penélope Cruz, Thandiwe Newton and Portia Freeman. Other fans of the brand include Eva Mendes, Halle Berry and Sarah Michelle Gellar.

== Personal life ==
Temperley met her husband, Lars von Bennigsen in 1998, while working as a waitress at the Met Bar in Mayfair. They married in 2002 in a 1920s-style wedding covered by the UK edition of Vogue.

In 2008, Temperley gave birth to her first child, a son. She and her husband separated in 2012.

=== Political views ===
In the aftermath of the October 2023 terrorist attack by Hamas on Israel, Temperley wrote on her Instagram account: "The West helped create Hamas through decades of torment and devastation in Gaza. If you blow kids and their families up and trap them in a massive prison with constant kidnapping and bombardment, then of course they are going to seek revenge and be very angry (as I would be in their position)." Temperley added: "No freedom, no rights and now genocide threatening 2.2 million people who are being refused aid, food and water." According to The Daily Telegraph, she "posted her thoughts on the events in the Middle East under a picture of what appears to be one of her children holding some freshly harvested plums." The post was subsequently edited to state that she is "heartbroken for the innocent lives lost of BOTH sides", with Temperley writing: "To see 2.2 million people suffer for Hamas's terrible actions is abominable." Comments on the post were disabled, and she added another post calling for a "ceasefire" of Israeli air strikes in Gaza. Her original post drew criticism from her followers.
