= Abaeté (clothing) =

Abaeté was a French-Brazilian fashion label designed by Laura Poretzky-Garcia. It premiered in 2004 with her line "Japanese-inspired resort." In 2007, Abaeté was the first designer to collaborate with Payless Shoes. In 2010, Abaeté ended its operations.
