= Erin Fetherston =

American fashion and interior designer

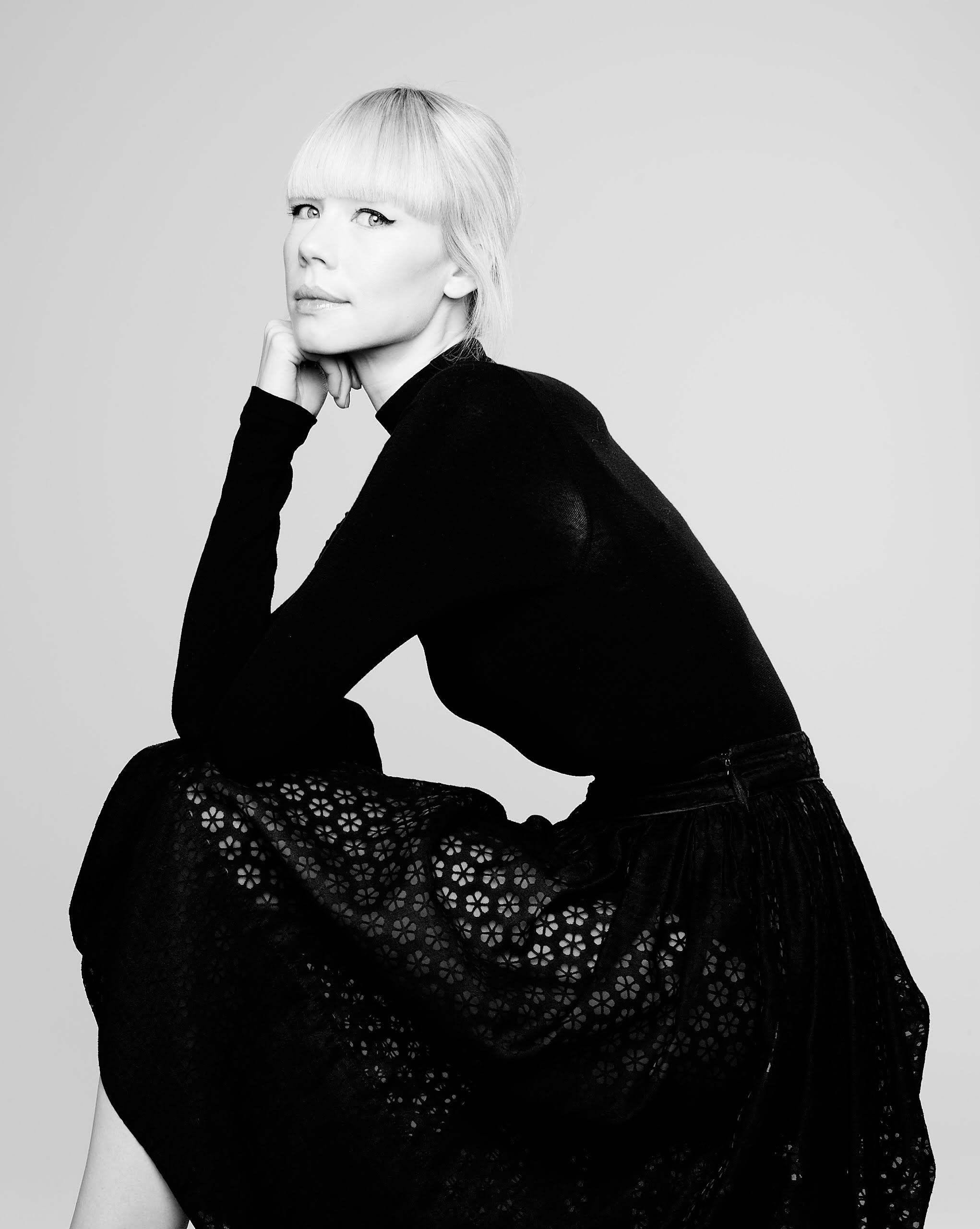
- Fetherston in 2018 (photo: Juan Algarin)
- Born: August 22, 1981 (age 45); San Francisco, California
- Occupations: Fashion designer; interior designer
- Spouse: Gabe Saporta (m. 2013)

Erin Fetherston (born August 22, 1981) is an American fashion and interior designer. She launched her eponymous womenswear label in Paris in 2005 and moved the business to New York City two years later, showing ready-to-wear collections during New York Fashion Week. Her early work brought a 2007 Ecco Domani Fashion Foundation Award, a place among the ten finalists for that year's CFDA/Vogue Fashion Fund and membership of the Council of Fashion Designers of America in 2009.

Fetherston reached a wider audience in November 2007 with a limited-run collection for Target, and between 2010 and 2011 worked as guest designer and creative consultant at Juicy Couture. In 2011 she put her designer collection on indefinite hold and replaced it with a lower-priced line, Erin. She later moved into interior design, working mainly on residential projects, and in 2023 designed a furniture and apparel collection for the retailer Anthropologie.

== Early life and education ==
Fetherston grew up in Piedmont, California, in the San Francisco Bay Area. She graduated from the University of California, Berkeley with a degree in visual arts in 2002, then studied fashion design at the Paris campus of Parsons School of Design. She remained in Paris for five years after enrolling, and launched her womenswear collection while she was there.

== Career ==
In January 2005, she first presented her eponymous label during the Paris Haute Couture Shows. In 2007, Fetherston moved to New York City, where she showed ready-to-wear collections during New York Fashion Week.

Actresses in Hollywood took an early interest in the label, and Fetherston went on to work on collaborative projects with the photographer Ellen von Unwerth and with Kirsten Dunst, Zooey Deschanel and Karen Elson. Von Unwerth, a friend and mentor from Fetherston's years in Paris, shot a short film starring Dunst that was screened on a loop during Fetherston's fall 2006 show.

Fetherston was a recipient of the 2007 Ecco Domani Fashion Foundation Award, a finalist for the 2007 CFDA/Vogue Fashion Fund, and in 2009 was inducted as a member of the CFDA. She was one of ten finalists that year, selected from 101 applications; the top prize went to Rogan Gregory, and Phillip Lim and Philip Crangi were named runners-up.

In November 2007, her limited-time discount line debuted at the nationwide retailer Target.

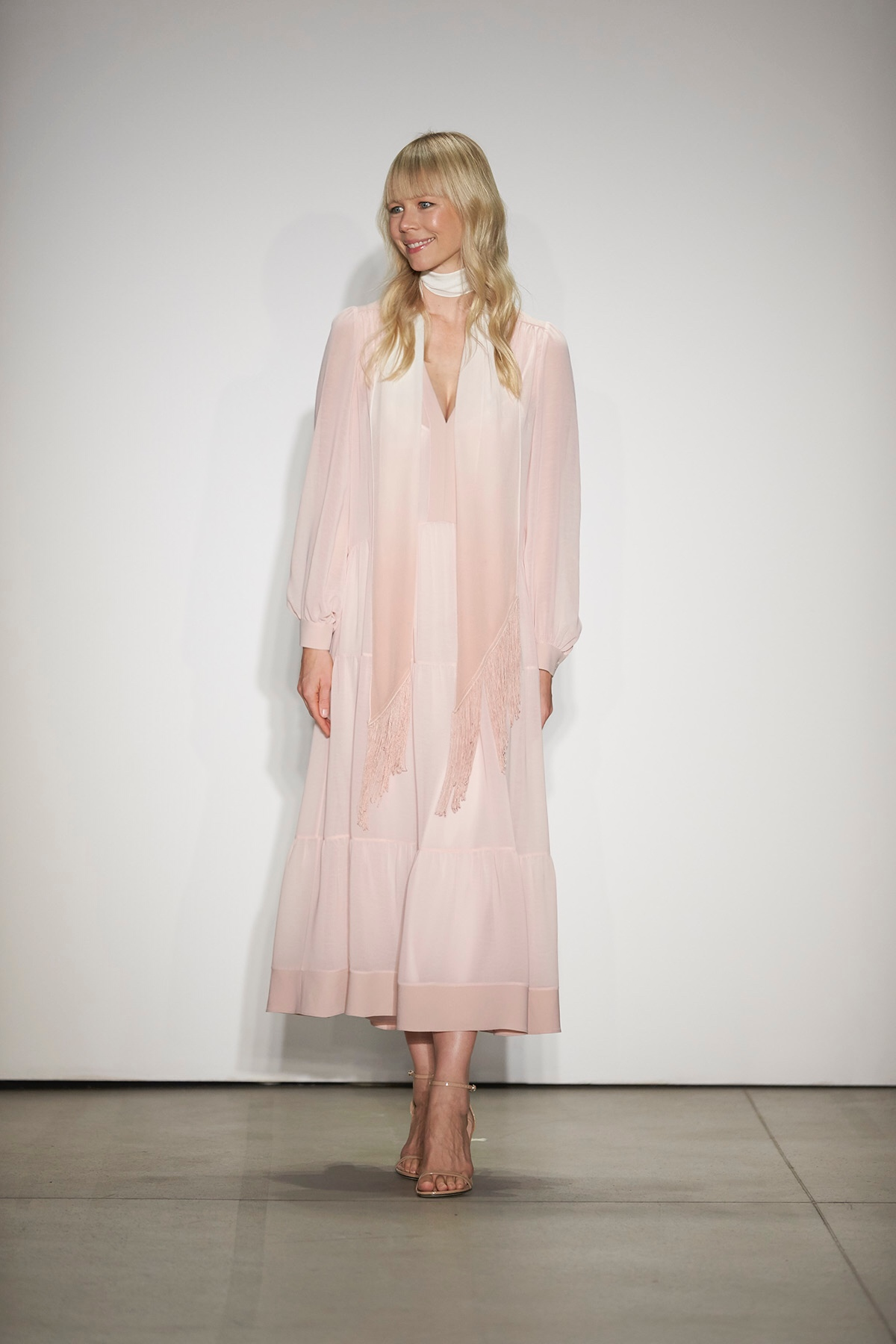
Fetherston in 2017

In April 2010, Fetherston was named guest designer and creative consultant at Juicy Couture. She took up the role on May 1 that year under an agreement announced as running to the end of 2011, and kept designing her own label at the same time.

As the Juicy Couture arrangement wound down at the start of 2011, Fetherston placed her namesake designer collection on indefinite hold and prepared a lower-priced line called Erin, which was presented during New York Fashion Week and reached stores that fall.

Priced from $73 to $250 at wholesale, the new line was conceived as a stand-alone label rather than a secondary range, and leaned toward everyday sportswear instead of the party dresses of the main collection. Fetherston put the change down to the Target and Juicy Couture collaborations, which had shown her how many customers were priced out of her designer range, and to the weak economy; the Juicy Couture partnership was due to finish the following month, and she brought in Stefani Zien, previously of Rachel Roy, as director of sales and marketing.

=== Interior design ===
Fetherston later moved into interior design, working mainly on residential projects.

In August 2023, Fetherston and the retailer Anthropologie released a collaboration of 25 home products and six dresses, sold exclusively through the retailer's website from August 10 and priced from $34 for a candle to $3,498 for an upholstered sofa.

== Personal life ==
In May 2013, Fetherston married musician Gabe Saporta, and in February 2016, they had a son. The couple, who had become engaged on New Year's Eve, married at the St. Nicholas Abbey estate in Barbados, with Fetherston wearing a gown of her own design.

Fetherston lives with her family in Los Angeles, and the Erin Fetherston brand has expanded to include apparel, home goods and accessories.
