= Tadashi Shoji =

Japanese fashion designer

- Born: January 15, 1948 (age 77); Sendai, Japan
- Citizenship: American, Japanese
- Education: Los Angeles Trade–Technical College
- Occupation: Fashion Designer
- Label: Tadashi Shoji
- Website: tadashishoji.com

Tadashi Shoji (born January 15, 1948) is an American-based Japanese fashion designer known for his evening wear and bridal collections, and his red-carpet fashion. The Tadashi Shoji brand is carried in over 700 major department and specialty stores worldwide, with signature boutiques in the United States, Indonesia, and the Middle East. The company operates offices in Los Angeles and Shanghai, as well as showrooms in New York City, Tokyo, and Osaka.

== Early life ==
Shoji was born in Sendai, Japan. He began painting and drawing at a young age and eventually moved to Tokyo where he studied fine art. He apprenticed with Jiro Takamatsu, a contemporary artist making art in Japan during the 1960s and 1970s. Shoji worked for three years in Takamatsu's studio making conceptual art. Sensing the political unrest brewing in Japan and encouraged by opportunity abroad, Shoji moved to the United States in 1973 to attend college and further his artistic development. He attended Los Angeles Trade–Technical College (L.A. Trade–Tech) where he studied fashion design. As a student, Shoji apprenticed with costume designer Bill Whitten. Shoji worked alongside Whitten, who created designs for musicians including Elton John, Stevie Wonder, Neil Diamond, The Jacksons, and Earth, Wind, & Fire. After graduation, Shoji worked for designer-turned-critic Richard Blackwell.

== Career ==
Shoji launched his eponymous brand in 1982. He stated he was inspired to branch out on his own when he noticed that women had few choices in the contemporary market when it came to special occasion dresses. With his intellect as an artist and his acumen for business, he pioneered a new category of evening wear. He mixed stretch fabrics with easy-to-wear elegant silhouettes, and combined couture dressmaking techniques with skillful engineering, making it possible for pieces to be mass-produced and designed to fit all figures. He is known for designing for all ages, all ethnicities, and all figures. Shoji uses figure-flattering techniques, such as draping, ruching, and pintucks to accentuate the positives. Signature pieces include draped jersey gowns, pleated chiffon gowns, and shutter pleated cocktail dresses. His brand categories include evening wear, bridal, plus-size, kids, fragrance, shapewear, and intimate apparel.

Tadashi Shoji was a sponsor of Miss Universe Pageant from 2002 to 2007. He designed the opening dresses as well as the evening wear Miss Universe would wear to her events in her winning year. Riyo Mori was the last Miss Universe who wore Shoji's evening gowns during her title Miss Universe 2007. Shoji is the official designer for the Tournament of Roses Royal Court.

Shoji debuted his runway collection at the New York Fashion Week in September 2007. His runway collections have been well received by Vogue.com, Women's Wear Daily, and other notable publications. In June 2012, Tadashi Shoji was one of 26 new members accepted into The Council of Fashion Designers of America (CFDA).

In 2018, Shoji debuted his affordable luxury bridal collection, which is known for both its versatility and rich assortment of pieces, and in 2019, Shoji launched his diffusion line SHO.

Women worldwide seek out his designs for their impeccable fit, trademark ease, and modern sense of femininity.

Shoji's evening wear has been worn by stars at many red-carpet events and awards shows, including Olympic gold medalist, Mirai Nagasu (for the 2018 Academy Awards), Oscar Winner Octavia Spencer, Kate Beckinsale, Dita Von Teese, Oscar Winner Mo'Nique, Helen Mirren, Katy Perry, Kate Hudson, Paris Jackson, Demi Lovato, Drew Barrymore, Miranda Kerr, Lea Michele, Sofia Richie, Kaley Cuoco, Heather Graham, Fan Bingbing, Carrie Underwood, Anna Kendrick, and Janelle Monáe (2014 Met Gala).

Octavia Spencer wore a custom-made Tadashi Shoji gown to the 84th annual Academy Awards, where Spencer won Best Supporting Actress for her performance in The Help.

First Lady Michelle Obama wore a Tadashi Shoji gown to the Obama Administration’s 8th White House State dinner held in honor of the Prime Minister of Japan, Shinzo Abe.

== Retail ==
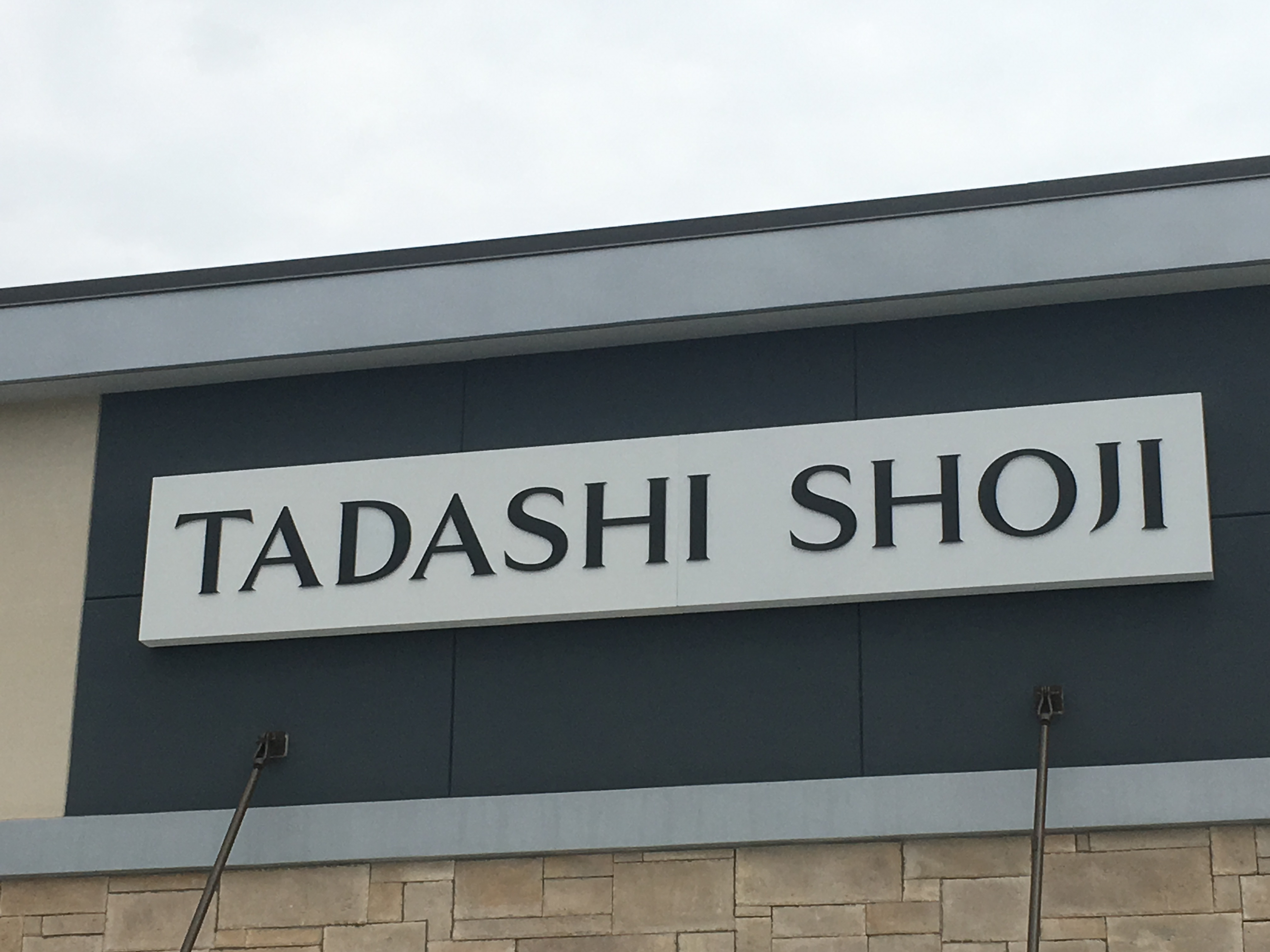
Tadashi Shoji shop sign in Maryland

Shoji opened his first signature boutique at South Coast Plaza in Costa Mesa, California in 2004. He has since opened boutiques in Las Vegas, Pennsylvania, Virginia, and two more in California. Unfortunately, as of September 2019, only his South Coast Plaza and Fashion Show Mall locations remain. In April 2012, Tadashi Shoji launched an e-commerce website selling an edited collection of occasion dresses and bridal gowns.

Shoji also designs and produces capsule wedding collections for the affordable bridal retailer David's Bridal and the Anthropologie-owned bridal e-tailer BHLDN.

Shoji expanded his international reach by opening two locations in Jakarta, Indonesia. In 2016, he opened a signature boutique in Doha, Qatar as part of a franchise partnership with Qatar-based Al Mana Group. Then in 2018, he opened a premier boutique at the second level of Rustan's in Manila, Philippines.
