= CFDA Fashion Awards =

American fashion designer awards

The CFDA Fashion Awards are annual fashion prizes awarded by the Council of Fashion Designers of America. Founded in 1980 with the first awards given in 1981, they honor and showcase excellence in fashion design. They have been sometimes referred to as "the Oscars of fashion".

Nominations are submitted by the Fashion Guild, a group of over 1,500 CFDA members including fashion editors, retailers, and stylists. Award winners are determined by vote and announced at an annual black tie event held in Manhattan. Award winners receive a trophy made by the New York firm Society Awards.

== History ==
=== 1980s ===
The 1981 awards were given out at the first annual CFDA awards ceremony on January 14, 1982 at a dinner in the New York Public Library. The winners had been announced two months before the ceremony which was originally scheduled for a television extravaganza in the fall of 1981. CFDA president Bill Blass had set off controversy when he announced that all of the nominees will be named winners to avoid televising designers as they lose awards. In response, nominee Geoffrey Beene rejected the award and said, "The industry needs a major award for its merit, not its emotion."

Under new CFDA president Perry Ellis, the 1984 CFDA awards in January 1985 had a broadened set of awards that included special citations for MTV, Nike billboards, and Details magazine. According to Donna Karan, who headed the awards committee, "We wanted these awards to go beyond designers. It's all about creativity and the whole scope of fashion." James Galanos received the first CFDA "Lifetime Achievement Award" in 1984, which the CFDA named after Geoffrey Beene. At the 1984 awards, Bill Blass presented the "Eugenia Sheppard fashion award" to Earl Blackwell and said it would be given annually "for outstanding contribution to fashion journalism."

The CFDA Awards were staged at the New York Public Library until they moved to the Metropolitan Museum of Art for the 1986 awards in January 1987. The CFDA's first "Perry Ellis Award" for new fashion talent was given to David Cameron in 1986, the award was named after the former council president who died that year.

=== 1990s ===
The CFDA's first "International Award" was given to Gianni Versace in 1992. Princess Diana attended the awards in January 1995 to present a special award to her friend Elizabeth Tilberis, the British-born Editor-in-Chief of Harper's Bazaar.

In 1997, for the first time, the CFDA did not release all of the award winners before the awards ceremony. The nominees of the "Perry Ellis Awards" were announced at a press conference in November 1997 but the winners were not named until the February 1998 awards ceremony. In 1999, the date of the event was changed from January to June when the awards were televised for the first time, as the 18th Annual American Fashion Awards on E! Entertainment Television, marking the beginning of a five-year partnership with General Motors.

In 1997, the CFDA Fashion Awards began including emerging designers.

=== 2000s ===
The CFDA's first "Fashion Icon Award" was given to American socialite C.Z. Guest in 2002. The award was given to Nicole Kidman in 2003 and to Sarah Jessica Parker in 2004. The CFDA decided to forgo the award in 2005, and instead gave the "Award for Fashion Influence" to Kate Moss. In 2002, the CFDA Fashion Awards also began a 17-year partnership with Swarovski that ended in 2019. In 2003, the awards for new designer talent, formerly known as the "Perry Ellis Awards", were renamed "Swarovski's Perry Ellis Awards" and included a monetary prize for the first time to reflect the sponsorship.

== CFDA Fashion Award winners ==
=== 1980s ===
Year	Geoffrey Beene Lifetime Achievement Award	Womenswear Designer	Menswear Designer	Accessory Designer	Emerging Talent Award	International Award	Special Awards	Notes
1981	none	Geoffrey Beene; Perry Ellis; Calvin Klein (tie)	Jhane Barnes; Ralph Lauren; Alexander Julian (tie)	Barry Kieselstein-Cord (jewelry); Alex Mate and Lee Brooks (costume jewelry); Nancy Knox (men's shoes) (special awards for each)	none	Yves Saint Laurent (worldwide influence/International Fashion Award)	Robert Lighton - khaki sportswear; Andrew Fezza - leather for men (or Award for Menswear); Fernando Sanchez - Excellence in At-Homewear and Lingerie.	
1982	none	Norma Kamali	Perry Ellis	none	none	Karl Lagerfeld for Chloé (outstanding designer outside the U.S.)	Outstanding fashion illustrator: Antonia Lopez.; Outstanding fashion photographer: Bill Cunningham.	
1983	none	Calvin Klein	Perry Ellis	Patricia Underwood (hats)	none	Issey Miyake; Giorgio Armani		
1984	James Galanos	none	none	none	Stephen Sprouse (best new designer)	none	Astor Place Hair Designers - influence on contemporary hair design in America; Annie Flanders - fresh approach to fashion journalism as editor and publisher of Details magazine; Kitty D`Alessio, president of Chanel - "revitalizing Chanel's image in the U.S.;"; John Fairchild, chairman of Fairchild Publications - M magazine; Ira Neimark and Dawn Mello - rejuvenating Bergdorf Goodman/leadership in retailing; Peter Moore - Nike billboard advertising campaign; Bruce Weber - fashion advertising photography; Robert W. Pittman, executive vice president of MTV - MTV's role in modern communications and its influence on fashion/"opening our eyes to a new medium"; Diana Vreeland, special consultant to the Costume Institute of the Metropolitan Museum of Art - "unparalleled contribution to the world of fashion as an art."	
1985	Katharine Hepburn; Alexander Liberman	Donna Karan (outstanding designer of the year); Geoffrey Beene; Liz Claiborne; Norma Kamali (outstanding video presentations)		Robert Lee Morris (jewelry); Ray-Ban (sunglasses)	none	none	Michael Mann, producer of the television series Miami Vice, for its overall style influence.; Claudio Segovia and Héctor Orezzoli for bringing Tango Argentino to Broadway. Special tribute and fashion show for designer; Rudi Gernreich who died in 1985.	
1986	Bill Blass; Marlene Dietrich	Geoffrey Beene (outstanding American designer of the year); Donna Karan ("impact on the total look of fashion"); Ralph Lauren (retailer of the year)		none	David Cameron	Christian Lacroix for Patou	Dalma Callado, model - personifying the spirit of fashion for 1986; Elsa Klensch, the style editor of Cable News Network - bringing fashion to television; and Elle magazine.	
1987	Giorgio Armani		Ronaldus Shamask		Marc Jacobs			
1988	Richard Avedon; Nancy Reagan		Bill Robinson					
1989	Oscar de la Renta	Isaac Mizrahi	Joseph Abboud					

=== 1990s ===
Year	Geoffrey Beene Lifetime Achievement Award	Womenswear Designer	Menswear Designer	Accessory Designer	Perry Ellis Award for New Talent	International Award	Eugenia Shepard Award	Special Awards	Notes
1990	Martha Graham	Donna Karan	Joseph Abboud	Manolo Blahnik	Christian Francis Roth	none	Genevieve Buck, fashion editor of The Chicago Tribune.	Emilio Pucci for design and color genius; Anna Wintour, editor-in-chief of Vogue, for contribution to fashion.; Special tribute to Roy Halston Frowick.	
1991	Ralph Lauren	Isaac Mizrahi	Roger Forsythe for Perry Ellis	Karl Lagerfeld for Chanel	Todd Oldham	none	Marylou Luther of the Los Angeles Times Syndicate.	* Women of the Arts awards: actress Anjelica Huston, opera singer Jessye Norman, and dancer/choreographer Judith Jamison.: Special awards went to Harley Davidson for bringing motorcycle leather jackets and bike accessories into the mainstream of fashion, and Marvin Traub, former chairman of Bloomingdale's, for retail innovation.	
1992	Pauline Trigère	Marc Jacobs for Perry Ellis	Donna Karan	Chrome Hearts	Anna Sui	Gianni Versace (Italy)		Audrey Hepburn for a Lifetime of Style and her commitment to the children of the world, Steven Meisel for photography; Patrick O'Connell for the Ribbon Project of Visual AIDS.	
1993	Judith Leiber and Polly Allen Mellen	Calvin Klein	Calvin Klein	none	Richard Tyler (womenswear); John Bartlett (menswear)	Prada (accessories) (Italy)	New York Times photographer Bill Cunningham; s	Special award for sneakers shared by Converse, Adidas, Keds, Nike and Reebok; special award for art direction for Fabien Baron, creative director of Harper's Bazaar.; Salute to CFDA founder Eleanor Lambert.	
1994	Carrie Donovan, Bernadine Morris, and Nonnie Moore	Richard Tyler	none	Robert Lee Morris (womenswear); Gene Meyer (menswear)	Victor Alfaro and Cynthia Rowley (tie) (womenswear); Robert Massimo Freda (menswear)	none	Patrick McCarthy, executive vice president of Fairchild Publications.	Special awards went to Elizabeth Tilberis, editor in chief of Harper's Bazaar, for contribution to the fashion industry/editorial achievement; Sara Lee Corp. for "The Year of the Wonderbra"; Kevyn Aucoin for "The Artistry of Makeup".; Special tribute to Jacqueline Kennedy Onassis for her "lifetime of style and grace and influence on American fashion."	
1995	Hubert de Givenchy	Ralph Lauren	Tommy Hilfiger	Hush Puppies	Marie-Anne Oudejans for Tocca (womenswear); Richard Tyler and Richard Edwards (by Richard Bengtsson and Edward Pavlick) (tie) (menswear); Kate Spade (accessories)	Tom Ford for Gucci	Suzy Menkes of International Herald Tribune;	Lifetime of Style Award - Lauren Bacall; The Dom Perignon Award for Humanitarian Leadership - Bill Blass.; Special awards went to Isaac Mizrahi and Douglas Keeve for the film Unzipped, for bringing the fashion world into the theater; Robert Isabell for floral design.	
1996	Arnold Scaasi	Donna Karan	Ralph Lauren	Elsa Peretti for Tiffany & Co	Daryl Kerrigan for Daryl K (womenswear); Gene Meyer (menswear); Kari Sigerson and Miranda Morrison for Sigerson Morrison (accessories)	Helmut Lang (Austria)	New York Times fashion critic Amy Spindler; and s	Dom Perignon award for Humanitarian Leadership - Kenneth Cole; Special award for "furthering fashion as art and culture" - Metropolitan Museum of Art Costume Institute's curator Richard Martin and associate curator Harold Koda.	
1997	Geoffrey Beene	Marc Jacobs	John Bartlett	Kate Spade	Narciso Rodriguez (womenswear); Sandy Dalal (menswear)	John Galliano (Great Britain) for Dior		Lifetime of Glamour Award - Elizabeth Taylor; Dom Perignon Award for Humanitarian Leadership - Ralph Lauren; Stiletto Award - Manolo Blahnik; Global Influence on Fashion - Anna Wintour; Lifetime Tribute Award (or Lifetime Recognition Award) - John Fairchild, retired chairman and editorial director of Fairchild Publications.; Special tributes for Princess Diana and Gianni Versace.	
1999	Yves Saint Laurent	Michael Kors	Calvin Klein	Marc Jacobs	Josh Patner and Bryan Bradley for Tuleh (womenswear); Matt Nye (menswear); Tony Valentine (accessories)	Yohji Yamamoto (Japan)	Elsa Klensch of CNN;	Lifetime of Glamour Award - Sophia Loren; Influence on Fashion Award - Cher; Humanitarian Award (posthumous) - Liz Tilberis; Timeless Talent Award - Betsey Johnson; Window on Fashion Award - Simon Doonan; and award "for putting the spotlight on Hollywood and fashion" - InStyle magazine.	

=== 2000s ===
Year	Geoffrey Beene Lifetime Achievement Award	Womenswear Designer	Menswear Designer	Accessory Designer	Emerging Talent Award	International Award	Notes
2000	Valentino	Oscar de la Renta	Helmut Lang	Richard Lambertson & John Truex for Lambertson Truex	Miguel Adrover (womenswear), John Varvatos (menswear), Dean Harris (accessories)	Jean-Paul Gaultier (France)	
2001	Calvin Klein	Tom Ford	John Varvatos	Reed Krakoff for Coach	Daphne Gutierrez and Nicole Noselli for Bruce (womenswear), William Reid (menswear), Edmundo Castillo (accessories)	Nicolas Ghesquiere (France) for Balenciaga	
2002	Karl Lagerfeld and Grace Coddington	Narciso Rodriguez	Marc Jacobs	Tom Ford for Yves Saint Laurent	Rick Owens	Hedi Slimane (France) for Dior Homme	
2003	Anna Wintour	Narciso Rodriguez	Michael Kors	Marc Jacobs	Lazaro Hernandez and Jack McCollough for Proenza Schouler	Alexander McQueen (Great Britain)	
2004	Donna Karan	Carolina Herrera	Sean Combs for Sean John	Reed Krakoff for Coach	Zac Posen (ready-to-wear), Eugenia Kim (accessories)	Miuccia Prada (Italy)	
2005	Diane von Fürstenberg	Vera Wang	John Varvatos	Marc Jacobs	Derek Lam (womenswear), Alexandre Plokhov for Cloak (menswear), Anthony Camargo and Nak Armstrong for Anthony Nak (accessories)	Alber Elbaz (Israel) for Lanvin	
2006	Stan Herman	Francisco Costa for Calvin Klein	Thom Browne	Tom Binns	Doo-Ri Chung (womenswear) and Jeff Halmos, Josia Lamberto-Egan, Sam Shipley, & John Whitledge for Trovata (menswear), Devi Kroell (accessories)	Olivier Theyskens (Belgium) for Rochas	
2007	Robert Lee Morris	Oscar de la Renta, and Lazaro Hernandez & Jack McCollough for Proenza Schouler	Ralph Lauren (also awarded the American Fashion Legend Award)	Derek Lam	Phillip Lim (womenswear), David Neville & Marcus Wainwright for Rag & Bone (menswear), Jessie Randall for Loeffler Randall (accessories)	Pierre Cardin (France)	
2008	Carolina Herrera	Francisco Costa for Calvin Klein	Tom Ford	Tory Burch	Kate and Laura Mulleavy for Rodarte (womenswear); Scott Sternberg for Band of Outsiders (menswear); Philip Crangi (accessories)	Dries van Noten (Belgium)	
2009	Anna Sui	Kate & Laura Mulleavy for Rodarte	Scott Sternberg for Band of Outsiders and Italo Zucchelli for Calvin Klein Collection	Lazaro Hernandez and Jack McCollough for Proenza Schouler	Alexander Wang (womenswear); Tim Hamilton (menswear); Justin Giunta for Subversive Jewelry (accessories)	Marc Jacobs (United States) for Louis Vuitton	

=== 2010s ===
Year	Geoffrey Beene Lifetime Achievement Award	Womenswear Designer	Menswear Designer	Accessory Designer	Emerging Talent Award	International Award	Fashion Icon	Notes
2010	Michael Kors	Marc Jacobs	Marcus Wainwright and David Neville for Rag & Bone	Alexis Bittar	Jason Wu (womenswear); Richard Chai (menswear); Alexander Wang (accessories)	Christopher Bailey (Great Britain) for Burberry	Iman	
2011	Marc Jacobs	Lazaro Hernandez and Jack McCollough for Proenza Schouler	Michael Bastian	Alexander Wang	Prabal Gurung (womenswear); Robert Geller (menswear); Eddie Borgo (accessories)	Phoebe Philo (Great Britain) for Céline	Lady Gaga	
2012	Tommy Hilfiger	Ashley Olsen and Mary-Kate Olsen for The Row	Billy Reid	Reed Krakoff	Joseph Altuzarra (womenswear); Phillip Lim (menswear); Tabitha Simmons (accessories)	Rei Kawakubo (Japan) for Comme des Garçons	Johnny Depp	
2013	Vera Wang	Lazaro Hernandez and Jack McCollough for Proenza Schouler	Thom Browne	Phillip Lim	Erin Beatty and Max Osterweis for Suno (womenswear); Dao-Yi Chow and Maxwell Osborne for Public School (menswear); Pamela Love (accessories)	Riccardo Tisci (Italy) for Givenchy		
2014	Tom Ford	Joseph Altuzarra	Dao-Yi Chow and Maxwell Osborne for Public School	Ashley Olsen and Mary-Kate Olsen for The Row	Shane Gabier and Christopher Peters for Creatures of the Wind (womenswear); Tim Coppens (menswear); Irene Neuwirth (accessories)	Raf Simons (Belgium) for Dior	Rihanna	
2015	Betsey Johnson	Ashley Olsen and Mary-Kate Olsen for The Row	Tom Ford	Tabitha Simmons	Rosie Assoulin (womenswear); Shayne Oliver for Hood by Air (menswear); Rachel Mansur and Floriana Gavriel for Mansur Gavriel (accessories)	Maria Grazia Chiuri and Pierpaolo Piccioli (Italy) for Valentino	Pharrell Williams	
2016	Norma Kamali	Marc Jacobs	Thom Browne	Rachel Mansur and Floriana Gavriel for Mansur Gavriel	Brandon Maxwell (womenswear); Alex Orley, Matthew Orley, and Samantha Orley (menswear); Paul Andrew (accessories)	Alessandro Michele (Italy) for Gucci	Beyoncé	
2017	Rick Owens	Raf Simons for Calvin Klein	Raf Simons for Calvin Klein	Stuart Vevers for Coach	Laura Kim and Fernando Garcia for Monse	Demna Gvasalia (Georgia) for Vetements and Balenciaga	Franca Sozzani ( posthumous)	
2018	Narciso Rodriguez	Raf Simons for Calvin Klein	Supreme	Ashley Olsen and Mary-Kate Olsen for The Row	Sander Lak for Sies Marjan	Donatella Versace (Italy)	Naomi Cambell	
2019	Bob Mackie	Brandon Maxwell	Rick Owens	Ashley Olsen and Mary-Kate Olsen for The Row	Emily Adams Bode for Bode	Sarah Burton (Great Britain) for Alexander McQueen	Jennifer Lopez	

=== 2020s ===
Year	Geoffrey Beene Lifetime Achievement Award	Womenswear Designer	Menswear Designer	Accessory Designer	Emerging Talent Award	International Award	Fashion Icon	Eugenia Sheppard Award	Special Awards	Notes
2020		Gabriela Hearst	Kerby Jean-Raymond for Pyer Moss	Telfar Clemens for Telfar	Christopher John Rogers	Women's - Pierpaolo Piccoli for Valentino Men's - Kim Jones for Dior				
2021	Dapper Dan	Christopher John Rogers	Emily Adams Bode Aujla of Bode	Telfar Clemens for Telfar	Edvin Thompson for Theophilio	Women's - Demna Gvsalia for Balenciaga Men's - Grace Wales Bonner for Wales Bonner	Zendaya	Nina Garcia	Face of the Year: Anya Taylor-Joy Positive Social Influence Award: Model Alliance Founder's Award: Aurora James Environmental Sustainability Award: Patagonia Board of Director's Tribute: Yeohlee Teng	
2022	Laurie Lynn Stark and Richard Stark of Chrome Hearts	Catherine Holstein of Khaite	Emily Adams Bode Aujla of Bode	Raul Lopez of Luar	Elena Velez	N/A	Lenny Kravitz	Patti Wilson	Environmental Sustainability Award" The United Nations Stylist Award: Law Roach Special Anniversary Award: Jeffrey Banks Board of Trustee’s Award: Virgil Abloh Fashion Icon:Lenny Kravitz Positive Social Influence Award: Slaysians of The House of Slay featuring Prabal Gurung, Laura Kim, Phillip Lim, Tina Leung, and Ezra William	
2023	Maria Cornejo	Catherine Holstein for Khaite	Willy Chavarria	Ashley Olsen and Mary-Kate Olsen for The Row	Diotima	Jonathan Anderson (Great Britain) for JW Anderson and Loewe	Serena Williams			
2024	Stephen Burrows	Rachel Scott of Diotima	Willy Chavarria	Raul Lopez of Luar	Henry Zankov for Zankov		Erykah Badu			
2025	Ralph Rucci	Ralph Lauren	Thom Browne	Ashley Olsen and Mary-Kate Olsen for The Row						
2026	Inez Van Lamsweerde and Vinoodh Matadin	Rachel Scott	Ralph Lauren	Ana Khouri	Colleen Allen	Anthony Vaccarello	Peter Marino	Eva Chen		
