= Ricky Clifton =

American interior decorator, designer and florist

- Born: c. 1953; Texas, U.S.
- Occupations: Interior decorator; designer; florist; writer
- Years active: 1970s–present
- Known for: Interior decoration; Floral design

Ricky Clifton (born c. 1953) is an American interior decorator, designer, florist and writer based in New York City. Born in Texas and raised in Fort Worth, he moved to New York in the 1970s and became a fixture of the city's art, fashion and design scenes, first in the circle around Andy Warhol. Over the years he has furnished and decorated homes for artists, gallery owners and designers, among them Philip Taaffe, Diane von Furstenberg, Julian Schnabel, Matthew Marks, and John Currin and Rachel Feinstein. He has also worked as a gallery owner and taxi driver, and as a picture framer for Jean-Michel Basquiat. One profile called him "a Zelig of the culture who has borne witness to a half century of high life in the city, knows everyone, and is the life of every party."

== Early life ==
Clifton was born in Texas and raised in Fort Worth by his mother, who worked as a secretary. He has said that he met Andy Warhol in Dallas while still in high school and told him he planned to move to New York. Warhol told him to call when he got there. "Every time I called the Factory, he'd pick up the phone," Clifton recalled. "He was old-school like that. Artists were like Jewish mothers — there was a community."

Clifton came to New York in the early 1970s on an art-school scholarship. His first jobs were in flowers: he drove delivery trucks for the florist Tony DiPace, whose shop was below Halston's studio, and remembers putting up Lauren Bacall's Christmas tree. He still speaks of DiPace as a forgotten pioneer, "the reason we have orchids at Kmart now".

== Warhol circle and early career ==
In the 1970s Clifton became part of Warhol's circle, and Warhol mentions him several times in his diaries. An early entry, from December 1976, records him photographing Warhol's dog Amos in a pope costume:

Amos was down at the office and Ricky Clifton took pictures of him in costume as the pope.

— Andy Warhol, 1 December 1976

In August 1978 Warhol recorded meeting Clifton at the theater and noted that he had recently been thrown out of Halston's house:

Got tickets for the Actor's Fund performance of Ain't Misbehavin' (6 X $17.50). Cabbed to theater ($2) to meet Jay Johnson, Tom Cashin, Amy Sullivan, and Ricky Clifton. Ricky was asked to leave Halston's the other night when Halston found him looking in his closets. He wasn't stealing, he was just poking around, and he was drunk and fresh with Halston, it was 4 am.

— Andy Warhol, 13 August 1978

Later that year he recorded a gift from Clifton:

Ricky Clifton gave me the most beautiful earrings, little John Travolta earrings.

— Andy Warhol, 6 November 1978

Clifton photographed both of Warhol's dachshunds in costume, as the pope and as Jacques Cousteau. He has also said that he is the "least favorite person Fran Lebowitz ever met".

After the Warhol years he became a protégé of the jewelry designer Elsa Peretti and went on to run a gallery. He drove a taxi, whose passengers included Philip Johnson and Ginger Rogers, and worked as a custom framer, framing work for Basquiat.

Years after he had driven Johnson in his cab, Clifton, working as a cater waiter, found himself pouring wine at the Lever House dinner celebrating the building's rescue from demolition, hosted by Jacqueline Onassis, for whom he had also done flowers. When she asked whether he had changed jobs, he replied that he had also driven a cab and had picked up Johnson twice, who was listening behind him. Johnson remembered him as the passenger from Fort Worth who had called him "the Maria Callas of architecture".

By the early 1980s he was running a small gallery in a storefront on Sixth Avenue at Prince Street, decorated as a traditional Japanese interior, with a futon behind a curtain at the back. Peter McGough, who met him when Clifton was driving a taxi, remembered his passions as Japan, where he had studied ikebana and ceramics, Tina Chow, and opera: "He worshiped Maria Callas." At Christmas he showed ornaments on a small tree in the window, for which he asked artists such as Warhol and Basquiat to paint a bulb. McGough and his partner David McDermott made one, then asked Clifton for a show, and he gave them one in the spring of 1983. McGough also recalled his party-crasher reputation: "Ricky didn't need an invitation—if he wanted to go, he went."

During what would be Warhol's final trip abroad, for the January 1987 opening of his Last Supper exhibition in Milan, he was unwell. Blake Gopnik's biography of Warhol cites Clifton, whom it calls a friend: on opening night Warhol felt well enough to sit through an entire opera at La Scala, though the plan had only been for him to make a brief appearance; his attendance reportedly earned him an invitation to direct a production there, and Clifton said Warhol had suggested staging Puccini's La fanciulla del West in the manner of Lonesome Cowboys. Warhol missed an appointment with Clifton the following night; according to Gopnik, Warhol's diaries confirm that he spent that day in bed with a fever, feeling unwell.

Through it all he kept arranging flowers, for Jacqueline Kennedy Onassis and for Studio 54 among others. In time the flowers were joined by furniture, wallpaper and whole rooms. By 1999 The New York Times Magazine described him as a fixture of the downtown art scene who was "now a decorator too", and by 2006 his friend Glenn O'Brien was calling him "the ultimate personal shopper and decorator to the art world".

== Interior decoration ==
Clifton's decorating work took public shape in the late 1990s. In 1999 he designed and hand-printed the wallpapers in the restrooms of Fressen, a restaurant in the Meatpacking District, and named Nan Goldin and Matthew Marks among his clients. The same year he did the flowers for the apartment of Tom Healy and Fred Hochberg, which was featured in the Times Magazine. In March 2000 Harper's Bazaar devoted a long profile to him, "Interior Motives", by David Colman, with photographs of apartments he had decorated in six locations. The piece follows him through the viewing for an auction of Barbra Streisand's belongings at Christie's East, where he picked out a nineteenth-century pine worktable for the kitchen of his friends Glenn O'Brien and Gina Nanni.

Among the clients Colman named were Philip Taaffe, Francesco Clemente and Alba Clemente, Julian Schnabel, Jacqueline Schnabel, Donald Baechler and the dealer Matthew Marks, a list he likened to "the annual Art in America roster". For Taaffe, Clifton found much of the furniture for his apartment in the Hotel Chelsea and helped shape its look, an Orientalist, Arts and Crafts "late-19th-century bohemian pleasure dome". "If you're capable of withstanding his forays into fantasy," Taaffe said, "he can be an enduring influence." For the artist Judy Hudson he turned an annex of her family's townhouse into a Moroccan-style room with cushions and striped wallpaper, and he restored a Warhol portrait of Laura de Coppet after it was slashed.

Diane von Furstenberg became one of his best-known clients. He convinced her to paint an alcove in her Manhattan living room a "shocking Schiaparelli pink", and he worked on tiles for her, some of them seventeenth-century but so modern-looking that, in his words, "they're like op art". He also found the animal-print planters in her office. Von Furstenberg has described him as "a person who shows up unexpectedly and brings you odd, beautiful pieces that you don't think you need, but end up becoming your favorites". "You throw him out the door and he comes in through the window," she said. "That's Ricky."

In June 2006 Glenn O'Brien wrote in GQ about what he had learned from his friend Clifton, and on the magazine's website he described how Clifton works: "He's an artist who comes to your house and moves your furniture around, tells you what to get rid of and shows up with things you have to buy. Irritatingly, he's almost always right." He illustrated the post with an apartment Clifton had done for the owners of the Zwirner and Wirth gallery. In 2008 W described a five-story townhouse as "outfitted to the hilt by the art world decorating guru Ricky Clifton". That year Clifton also helped O'Brien and his wife, Gina Nanni, furnish their 1940 modernist house in Litchfield County, Connecticut, with twentieth-century furniture and ceramics, much of it found on eBay and international auction sites. He also interviewed the architect Annabelle Selldorf for PIN-UP.

His renovation of the SoHo loft of the artists John Currin and Rachel Feinstein, completed in 2010, was inspired in part by "the homes of third-world dictators and the London members-only club Annabel's", and is still talked about in tastemaker circles. The World of Interiors featured the loft that December, in "The Taming of the Two" by Morgan Falconer, in which Clifton "darted in to contain the stampede" of an animal-horn table, a zebra skin and a leopard-print carpet. In 2012 he found furniture for the Chinatown duplex of Stella Schnabel, whom New York introduced to readers as a client of "the decorator known for his gutsy, no-regrets mixing of styles". That April the home he and the model Agyness Deyn created in Brooklyn was the cover feature of The World of Interiors; "The Talented Mr Ricky", by Eric Boman, invited readers to "picture a mermaid's grotto in Belle Epoque Paris". The curator Alexandra Cunningham Cameron had tracked him down at Deyn's apartment in early 2011 for the magazine CULTURED, and found him lacquering the ceilings; she later wrote of "a designer like Ricky who makes worlds out of sidewalk pickings and paint".

He has also designed beyond homes: Artforum reported that the dealer Jeffrey Deitch's re-creation of Florine Stettheimer's "Collapsed Time Salon" at the early Gramercy Art Fair was designed by Clifton and the artist Jane Kaplowitz.

== Style ==
Clifton calls his approach "nineteenth-century modern". He likes old-fashioned things that "look like today but that aren't from today", and favors turn-of-the-century modernism, Islamic, Indian and Japanese motifs, bright colors and jarring patterns. He insists he has no fixed rules: "I wouldn't rule anything out — that's where the creative part comes in." He also designs furniture on occasion, and a side chair that bears his name is canonical enough to appear in design dictionaries. A cork screen of his is a feature of the West Village apartment of the fashion designer Emily Adams Bode Aujla.

Asked by Selldorf how he would describe what he does, Clifton answered:

I don't know how to describe it. I do painting and sculpture, printing and all that. And I find furniture and objects and I am producing a lot of different things that all become environmental to me — and I never do the same thing twice. When I get desperate about explaining this, I often ask if the person knows who Jorge Pardo is. My gallerist, Lorcan O'Neill, told me not to say that, but I'm using the name as a figure of speech.

— Ricky Clifton, 2008 interview with Annabelle Selldorf

== Reception ==
Colman wrote that he had gained a reputation as "the man who single-handedly arouses the most irritation and adulation in equal measure in the art world". The art historian Robert Rosenblum put it this way: "The world is divided in terms of how adorable or how impossible he is." Those who have worked with him tend to praise the results. Hudson said that he "comes through in spades every time", and von Furstenberg called his taste "very original, very eclectic": "The way he decorates is more about a lifestyle." Jane Kaplowitz, whose own art takes a skeptical view of art-world society, said: "Everyone is so bourgeois. Ricky's taste is very not bourgeois."

O'Brien, who had asked Clifton to help furnish his own home, wrote about him in his style guide How To Be a Man, in a chapter on decorating:

Sometimes when you're stumped you need a consultant, a second opinion. I have allowed Mr. Ricky Clifton, for example, an artist, decorator, and intrepid shopper, to have several vodkas, smoke pot, and then move my furniture around. It's like attending a séance. Of course, a Ricky Clifton doesn't come around every lifetime, but if you find a friend who knows everything about the Meiji Restoration or the Aesthetic movement, or the difference between David Smith and Tony Smith and Harry Smith and Jack Smith, you should hold on to him.

— Glenn O'Brien, How To Be a Man

Colman concluded that in an age when artists live in some of the city's most splendid homes, Clifton brings the creative world "a refreshing dose of la vie boheme".

== Recent work ==
In 2021 Clifton had three renovation projects on the same West Village street ("papa bear, mama bear and baby bear jobs", as he calls them), an auction of his curios and collectibles planned in Hudson, New York, and a series of printed portraits to finish. He had also gone back to a coffee-table book that tries to make sense of his life, which he imagines as a hybrid of a scrapbook and Cecil Beaton's diaries. In 2024 T: The New York Times Style Magazine included him in "The Freaks Who Rule New York" as "The Interior Design Freak", and introduced him as an artist, interior designer and writer.
