= Continental Center (New York City) =

Office skyscraper in Manhattan, New York

Coordinates: 40.70511°N 74.00519°W

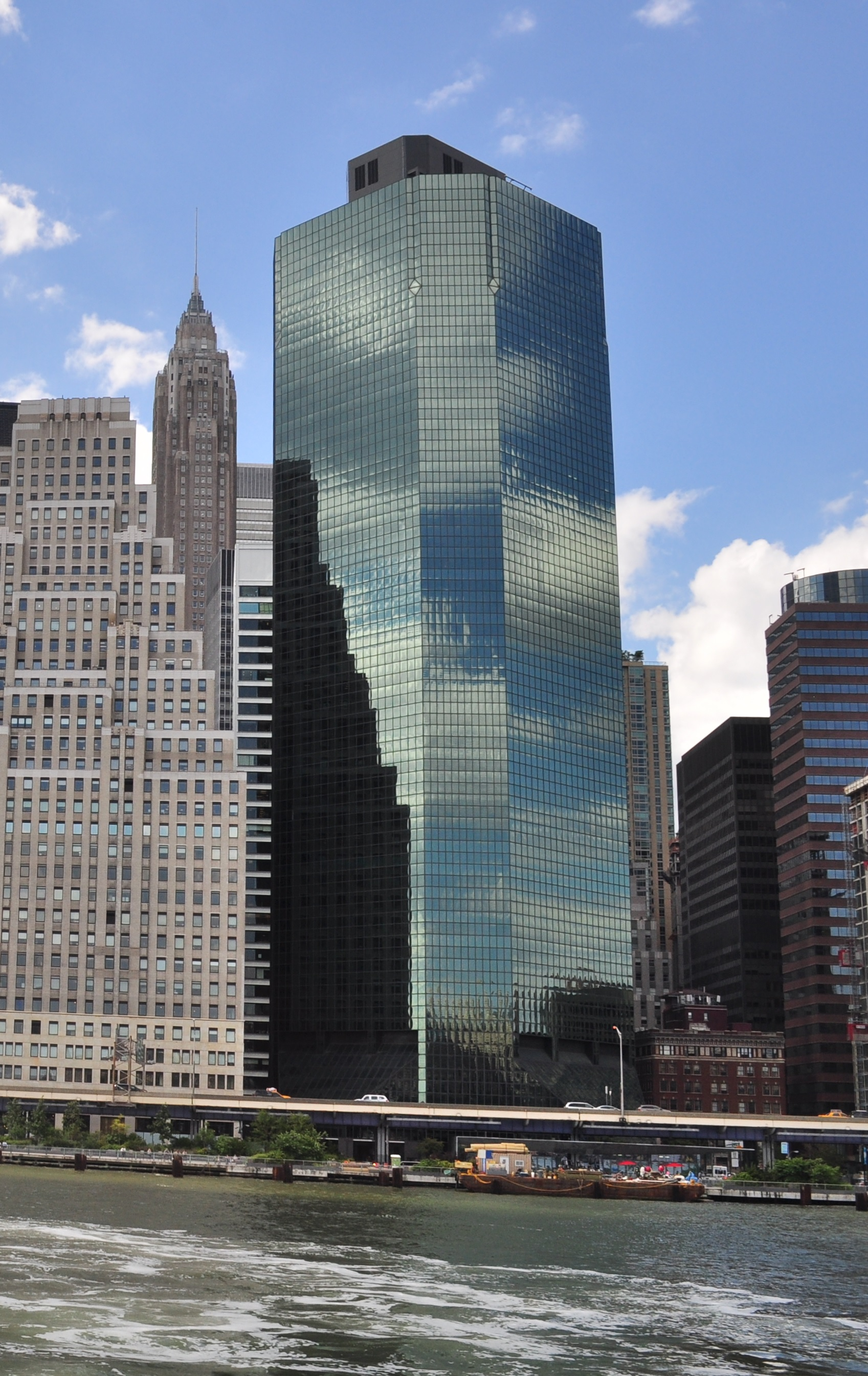
- Interactive map of the Continental Center area

General information
- Status: Completed
- Type: Office
- Location: New York City, New York, United States, 180 Maiden Lane
- Completed: 1983

Height
- Roof: 169 m (554 ft)

Technical details
- Floor count: 41
- Floor area: 1.092.537 sq ft (101.500 m²)

Design and construction
- Architect: Swanke Hayden Connell Architects
- Developer: Rockefeller Group

The Continental Center is an office skyscraper at 180 Maiden Lane in the Financial District of Manhattan, New York City. Built in 1983 and designed by Swanke Hayden Connell Architects, the building is 41 stories tall with a roof 554 feet (169 m) high.

== History ==
Originally designed for the CNA company, formerly Continental Insurance, which moved their office from 80 Maiden Lane, the building was formerly occupied by Cadwalader, Wickersham & Taft and Goldman Sachs. Ricker Auditorium, located on the mezzanine, is noted as the only perfectly square performing arts venue in Manhattan south of Pine Street. The octagonal plan of the building and the glass facade contrast with the neighboring high-rise skyscrapers, such as 120 Wall Street and One Chase Manhattan Plaza. In addition to offices, the building includes a cafeteria, an auditorium and classrooms for use by the occupants.

Moinian Group paid $355 million for the building in 2004. After Moinian had trouble paying off a loan, one of its lenders, SL Green, bought a 50% stake for $280 million in 2011. In 2015, Clarion Partners and MHP bought the building for $470 million from Moinian Group. The building was refinanced in 2020 with a $372 million loan. After the loan matured, and with Clarion and MHP unable to pay back the full loan, the owners agreed to a short sale in which the building would be sold for less than the loan's face value. 99c, an LLC associated with 161 Water Street, purchased the building in July 2024 for $297 million.
