= Fenty (surname) =

Fenty is a surname. Notable people with the surname include:

- Adrian Fenty (born 1970), American politician and mayor of Washington, D.C. (2007–2011)
- Andrew Fenty (born 2000), American tennis player
- John Fenty (born 1961), British politician, businessman and former football chairman
- Peter Fenty (born 1951), Canadian bishop in the Anglican Diocese of Toronto, Canada
- Renaldo Fenty (born 1977), Barbadian footballer
- Robyn Rihanna Fenty (born 1988), more commonly known as Rihanna, Barbadian singer, businesswoman and actress

== See also ==
- Fenty (disambiguation)
