= Fenty =

Fenty may refer to:

== Fashion brand ==
- Fenty (fashion house), Rihanna's brand under LVMH
- Fenty Beauty, Rihanna's cosmetics brand
- Fenty X Puma, fashion collaboration between Rihanna and German clothing manufacturer Puma
- Savage X Fenty, lingerie brand founded by Rihanna

== People ==
- Fenty (surname), a list of people with the surname

== Entertainment ==
- "Fenty", 2022 song by French Montana and NAV
- Savage X Fenty Show, American television special about the fashion show for Rihanna's lingerie brand Savage X Fenty

== Other ==
- Fentanyl, a highly potent synthetic piperidine opioid
- Forward Operating Base Fenty, a military base built around Jalalabad Airport, Afghanistan

== See also ==
- Fendi, a luxury brand under LVMH
