= Alton Mason =

American model and actor (born 1997)

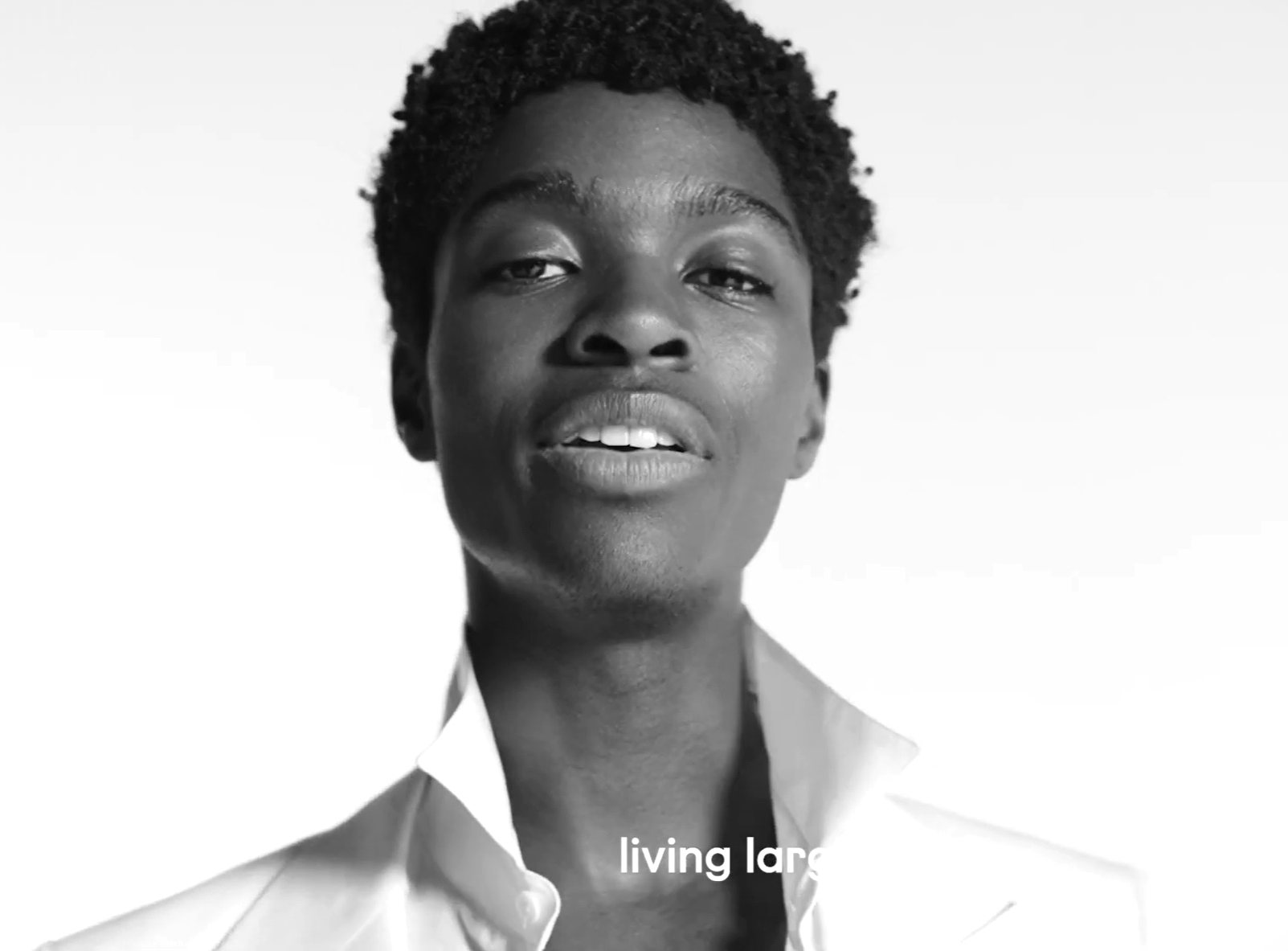
- Mason in an advertisement for Rabanne in 2019
- Born: Alton Devon Mason; November 21, 1997 (age 28); Nebraska, U.S.
- Education: American Musical and Dramatic Academy
- Occupations: Model; dancer; actor
- Years active: 2015–present
- Modeling information
- Height: 6 ft 2 in (1.88 m)
- Hair color: Black
- Eye color: Brown

Alton Devon Mason (/ˈæltən/ AL-tən; born November 21, 1997) is an American model, actor and dancer. He is one of the world's few male supermodels and the highest-paid one as of September 2023. GQ Australia named him male model of the year in 2019, Models.com gave him the same title for five consecutive years, and Forbes listed him in its 30 Under 30 2021 for Art & Style.

== Early life ==
Alton Mason was born in Nebraska in a family of Jamaican, Ghanaian and Haitian heritage. His father, Alton Mason Sr., is a former professional basketball player, and his mother, Anita Mason, is a former model from Gilbert, Arizona. He has three younger siblings – brother Alston and sisters Ania and Aniah. Due to his father's career, the family moved regularly, living in 11 European countries (including Greece, Belgium, Bosnia and the Netherlands) in a timespan of 13 years, until finally settling in Phoenix, Arizona. When he was 17, he moved away from Arizona to study dancing and acting at the American Musical and Dramatic Academy in Los Angeles, California.

== Career ==
Through his godmother, choreographer Laurieann Gibson, he was able to obtain a position as backup dancer for Diddy at the BET Awards 2015, which eventually led to being signed by a modeling agency. Mason was then discovered on Instagram and cast for Kanye West's Yeezy Season 3 show at Madison Square Garden. Two years later, he walked for the Gucci Fall 2017 show at the Milan Fashion Week. Chanel creative director Karl Lagerfeld chose him for a 2018 show, becoming the first black male model to walk for the brand. He also made appearances at the New York Fashion Week for Hugo Boss, and in a short film modeling clothes designed by Pharrell Williams for Chanel. He was part of the spring/summer campaign for Lacoste in 2019. Other brands Mason has modeled for include Versace, Puma, Fenty X Puma, Michael Kors, Philipp Plein, Jeremy Scott, Tom Ford, Valentino, Fendi, Karl Lagerfeld, Louis Vuitton, Off-White, Rabanne, Dolce & Gabbana, Balenciaga, Zara and H&M, as well as in advertising for BMW. He has cited Naomi Campbell as his biggest modeling inspiration. At the 2021 Met Gala, he wore Theophilio by Jamaican-American designer Edvin Thompson.

In 2020, he filmed a music video in Lagos, Nigeria for his first single "Gimme Gimme", as part of the soundtrack of Amarachi Nwosu and Soof Light's short film Rise in Light, in which he also starred. The video was used to publicize a fundraising in support of Nigerian communities, collecting more than $10,000 for the Aga Khan Foundation.

Mason portrayed Little Richard in Baz Luhrmann's 2022 biopic Elvis.
