= Fashion of Rihanna =

The fashion of Barbadian singer, songwriter, businesswoman, and actress Rihanna (born 1988) has impacted pop culture and set trends on fashion. She is known for her evolving style and has been described as a fashion icon by the media. Rihanna cited her mother as an early inspiration for her love of fashion, recalling how she admired watching her get dressed as a child. Her style has received numerous accolades, including the Style Icon Award at the CFDA Fashion Awards in 2014 and the Urban Luxe Award at the The Fashion Awards in 2019.

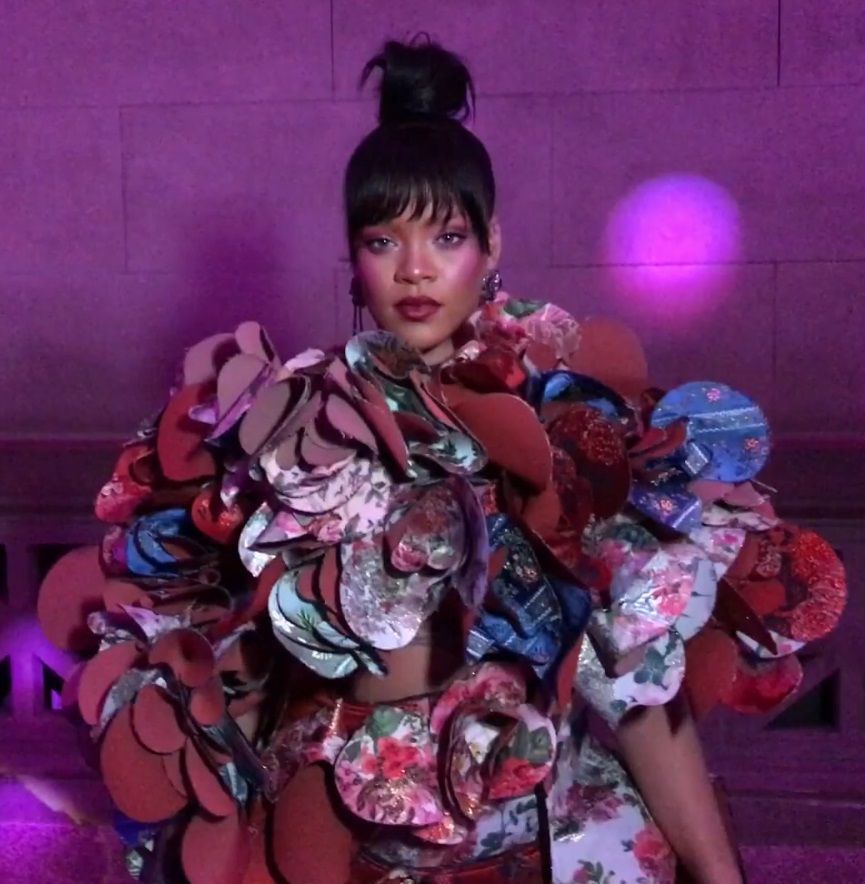
Rihanna at the Met Gala in 2017.

== 2000s fashion and style ==
Around the time of her second album A Girl like Me (2006), Rihanna’s fashion and image was often compared to Beyoncé. When asked about the comparisons, Rihanna told Look magazine that while she admired Beyoncé and felt honored to be compared to her, they were different performers with their own approaches.

By her third album Good Girl Gone Bad (2007) Rihanna abandoned her past innocent image in favor of a sharper, edgier style. She donned a bob haircut which was inspired by Charlize Theron's look in the film Æon Flux (2005). Her fashion transformation was noted by the media, with Nico Amarca of Highsnobiety later observing that Rihanna had undergone "one of the most significant aesthetic metamorphoses the world ha[d] ever seen". During the release of her fourth album Rated R (2009), Rihanna sported a partially shaved blonde pixie cut and hard-edged, rock-inspired outfits, adopting a less traditional approach to dressing at red carpet events.

== 2010s and 2020s fashion and style ==
With Loud (2010), Rihanna abandoned her hard-edged fashion sense for a softer, more feminine look; dying her hair red and wearing bright, pastel colors. With the release of Talk that Talk (2011), Rihanna’s fashion blended edgy "rock chic" streetwear and 90s inspired aesthetics.

During her pregnancy, Rihanna's maternity looks were praised for rejecting traditional maternity wear in favor of crop tops, sheer looks, and belly-baring designer pieces that exposed the singer's baby bump. Actress Anne Hathaway said Rihanna’s maternity looks inspired her own and credited Rihanna for “changing the game” of maternity fashion.
