= Band of Outsiders (clothing brand) =

London-based clothing label

Band of Outsiders is a London-based clothing label, founded in Los Angeles by Scott Sternberg in January 2004. The company went bankrupt in 2015, and its creditor, Belgian holding company CLCC SA, revived the label after it was unable to sell the intellectual property.

The brand was inspired by its founder's experience in film, it "targeted a niche market where fashion design, film school and “Wes Andersonian charm” would intersect" and was named after the French New Wave film Bande á Parte by Jean Luc Godard. The brand was known for a commitment to quality construction, which lead to the high prices that drove the company to bankruptcy, as customers were not willing to pay the brand's high retail prices for clothing that was stylistically analogous to clothing readily and cheaply available at other retailers.

== Menswear ==
Band of Outsiders started as a line of men's shirts and ties. Originally, all of Band of Outsider's button-downs were made in Los Angeles, and their suits were made in Brooklyn, New York at Martin Greenfield Clothiers. In 2009, Band of Outsiders introduced a line of polo shirts under the brand "This is not a Polo Shirt.", a play on René Magritte's painting "Ceci n'est pas une pipe." The collection developed into a full line of casual men's clothing, taking inspiration from heritage sports. Since 2016, the menswear brand has been based in London.

== Polaroid campaigns ==
Band of Outsiders is known for ad campaigns featuring polaroid photographs of celebrities including: Frank Ocean, Josh Brolin, Amy Adams, Michelle Williams, Ed Ruscha, Jason Schwartzman, Kirsten Dunst, Tom Felton, Rupert Grint, Elena Anaya, James Marsden, Donald Glover, Dave Franco, Leslie Mann, Franka Potente, Marisa Tomei, Bobby Birdman, Sarah Silverman, Max Minghella, Charles Hamilton, Paul Jasmin, John Dewis, and Matt Dallas. at Locations including: The Los Angeles County Museum of Art (LACMA), Sheats Goldstein Residence, the Sunset Ranch, Chinatown, the Autry National Center, the Los Angeles Times building, Hollywood Forever Cemetery, Huntington Library, Chateau Marmont, and Canter's.

== Fashion shows ==
Pitti Uomo

On June 15, 2011, Band of Outsiders debuted its Spring 2012 menswear collection and Resort 2012 womenswear collection at Pitti Uomo 80. The collection was inspired by the musicals West Side Story and Singin' in the Rain and was shown at Manifattura Tabacchi, an abandoned cigar factory in Florence, Italy. The Spring 12 Men's and Women's Resort collections were shown on runway models and professional dancers. The models walked and dancers danced to West Side Story's "America," choreographed by Fatima Robinson.

The Longest Show Ever

From June 27, 2012, through June 29, 2012, Band of Outsiders held the "Longest Show Ever", a 60-hour presentation to debut their spring 2013 collection in Paris, France. Model Brendan Ruck lived inside a compartment built from cardboard boxes and wood plants, adjacent to the window of a gallery. Visible through a window on the street, the presentation was also streamed live online through NowFashion. The model would leave the compartment every 90 minutes to change and be photographed in the next look from the collection. The live stream was viewed in over ninety countries across the world and had over 300,000 streams. The collection was inspired by "the idea of protest, and counterculture images from 1950s and ‘60s photographers such as Wallace Berman and Dennis Stock."

Matt (VS) Miles

On February 7, 2013, Band of Outsiders staged an interactive scavenger hunt across New York City. Models, Matt Hitt and Miles Garber, were given 10 clues that lead them to various destinations across the city. Hitt and Garber returned to Game Control, a roaming, transparent vehicle, after every clue was solved to change into the next of 20 looks from the Fall 2013 collection. The presentation was streamed live online and concluded with a celebratory party at the Monkey Bar inside Hotel Elysee, hosted by comedian Aziz Ansari. The collection was inspired by "notions of urban utopia, maps, globes and architect Oscar Niemeyer's Brasilia".

== Collaborations ==
In 2007, Band of Outsiders released a collection of knitwear under the heritage brand Glenmac and, in 2008, they collaborated with American boat shoe brand Sperry Top-Sider to create boat shoes using materials such as grosgrain, canvas, suede, sweatshirt, linen, nylon, corduroy, shearling, and fur. The shoes were part of the Band of Outsiders men's collection until Spring 2012. In 2009, Band of Outsiders collaborated with Spanish high-end shoe designer Manolo Blahnik, to create women's shoes for his runway shows and presentations. The collaboration included materials such as suspenders, shoelaces, metal and plastic watchbands and patent leather. In 2011, the brand released three polo shirts featuring 360-degree prints of iconic surf imagery by photographer Leroy Grannis. For the 2012 Summer Olympics, Band of Outsiders created limited edition tanks and tote bags inspired by the Games. They were sold exclusively at Opening Ceremony stores around the world and the 2013 womenswear collection featured prints inspired by a collaboration with Atari . Games such as Asteroids 7800, Warlords, Air-Sea Battle, Haunted House, and Combat were printed onto tops, skirts, dresses, pants, sweaters, and gowns. In 2013, Band Of Outsiders released a series of T-shirts featuring globe artwork by artist Sam Durant.

== Awards ==
- CFDA Menswear Designer of the year (Tie), 2010
- CFDA Swarovski Award for New Menswear Designer of the Year, 2009
- CFDA Vogue/Fashion Fund Nominee, 2008
