= David Montalba =

Swiss-American architect

- Born: 1972 (age 53–54); Florence, Italy
- Education: SCI-Arc (1996); University of California, Los Angeles (2000)
- Occupation: Architect
- Awards: 2008 AIA National Young Architect Award; 2012 ENR California Top 20 Under 40; 2012 Building Design + Construction 40 Under 40; 2016 AIA Fellowship
- Practice: Founding principal in Montalba Architects, Inc.

David Montalba, FAIA, SIA, LEED AP (born 1972 in Florence, Italy) is a Swiss-American architect based in Santa Monica, California. He is the founding principal of Montalba Architects, established in 2004.

== Early life and education ==
Montalba was born in Florence, Italy and raised in both Lausanne, Switzerland and Carmel and San Diego, California. He attended Southern California Institute of Architecture (SCI-Arc) where he earned his Bachelor of Architecture in 1996 and completed his Master of Architecture at UCLA in 2000.

== Career ==
Upon graduating from UCLA, he started his career with Fehlman Labarre Architects and has worked with design driven practices in Los Angeles including Frank Gehry, Rios Associates, and Pugh Scarpa, before establishing Santa Monica-based Montalba Architects, Inc. in 2004. He is also an adjunct professor at UCLA's Graduate School of Architecture.

He has served as a Board Member and Treasurer of the Los Angeles chapter of the American Institute of Architects and an advisor to the AIA's Academic Outreach and 2x8 Exhibition Committees. David has also served as a Board Member of the A+D Museum in Los Angeles and a registered member of NCARB.

== Awards and recognition ==
Montalba has received 30 awards from the notable American Institute of Architect (AIA) including the 2008 National Young Architect Award, Institute Honor Award in 2011 and 2019, 2013 AIA LA Presidential Honor Award for Building Team of the Year and in 2016, he was elevated to the College of the Fellows of the AIA. He was named one of the Top 20 Under 40 winners by ENR California in 2012 and listed as one of the 40 Under 40 architects by Building Design + Construction in 2012. In 2020, AN Interior named him one of the Top 50 Architects of the year.

== Selected projects ==
Hospitality

- SOHO House - Malibu, California
- Nobu Hotel Palo Alto - Palo Alto, California
- Whitepod, Zen Suite – Monthey, Switzerland
- Whitepod Suites-Chalets – Monthey, Switzerland
- Nobu Ryokan - Malibu, California
- Nobu Malibu - Malibu, California
- Equinox - Vancouver, British Columbia
- Equinox, Huntington Beach – Huntington Beach, California

Commercial

- Headspace SM Campus - Santa Monica, California
- Sony Music Headquarters – Beverly Hills, California
- Tom Bradley International Terminal – LA Airport - Los Angeles, California

Retail

- The Row Melrose – West Hollywood, California
- Monique Lhuillier – New York City, New York
- Carolina Herrera – Beverly Hills, California
- Gabriele Colangelo – Beijing, China
