= Rachel Scott (designer) =

Jamaican-American fashion designer (born 1984)

- Born: 1984 (age 41–42); Kingston, Jamaica
- Education: Colgate University; Istituto Marangoni
- Occupations: Fashion designer; businesswoman
- Years active: 2007–present
- Known for: Founder of Diotima; creative director of Proenza Schouler
- Awards: Finalist, LVMH Prize (2023); Emerging Designer of the Year, CFDA Fashion Awards (2023); Womenswear Designer of the Year, CFDA Fashion Awards (2024)
- Website: diotima.world

Rachel Scott (born 1984) is a Jamaican and American fashion designer, the founder of the womenswear label Diotima and the creative director of Proenza Schouler since 2025. A finalist for the 2023 LVMH Prize, she was named Emerging Designer of the Year by the Council of Fashion Designers of America (CFDA) in 2023 and Womenswear Designer of the Year in 2024, the first Black woman to win the latter award. Her appointment to Proenza Schouler made her the first Black woman named creative director of an established fashion house.

== Early life and education ==
Scott was born in 1984 in Kingston, Jamaica, where she spent her youth before leaving for college. Her mother worked as a flight attendant for Air Jamaica and also ran a clothing boutique called Gaychel, and Scott frequently joined her on flights. As a teenager, she made her own clothes, and has recounted climbing up mango trees and embroidering at the top. She attended Colgate University, where she studied French and art; the campus had been wracked by a racism scandal just before she began. During college, she took summer classes at Central Saint Martins and studied abroad in Dijon.

== Career ==
After college, an internship at Vogue dissuaded Scott from a career in magazines. She enrolled in a yearlong program at the Istituto Marangoni in Milan and worked briefly at Costume National, then left for London when her visa expired. Back in New York, she worked at J. Mendel and Elizabeth and James before joining Rachel Comey, where she stayed for seven years and rose to vice president of design.

In 2021, while still at Rachel Comey, Scott founded the womenswear label Diotima with her savings, naming it for the priestess in Plato's Symposium as read by the philosopher Herbert Marcuse in Eros and Civilization. All of the label's crochet is made in Jamaica, where Scott works with artisan groups including the Bonnygate Women's Group of Saint Mary, and tailoring is produced in New York's Garment District. Before its first runway show, Diotima presented its collections in lookbooks and presentations, collaborating with artists such as the Vincentian photographer Nadia Huggins for Pre-Fall 2022 and the Jamaican artist Laura Facey for Fall/Winter 2024, its first presentation.

The label found early admirers in the singer Ari Lennox and the actor Letitia Wright, and the artist Simone Leigh, an early enthusiast, recommended Scott's clothes to Thelma Golden, the director of the Studio Museum in Harlem. Ruth Negga, Greta Lee, and Tessa Thompson have worn Diotima on red carpets. In May 2025, James Frazier, a trustee of the Frazier Family Foundation, wore the label's first menswear look to the Met Gala.

=== Runway debut and Proenza Schouler ===
In early 2025, Scott was asked to consult for Proenza Schouler, whose founders Jack McCollough and Lazaro Hernandez had left for Loewe, and she developed the brand's spring 2026 collection with its in-house studio. On September 2, 2025, she was named the brand's creative director, and she continues to run Diotima alongside the role.

Her first runway show for Diotima, a spring 2026 collection inspired by Caribbean carnival, took place on September 15, 2025, in Greenpoint, Brooklyn. The show also introduced her first footwear line, including sneakers developed with Nike. Her debut runway collection for Proenza Schouler opened New York Fashion Week on February 11, 2026. Speaking to press backstage at the show, she wore an "ICE OUT" pin.

Diotima's fall 2026 collection, shown days later on February 15, was made in collaboration with the estate of the Cuban painter Wifredo Lam; Scott called it an explicitly political collection and described Lam's work as anti-imperialist. Women from Refugee Atelier, a New York organization supporting refugee women, contributed crochet to the collection. New York first lady Rama Duwaji sat front row at the show, and José Criales-Unzueta wrote in Vanity Fair that with the collection Scott had "stepped up as the American industry's backbone".

== Style ==
Scott's designs center on hand-worked crochet made in Jamaica, which she has described as closer to couture than beachwear, combined with draping and tailoring produced in New York. The crochet production is overseen by her mother in the Caribbean. She has described Diotima's spirit as "undone" and "rebellious", in contrast to the polish of Proenza Schouler, and has spoken of giving women "self-authorship" in how they dress. Reviewing the fall 2026 collection for Vogue, Nicole Phelps wrote that Scott employs Jamaican crochet artisans "the way French couture houses tout their petites mains". For campaign and lookbook imagery, Scott favors Jamaican landmarks such as the National Gallery of Jamaica over beach settings.

== Awards ==
In 2023, Diotima became the first Jamaican brand admitted to the LVMH Prize, and Scott was one of its nine finalists that year. Also in 2023, she was named Emerging Designer of the Year at the CFDA Fashion Awards and was a runner-up for the CFDA/Vogue Fashion Fund. In 2024, she won the CFDA's Womenswear Designer of the Year award, the first Black woman to receive it. Both CFDA wins came before she had ever staged a runway show. The same year, she accepted the inaugural Empowered Vision Award from the CFDA and the Frazier Family Foundation. In 2025, she won the Fashion Trust U.S. award for ready-to-wear, was a finalist for the Woolmark Prize, and was a nominee for the Latin American Fashion Awards. Also in 2025, Time named her to its Closers list. Scott is a member of the Council of Fashion Designers of America.

== Personal life ==
Scott married Chaday Emmanuel Scott, a Jamaican activist for transgender rights, in 2024, and they live in Bedford–Stuyvesant, Brooklyn. She became an American citizen in 2020. She has Charcot–Marie–Tooth disease.
