= Robert Geller =

German-born American fashion designer (born 1976)

- Born: 1976 (age 49–50); Hamburg, Germany
- Education: Rhode Island School of Design
- Occupation: Fashion designer
- Spouse: Ana Beatriz Lerario
- Website: robertgeller-ny.com

Robert Geller (born 1976, in Hamburg, Germany) is a German-born American fashion designer.

== Early life and education ==
He graduated with a degree in fashion design at RISD in 2001 and moved to New York to join Marc Jacobs shortly after.

== Career ==
In New York, Geller met Alexandre Plokhov, a patternmaker, and partnered up with him at menswear brand Cloak, which went on to win the Ecco Domani award in 2003 and the Vogue/CFDA Grant in 2004. Geller left Cloak after the Fall 2004 collection. Cloak finally closed down in Spring 2007.

In 2006, Geller launched a women's line called Harald. Initially meant to only be knitwear, the line grew into a full collection. This helped Geller secure financial backing for a menswear label under his own name. In Fall 2007 Robert Geller menswear debuted at New York Fashion Week.

In 2024, Geller became lead designer of men's clothing at fashion company Rag & Bone.

== Awards and honors ==
Geller received the GQ Best New Menswear Designer Award in 2009. Geller was a finalist for the 2010 CFDA / Vogue Fashion Fund prize, and won CFDA Swarovski Award for Menswear in 2011.

== Personal life ==
He is married to fashion designer Ana Beatriz Lerario, designer of Lerario Beatriz. The couple met while working together at Marc Jacobs.
