= Ana Khouri =

Jewellery designer (born 1981)

- Born: Ana Khouri; March 5, 1981 (age 44)
- Occupation: Jewellery designer
- Website: anakhouri.com

Ana Khouri (born March 5, 1981) is a New York-based jewelry designer.

Khouri works with gemstones, 18K gold, or platinum. Her range includes ear cuffs. Rather than release of seasonal collections, Khouri focuses on limited editions.

== Early life and education ==
Ana Khouri was born in 1981 in São Paulo, Brazil and grew up in Londrina. Her father is an engineer.

She studied sculpture at art school and holds a degree in Fine Arts at FAAP. Khouri studied gemology at the Gemological Institute of America and also studied at the Parsons School of Design in New York. Additionally, Khouri completed a course in jewelry design from London's Central Saint Martins, and has studied under Hermès.

== Career ==
Khouri has been sculpting and working on individual special projects since 2002.

She moved to New York in 2012.

Her namesake collection was launched in the US in 2013.

As of 2014, Ana Khouri presents installations once a year during Paris Haute Couture at the Musée des Arts Décoratifs. These presentations center on a single concept that informs the designs, displays, and settings of the collection.

She held her first solo exhibition at Phillips Auction House, New York, in September 2018. It was a four-day exhibition followed by Khouri's second four-day exhibition at the London-based Phillips Auction House in September 2019, showcasing the artist's jewelry and sculptural works.

In 2019, Khouri held a jewelry exhibition at the Musée des Arts Décoratifs, Paris.

Khouri is a member of CFDA and the second contemporary jeweler to garner distinction at Phillips.

=== Collaborations ===
Khouri has worked in collaboration with fashion designer Narciso Rodriguez, contributing pieces to complement his Spring/Summer '16 collection and again for Fall/Winter '16. Ana partnered with Dover Street Market in New York for the release of her 2015 and 2016 pieces, and again in 2017 for the release of her first Haute Joaillerie installation in London. In 2016, the designer launched a bridal collection with Barneys New York. In 2018, Khouri was hosted by Phillips for a selling exhibition titled Jewels Now dedicated to the work of the visionary jewelry designer. The subsequent year, in 2019, Phillips London headed "Ana Khouri: Jewels as Art," the first show of its kind held in London, which showcased the full retrospective of the designer's work. In 2019, Ana Khouri introduced a special collaboration with The Row, the only contemporary jewelry designer carried there.

=== Philanthropy ===
Spearheaded by Khouri in 2014, Projeto Ovo is a Brazilian non-profit that donates 100% of all sales proceeds to 75 NGOs.

During the COVID-19 pandemic, Khouri created several pieces, including a sapphire ring and a pair of diamond earrings, and donated 100% of their proceeds to Doctors Without Borders and the CFDA Vogue Fashion Fund, respectively.

Khouri has pledged donations to Black Lives Matter, Hetrick-Martin Institute, and Campaign Zero.

=== Media attention ===
Her V-shaped gold Wave Tiara gained her international attention when it became a favorite of Madonna. Later, Jennifer Lawrence wore Khouri's ear cuffs to the premiere of Hunger Games: Catching Fire.

== Awards and recognitions ==
Khouri is the winner of the 2017 ANDAM Accessory Award.

In 2019, she was nominated for the jewelry Design category at the GEM Awards 2020.
