= Edvin Thompson =

Jamaican-American fashion designer

- Born: Kingston, Jamaica
- Label: Theophilio
- Awards: American Emerging Designer of the Year, CFDA Fashion Awards (2021)
- Website: theophilio.com

Edvin Thompson is a Jamaican-American fashion designer. He founded the Brooklyn-based label Theophilio in 2016, and in 2021 he won the American Emerging Designer of the Year award at the CFDA Fashion Awards.

Thompson's work draws on his Jamaican heritage and on the years he has lived in the United States. Theophilio made its runway debut at New York Fashion Week in September 2021, and in 2025 a piece from the label was included in "Superfine: Tailoring Black Style", the Costume Institute exhibition at the Metropolitan Museum of Art.

== Early life ==
Thompson was born in Kingston, Jamaica, and moved to the United States in 2002, at the age of nine. He was largely raised in New Jersey. In high school, he and a group of friends who called themselves the Cool Kids Crew came up with themed outfits to wear each week; he has said that "fashion was a tool I used to have conversations". Thompson, who is openly gay, saw fashion as a way to convey his immigrant experience and to express himself. In the summer of 2013, he and friends from Atlanta made a road trip to Brooklyn's Afropunk Festival, an experience he has said spearheaded his interest in Black fashion.

Thompson lived in Atlanta from 2010 to 2014, where he gained sewing experience with the help of mentors Mya Moto and Wynter Alex, co-owners of the vintage boutique Poor Little Rich Girl. He moved to Brooklyn in 2014; his plan to attend the Fashion Institute of Technology did not pan out, and a community of creative friends pushed him to start his own label.

== Career ==
Thompson founded Theophilio in 2016, and named the label after his middle name, which means "to be loved by God". With little money at the start, he taught himself to sew through free classes in his neighborhood and staged early shows in rented Brooklyn garages. Over the next four years the label picked up magazine covers and the attention of figures such as Solange, and by 2020 Theophilio had a spot on the CFDA's official New York Fashion Week calendar. That year, Teen Vogue selected Thompson for its Generation Next class of designers; the collection he presented, "Migration", came with a short film of the Jamaican coastline recorded from his family's car after the funerals of his grandmother and great-grandmother. He also joined Black Fashion Fair, the platform founded by Antoine Gregory to support Black designers, and in June 2021 the pair released the "Family Portrait Series", T-shirts printed with family photographs, marked by a Juneteenth pop-up shop in Sunset Park, Brooklyn.

The label's Fall/Winter 2021 collection, its first designed for winter, took inspiration from The Matrix and introduced the "Banana Boat" handbag, a nod to the bags Thompson's mother, grandmother, and aunt carried in Jamaica. On September 11, 2021, Theophilio made its runway debut at New York Fashion Week with "Air Jamaica", a Spring 2022 collection named for the defunct national airline; the invitation was a makeshift plane ticket, and an Air Jamaica flight had been the first Thompson took when he immigrated to the United States in 2002. Days later, he attended his first Met Gala as a guest of Lewis Hamilton, who bought a table to support up-and-coming Black designers; sprinter Sha'Carri Richardson wore a custom red and black Theophilio gown, and model Alton Mason was also dressed in the label. On November 10, 2021, at the CFDA Fashion Awards held at The Pool in the Seagram Building, Thompson won American Emerging Designer of the Year, and HoYeon Jung presented the award. He was also a finalist for the 2021 CFDA/Vogue Fashion Fund.

In 2022, Thompson created a look with Black Fashion Fair and the estate of Jean-Michel Basquiat for the King Pleasure exhibition, and the label's clothes appeared on the Gossip Girl reboot. On September 14, 2022, the label showed its Spring 2023 collection, "Homecoming", which Thompson called "an ode to all the places I called home"; styled by i-D fashion director Carlos Nazario, it featured beaded headdresses with cowrie shells that nodded to Jamaica's Carnival scene, and crystallized remakes of the "I Love NY" T-shirt. In October 2022, Theophilio released an eight-piece capsule with Luxury Stores at Amazon, promoted with a campaign Philip-Daniel Ducasse photographed in Jamaica.

After skipping the Fall 2023 season, Thompson presented his Spring 2024 collection in September 2023, and told Vogue he had spent the year "taking the time to make sure the foundation is strong". That month, Naomi Campbell chose him as one of two designers to work with her on her PrettyLittleThing collection, and he had recently made custom looks for Victoria Monét, Asake, and Ice Spice. He returned to the runway in September 2024 with Spring 2025, titled "Shaunie" after a childhood nickname from his mother's side of the family. The Fall 2025 collection, the label's first fall lineup since 2021, was shown by appointment in February 2025. A pair of bright green sequined men's trousers from Spring 2025 was included in "Superfine: Tailoring Black Style", the Costume Institute's 2025 exhibition at the Metropolitan Museum of Art. For Spring 2026, shown in September 2025, Thompson presented "Riddim" in partnership with Volkswagen, and models walked out from a wrapped Volkswagen ID. Buzz.

== Design approach ==
i-D's Scarlett Newman has described the Theophilio universe as "a sartorial autobiography", and Thompson has said his designs are inspired by "Jamaica's past and future". The colors of the Jamaican and Rastafarian flags recur across the label's work, most visibly on the "Freedom Rasta Tank Dress", a sheer mesh style that became one of its most recognizable pieces. Reviewing the "Air Jamaica" show for Vogue, Emily Farra wrote that while the references were Jamaican, the silhouettes were "quintessentially New York: stretchy, body-skimming, and confidence-raising". José Criales-Unzueta, reviewing the Spring 2026 show for the same magazine, gave Thompson credit for "an expansive perspective on what a sexy body is", one that included muscular, slim, trans, and plus-size bodies.
