= Lela Rose =

American fashion designer

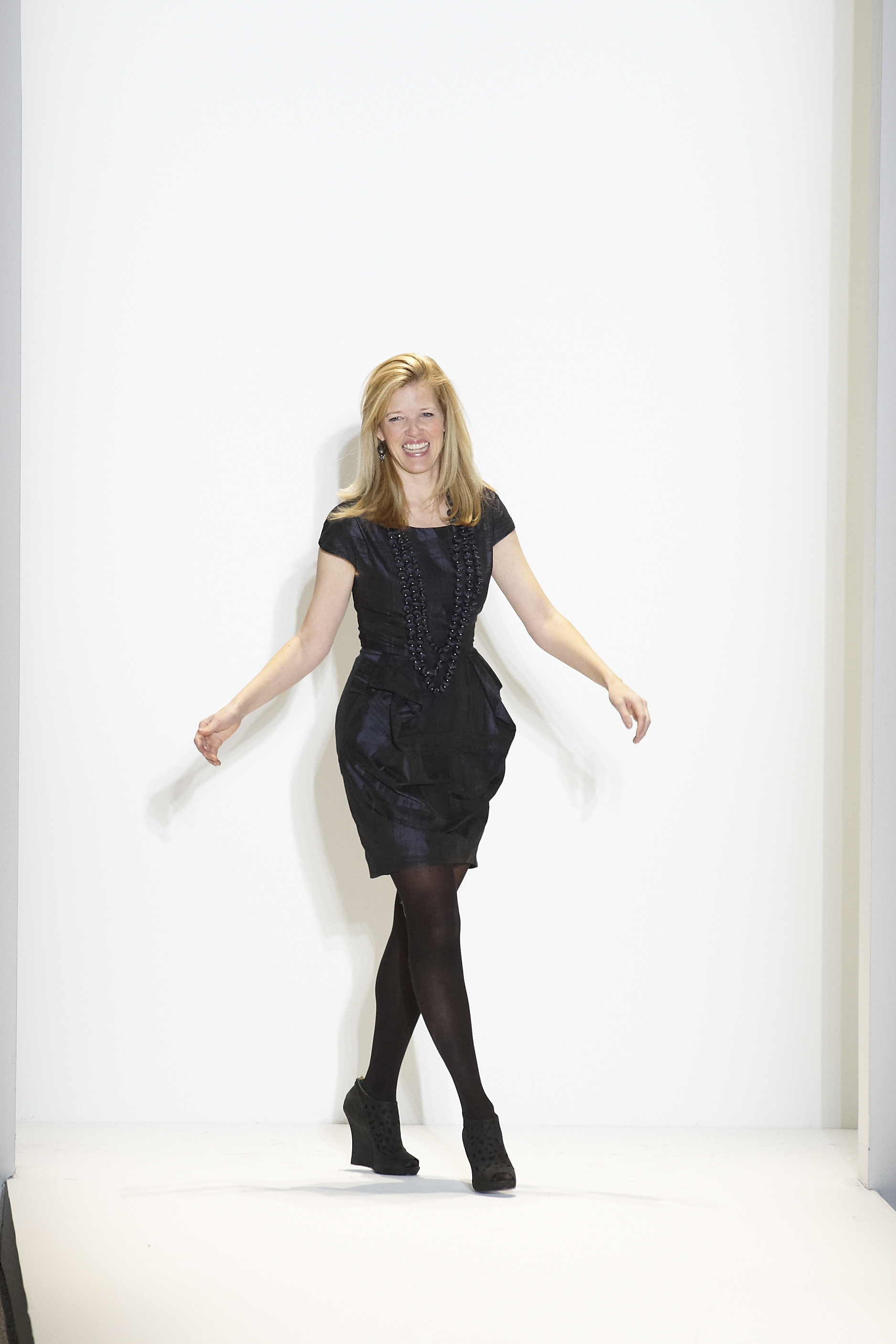
Rose in 2010

Lela Rose is an American fashion designer.

Lela grew up in Dallas, Texas. She attended the University of Colorado Boulder where she was a painting and sculpture major and graduated in 1991. She had a business in college making vests from vintage scarves and decided to go into fashion. She moved to New York City and headed to Parsons School of Design which she graduated from in 1993 with an associate degree. She worked under Christian Francis Roth, a fashion designer, and Richard Tyler, a designer based in Los Angeles. She then launched her collection in 1996 out of her own apartment, which featured feminine clothing with many embellishments.

In 2001 she garnered attention when she designed the outfits worn by Jenna and Barbara Bush at their father's presidential inauguration. Until that point, she was mainly working with private clients. After that, she began to expand her business with retail businesses like Bergdorf Goodman and Neiman Marcus.

Some of her well-known clientele include Jessica Alba, Molly Sims, Mindy Kaling, Ashley Judd, Mariska Hargitay, Mary-Kate Olsen, Ashley Olsen, Selma Blair and the Princess of Wales.

In fall 2006, Rose debuted her first bridal collection. Following the success of the bridal collection, Rose partnered with The Dessy Group for an exclusive bridesmaid line.

== Personal life ==
Rose lives in New York City. She has a son - Grey and a daughter - Rosey Potter Jones born in 2006.
