= Superfine: Tailoring Black Style =

Fashion exhibition at Metropolitan Museum of Art

Superfine: Tailoring Black Style, or the 2025 Met Gala, is the 2025 high fashion art exhibition of the Anna Wintour Costume Center, a wing of the Metropolitan Museum of Art (MMA) which houses the collection of the Costume Institute. The exhibition was announced on October 9, 2024. The exhibition featured a pair of bright green sequined men's trousers by Edvin Thompson for his label Theophilio.
