= Mayfair House, London =

1920s building in London, England

Coordinates: 51.5105°N 0.1499°W

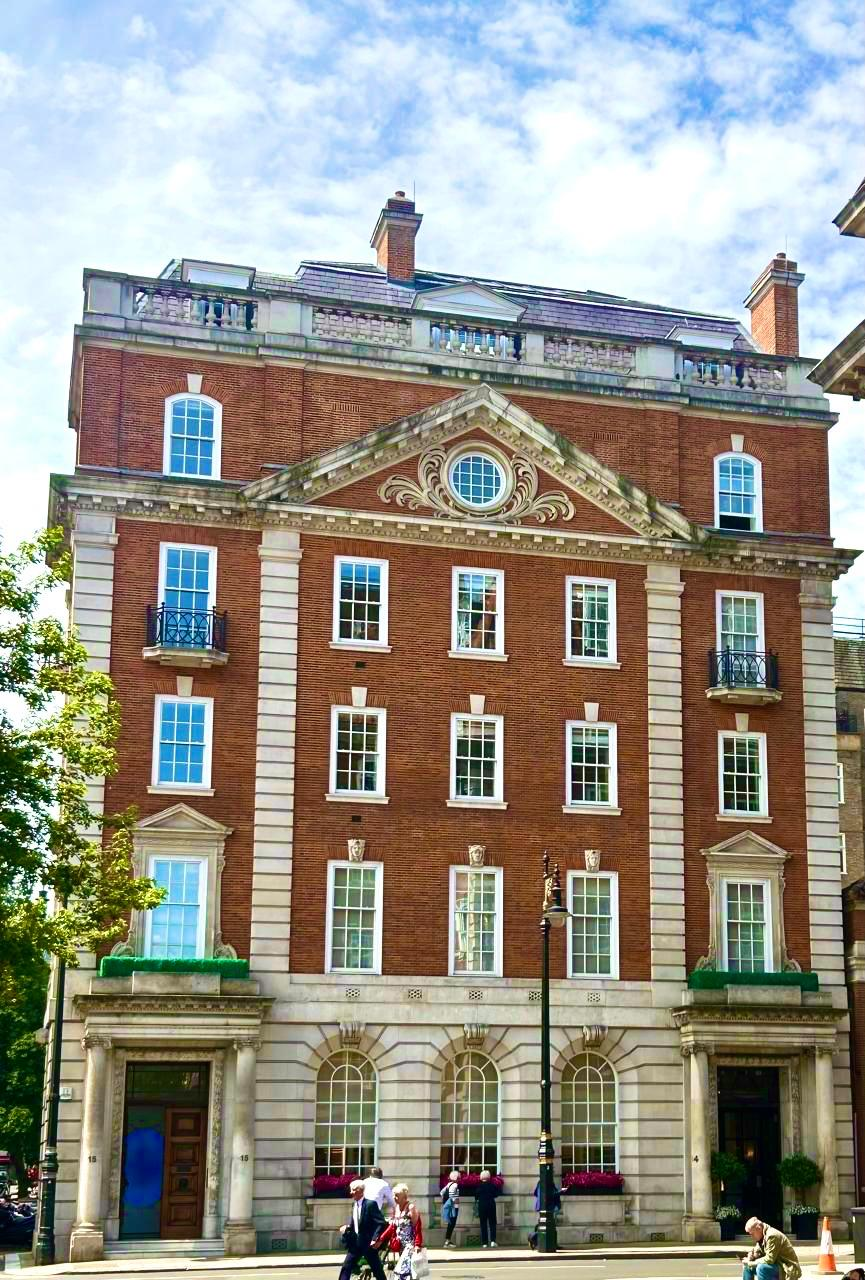
Mayfair House

Mayfair House is a property at 14 and 15 Carlos Place, Mayfair. It was built in 1920-21 by the Holloway Brothers and designed by Edmund Wimperis and Simpson in a neo-Georgian style.

== History ==
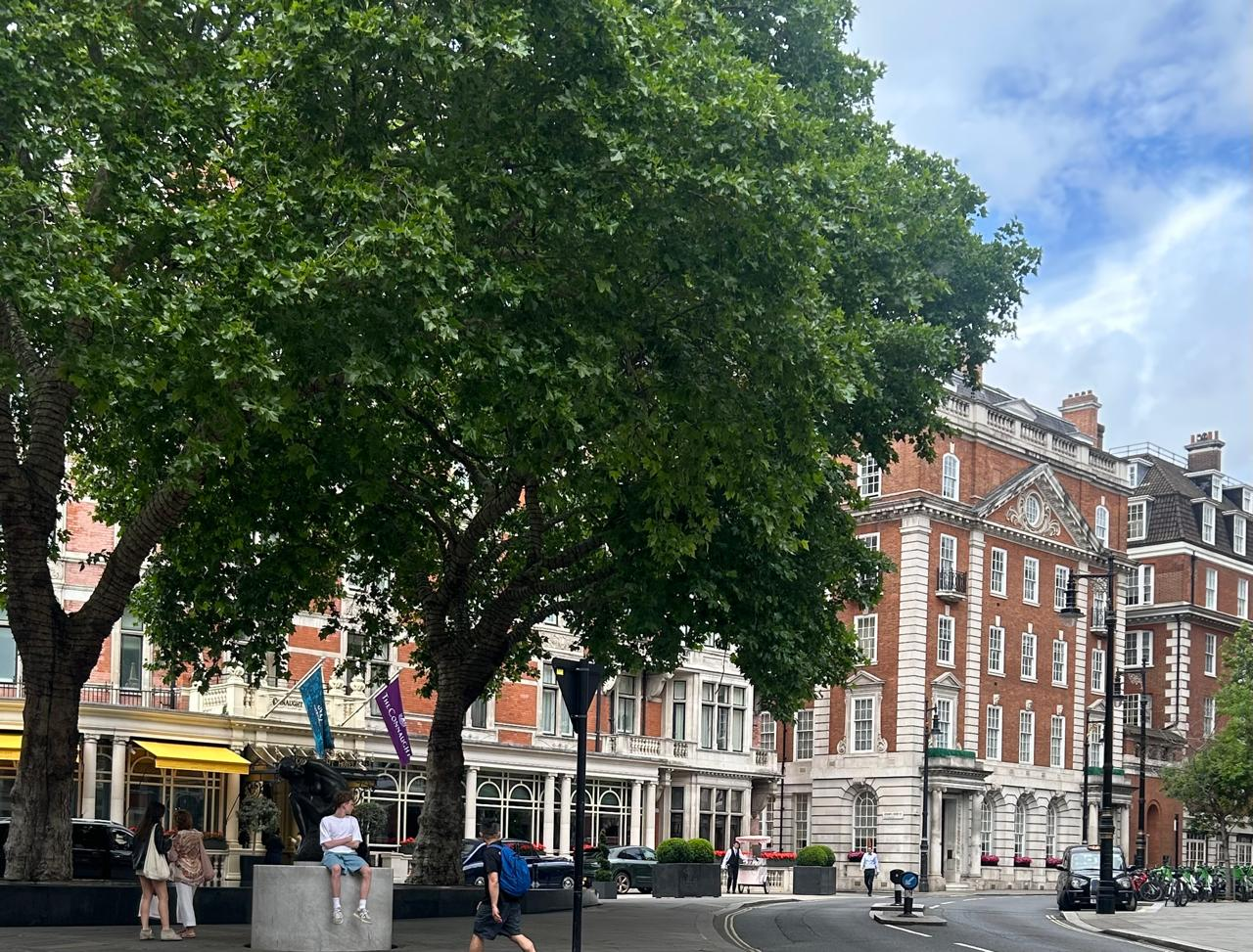
Mayfair House and the Connaught Hotel

The house was designed by Edmund Wimperis in 1912 as part of a project to redesign the adjacent Grosvenor Square and add two new properties onto Carlos Place. It featured carvings by Gilbert Seale and Sons.

In 1931 the Duke of Westminster sold the property's freehold Westminster Bank Limited for £11,000. This means it is a freehold outside of the Grosvenor Estate which owns numerous nearby properties.

In 2007, Eric Parry redeveloped the property for Lady Helen Taylor for their new Timothy Taylor Art Gallery. The building was extended at the rear and an extra floor and roof garden were added. Byrne Brothers carried out the building works designed by Derek Williams. The interiors were refurbished and fitted by Williams and Finchatton. The scheme was the recipient of five CEDIA awards in 2018.

In 2019 Annabelle Selldorf architects refurbished and redesigned 15 Carlos Place for Mary-Kate and Ashley Olsen's fashion label The Row.

In the 21st century No. 14 was redesigned by Derek Williams. and no. 15 by Eric Parry and Annabelle Selldorf.
