= Roger Forsythe =

American fashion designer

Roger Forsythe (born John Roger Forsythe; July 11, 1955 – October 6, 1991) was a men's fashion designer.

== Biography ==
Forsythe was born in Chillicothe, Missouri, on July 11, 1955, and raised in Texas.

Forsythe earned a business degree from the University of Houston and then attended the Fashion Institute of Technology in New York City, where he graduated with an associate degree in applied sciences, specializing in men's wear, in 1982.

Forsythe trademarked his name on July 23, 1984. and began his career working for Jean Paul Germaine, Kenneth Gordon and later was director of men's, women's and children's sportswear collections at Basic Elements, Los Angeles CA.

In 1988 he was appointed as Director Of Design, Men's Wear division for the Perry Ellis Group. Under Forsythe's direction, sales under his leadership jumped from $15 million to more than $100 million annually.

Founder Perry Ellis died of complications from AIDS in 1986. Forsythe proved to be the design force that put the men's collection back on its feet following Ellis' death.

Forsythe was awarded Men's Wear Designer of the Year by the Council of Fashion Designers of America (CFDA) in 1991.

He died on October 6, 1991, at the New York University Medical Center of HIV- related lymphatic cancer.
