= Jorge Pardo =

Jorge Pardo may refer to:

- Jorge Pardo (artist), Cuban-American artist and sculptor
- Jorge Pardo (musician) (born 1955), Spanish musician
- J. D. Pardo (born 1980), American film and television actor
