= Nonnie Moore =

American fashion editor

Nonnie Moore (born Marjorie Eilers; January 21, 1922 – February 19, 2009) was a fashion editor at Mademoiselle, Harper's Bazaar and GQ.

== Biography ==
She was born in Plainfield, New Jersey as Marjorie Eilers on January 21, 1922, and acquired the nickname "Nonnie" during her childhood. She was a graduate of Barnard College.

Her first job was at Mademoiselle in 1950 as a secretary, rising through the ranks to become fashion editor there from 1970 to 1980. She was hired by Harper's Bazaar in 1980 and remained there until 1984. The New York Times noticed the changes she made at Harper's Bazaar, highlighting how the magazine how been "looking a little dowdy", but that Moore had "noticeably sharpened the magazine's fashion point of view" by showing "brighter, younger and more stylish", complimenting her use of "young and exciting fashion photographers" such as Oliviero Toscani.

Moore was hired by GQ magazine as its fashion editor in 1984. Jim Moore, the magazine's fashion director at the time of her death described the choice as unusual, observing that "She was not from men's wear, so people said she was an odd choice, but she was actually the perfect choice" and noting that she changed the publication's more casual look, which "She helped dress up the pages, as well as dress up the men, while making the mix more exciting and varied and approachable for men." Traveling to Paris and elsewhere around the world, Moore had a knack for finding designers who had something new to offer, including Perry Ellis and Issey Miyake, whom she publicized early in their careers. Wendy Goodman of New York magazine described how "Nonnie was quick to pick up how important Miyake was before most people really understood his work", identifying and championing the work of Miyake and other rising designers.

The Council of Fashion Designers of America recognized Moore with a lifetime achievement award in 1994, the year she retired.

== Death and legacy ==
A resident of Manhattan, Moore died at Saint Vincent's Catholic Medical Center at age 87, on February 19, 2009, due to a choking accident. She was survived by two sons, two grandchildren and a sister. Her husband Thomas L. Moore died in 1990; the couple had been married for 38 years.

Samuel Irving Newhouse, Jr., chairman of Condé Nast Publications, the owner of GQ recalled that "Nonnie was a brilliant fashion editor and always added something special to the stories she covered for GQ".
