= Tim Hamilton (designer) =

American fashion designer

- Born: (United States) Iowa
- Labels: Tim Hamilton Collection; Tim Hamilton Redux
- Awards: CFDA Swarovski Award for Menswear Designer of the Year, 2009
- Website: timhamilton.com

Tim Hamilton is an American fashion designer known for minimalist sportswear. He launched his own menswear label in 2006. He is a three time CFDA nominee, and the winner of the 2009 CFDA/Swarovski Award for Menswear.

== Early life and education ==
After receiving his undergraduate degree in liberal arts from University of Iowa, Hamilton moved to New York to begin his career in fashion. He continued his studies at Parsons and began to work for American brands including Polo Ralph Lauren and J.Crew.

== Career ==
In 2007, with his background in American craftsmanship, he drew influence from his upbringing in Iowa, global travels and interest in art to found his own eponymous label which is sold to prestigious global stores including Barneys New York, Bergdorf Goodman (New York), Isetan (Japan) and L’Eclaireur (Paris). He sought to fill a void in American minimalist fashion. He fused his interests to create a brand that embodies a modern sportswear look, influenced by streetwear, with abstract elements and close attention to detail. In addition to Tim Hamilton Collection, he introduced Tim Hamilton Redux, a greatest hits collection of minimalist basics. In 2009 he brought these influences together to design his first women’s collection.

Since the brand’s inception, Hamilton has gone on to win the CFDA award for emerging menswear designer, and to be the first American to show at the Chambre Syndicale in Paris.

Hamilton was one of the earliest independent designers to collaborate with fast fashion retailers such as Uniqlo and Topshop. His fascination with contemporary art is nurtured by ongoing collaborations with artists like photographer Collier Schorr, painter Ross Bleckner and a continuing partnership with the multi-disciplinary Seth Price.
