= Scott Sternberg (designer) =

American fashion designer

- Born: Dayton, Ohio
- Education: Washington University in St. Louis
- Occupations: American Fashion Designer; Photographer; Entrepreneur
- Website: https://www.dymaxionfutures.com

Scott Sternberg is an American fashion designer, photographer and entrepreneur based in Los Angeles, California. Scott Sternberg was born and raised in Dayton, Ohio. He was the founder, Chairman, and Creative Director of the cult fashion brands Band of Outsiders and Entireworld, menswear and womenswear brands based in Los Angeles, CA.

== Education ==
Sternberg attended Washington University in St. Louis, where he received a Bachelor of Science in Economics, Summa Cum Laude, Phi Beta Kappa, in 1997. He also studied photography.

== Early career ==
Sternberg began his career in the film business in late 1997, working as an assistant in the motion picture talent department at Creative Artists Agency, where he eventually in 1999 became an agent in the company’s New Media and Marketing Division.

In 2003, Sternberg left CAA to work with Tom Scott (co-founder and former co-CEO of Nantucket Nectars), Cary Woods (film producer), and Emily Scott (founder and former CEO of J.Crew) on a new consulting and media venture. His brief time working there, specifically with Emily Scott, piqued a long held interest in fashion, which led Sternberg to start Band of Outsiders later that year.

== Band of Outsiders ==
Sternberg started Band of Outsiders in late 2003 as a line of men’s shirts and ties, which eventually grew to include womenswear and accessories. The brand sold in 225 doors worldwide, including Barneys New York, Bergdorf Goodman, Saks Fifth Avenue, United Arrows, Beams, and Colette. The line had been described as "recontextualized vintage-inspired looks with hand-sewn seams and shrunken proportions" that "look[s] toward the future by revisiting the past, wistfully but also with a mischievous, ironic wink." As for Sternberg's contribution, Business of Fashion once described it as follows: “So crystalline is Sternberg’s vision and his business acumen, one imagines that if he were to design a car or a building, not only would he likely pull it off, but it would be immediately recognizable as an entity in the Band brand.” Over the course of 11 years, Band of Outsiders collaborated with brands such as Sperry Top-Sider, Starbucks, Lego, Atari, and Target. On June 15, 2015, Sternberg announced he is leaving the brand via Instagram and that he cannot comment on the future of the brand as it is out of his hands, leaving "many people outside and inside the industry were shocked by the news."

== Entireworld ==
On March 27, 2018, Sternberg announced his new company Entireworld.

During the early stages of the COVID-19 pandemic of 2020, Entireworld’s sales increased over 600% month-over-month from the previous year due to increased interest in the brand's sweatsuits and ultra-comfortable loungewear. The brand’s momentum that year culminated in the New York Times Magazine Cover Story “Sweatpants Forever: How the Fashion Industry Collapsed” which prominently featured Sternberg’s business experience at both Entireworld and Band of Outsiders.

Despite the success and growth during that period of 2020-2021, on October 13, 2021, "[Sternberg] announced on Instagram that Entireworld was closing. He had been trying to find a buyer or investors for months, and now the anticipated deal, he wrote, 'disappeared in a flash.'"

== Photography ==
Sternberg has served as the photographer for all of the Band of Outsider’s Polaroid campaign shoots since 2005. The campaigns have been described as "inviting, playful (right up to the point of precious), and in some cases — Marisa Tomei’s comes to mind — very sexy." Campaign subjects have included: Frank Ocean, Josh Brolin, Amy Adams, Michelle Williams, Ed Ruscha, Jason Schwartzman, Kirsten Dunst, Tom Felton, Rupert Grint, Elena Anaya, James Marsden, Donald Glover, Dave Franco, Leslie Mann, Franka Potente, Marisa Tomei, Bobby Birdman, Sarah Silverman, Max Minghella, Charles Hamilton, Paul Jasmin, John Dewis, and Matt Dallas.

== Film and video ==
Sternberg served as the director and videographer on the Entireworld advertising social media campaigns, which have been described as “cinematic adorable” and “bizarre”.

The campaigns featured actors, musicians, and dancers, including Andrew Garfield, Kirsten Dunst, Maya Rudolph, Moses Sumney, Selma Blair, Max Minghella, Lizzy Caplan, Juno Temple, Sameer Zamata, Adam Scott, Heidi Gardner, Hasan Minajh, Jason Schwartzman, Katherine Waterston, St. Beauty, Ronny Chieng, Miranda July, Busy Philipps, Max Greenberg, artist Ed Ruscha, and the Jacob Jonas Dance Company.

== Awards ==
- CFDA Menswear Designer of the Year (Tie), 2010
- CFDA Swarovski Award for New Menswear Designer of the Year, 2009
- CFDA Vogue/Fashion Fund Nominee, 2008
