= Proenza Schouler =

Womenswear and accessories brand

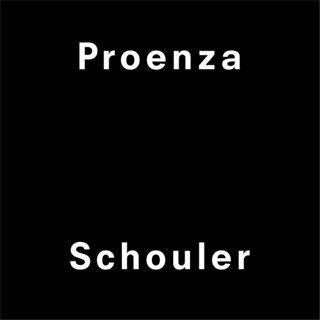
- Type: Private
- Industry: Fashion
- Founded: 2002; 24 years ago
- Founders: Jack McCollough; Lazaro Hernandez
- Headquarters: New York City, New York, U.S.
- Key people: Rachel Scott (Creative Director), Jack McCollough (Co-Founder, former Designer), Lazaro Hernandez (Co-Founder, former Designer)
- Products: Women's wear, handbags
- Website: www.proenzaschouler.com

Proenza Schouler /proʊˌɛnzə ˈskuːlər/ is a womenswear and accessories brand founded in New York City in 2002 by designers Jack McCollough and Lazaro Hernandez.

In January 2025 Proenza Schouler announced that McCollough and Hernandez would cease designing for the company but would remain on the board and continue to be minority shareholders; they went to design for Loewe.

== Etymology ==
"Proenza Schouler" is the maiden names of the two designers' mothers: Proenza is the maiden name of Hernandez's mother, and Schouler is the maiden name of McCollough's mother.

== History ==
=== Jack McCollough and Lazaro Hernandez, 2002–2025 ===
McCollough and Hernandez met while studying at Parsons School of Design, collaborating on their senior thesis, which would eventually become their first collection as Proenza Schouler. The collection was bought in its entirety by Barneys New York.

In 2008, Proenza Schouler introduced its first shoe collection, licensed through Giuseppe Zanotti, Vicini SpA. Later that year, Proenza Schouler launched its first handbag, the PS1, a satchel that has become the brand's signature. In 2012, Proenza Schouler signed a new license agreement with Onward Luxury Group to produce their footwear collections. The brand expanded into swimwear in 2014 when they signed a licensing agreement with Swimwear Anywhere to produce and distribute swimwear. In June 2015, Proenza Schouler signed a licensing agreement with L'Oréal for the development and creation of fine fragrances.

In 2017, Proenza Schouler announced their exit from the traditional ready-to-wear calendar to align with the couture calendar. This switch changed the location of their runway shows from New York to Paris, and merged their main and pre-collections, only showing twice a year.

In November 2017 the brand launched a "sister" collection of casual basics like denim and T-shirts called White Label.

In October 2024 Proenza Schouler appointed Shira Suveyke Snyder as chief executive officer, succeeding Kay Hong who had been in the role since 2018.

=== Rachel Scott, 2025–present ===
In August 2025, Proenza Schouler announced the appointment of Rachel Scott, founder and designer of Diotima, as creative director, overseeing all categories for the brand including mainline ready-to-wear, White Label, handbags and footwear. Her first presentation for the brand debuted in February 2026 with the brand's fall 2026 collection. Scott had worked closely with the brand's design studio as a consultant during the months preceding her appointment.

== Investors ==
In 2007, the Valentino Fashion Group bought a 45% stake in Proenza Schouler. In 2011, Proenza Schouler announced a partnership with a group of investors, including Andrew Rosen, and John Howard. Castanea Partners acquired a minority interest in the brand, appointing Judd Crane as CEO in the process, in 2015.

In the last quarter of 2018, Jack McCollough and Lazaro Hernandez together with the help of private investors bought back their company's shares from Castanea Partners reclaiming full ownership of the label.

== Collaborations ==
Proenza Schouler launched its first collaboration in 2010, when they created an exclusive collection of hand painted denim with J Brand. In the same year, they collaborated with filmmaker Harmony Korine on their first original video, Act Da Fool, featuring the Fall 2010 collection. In 2013, Proenza Schouler celebrated their 10th anniversary by releasing a limited reissue of its Fall 2003 collection for Barneys New York. The following year, in 2014, the designers collaborated with MAC Cosmetics on a limited-edition makeup collection. The same year, the brand partnered with Parisian department store Le Bon Marché Rive Gauche for a capsule collection and exhibition. The exhibit allowed consumers to explore the world of Proenza Schouler through a display of 80 looks from past runway collections, a documentary about the brand, and an interactive 3-D cub installation. The following year, they collaborated with Harley Weir and Jen Brill on an original video, Legs Are Not Doors, featuring the 2015 Spring Collection. Proenza Schouler once again collaborated with Harley Weir and Jen Brill in 2016 on their second original video together, PS I Love You (Ithigi Lithigove Yithigou), featuring the Pre-Fall 2016 collection.

== Awards and honors ==
Awarded with the inaugural CFDA Vogue Fashion Fund award in 2004. Proenza Schouler has been honored with a total of five CFDA awards. In 2003, they were awarded with the Swarovski Award for Ready-to-Wear, and in 2009 they were honored with the Accessory Designer of the Year Award. In addition, they have been awarded the CFDA Womenswear Designer of the Year award three times in 2007, 2011, and 2013. In 2014, they won the Designer of the Year award at the Accessories Council's annual ACE awards. Jack McCollough and Lazaro Hernandez were honored as the special guests at the 4th edition of the Pitti W_Woman Precollection event in Florence. The following year, the designers were honored with the Fashion Star Award at the Fashion Group International's Night of Stars Gala. In 2013, the duo was honored at their alma mater, Parsons the New School for Design, at the university's annual Fashion Benefit. Proenza Schouler was awarded the Best Fashion Film at the Fashion Film Festival Milano for their original video, Legs Are Not Doors, in 2015. In 2016, Proenza Schouler had the honor of being featured in the Metropolitan Museum of Art's exhibition Manus x Machina: Fashion in an Age of Technology.

== Points of sale ==
In 2012, Proenza Schouler opened its first store, designed by architect David Adjaye, at 822 Madison Avenue in New York. The following year they opened their second store at 121 Greene Street in Soho. Proenza Schouler is sold in more than 350 retailers worldwide, including Bergdorf Goodman, Harvey Nichols, Le Bon Marché, and Lane Crawford.
