= Richard Edwards (fashion company) =

Former American fashion label

- Industry: Fashion
- Founded: 1993
- Founders: Richard Bengtsson; Edward Pavlick
- Defunct: 2002
- Headquarters: New York City, United States
- Products: Menswear; Womenswear

Richard Edwards was an American fashion design company based in New York City, operating from 1993 to 2002. It was founded by designers Richard Bengtsson and Edward Pavlick. In 1995, Bengtsson and Pavlick received the Council of Fashion Designers of America (CFDA) Perry Ellis Award for New Menswear Talent.

The duo was known for drawing inspiration from working-class uniforms such as those of lumberjacks, auto racers, and rescue workers. A 1997 Los Angeles Times article noted their fascination with blue-collar aesthetics. In 2001, Harper's Bazaar described the brand's mission as creating "laid-back, luxurious clothes that combine menswear quality with a feminine flourish".

Initially focusing on menswear, Richard Edwards later expanded to include a women's collection.
