= Ronaldus Shamask =

American fashion designer (born 1945)

Ronaldus Shamask (born November 24, 1945) is an American fashion designer.

== Biography ==
Ronaldus Shamask was born in Amsterdam, Netherlands and raised in Australia. He was trained as an architect and is self-taught in fashion design. He started his professional career a window display designer in Melbourne (1963–1966). He went on to become a fashion illustrator for The Times and The Observer in London, England from 1967 to 1968.

From 1968 to 1971 Shamask was a theatrical designer for the Company of Man performance group in Buffalo, New York. He worked as a freelance interior and clothing designer between 1971 and 1977. In 1978–1990 he formed a partnership with Murray Moss and formed the Moss Shamask Fashion Company in New York. He went on to design many more clothes. Ronaldus has won several awards since then.

== Awards ==
- American Fashion Critics Coty Award in 1981
- Council of Fashion Designers of America Award in 1987
- Confédération Internationale du Lin Fil d'Or Award in 1989
- Woolmark Award in 1989

== See also ==
- Council of Fashion Designers of America
- Coty Award
