= Bernadine Morris =

Fashion critic (1925–2018)

- Born: Bernadine Taub; Harlem, New York
- Died: January 12, 2018 (aged 92)

Bernadine Morris née Taub was a New York Times fashion critic and journalist who influenced women's fashion.

== Early life and education ==
She was born in 1925 in Harlem, New York. Morris earned an undergraduate degree from Hunter College in 1945, and then went on to earn a master's degree from New York University.

== Career ==
Morris started working in fashion weekly magazines at Millinery Research. She went on to write for Women's Wear Daily where she started as a dress editor working on what she called "cheap dresses". She also wrote for Fashion Trades, and The New York Journal-American, before joining the staff at The New York Times in 1963. Morris attended fashion shows in multiple countries, including within the United States, Europe, and Britain where she had been invited by Margaret Thatcher.

In 1980, Morris wrote "While short skirts may seem déjà vu, short pants have a lively, contemporary air" which was later used in the definition of the phrase déjà vu in Merriam Webster's Dictionary.

== Selected publications ==
- Morris, Bernadine (1978). The fashion makers (1st ed.). New York: Random House. ISBN 0-394-41166-8. OCLC 3481954.
- Morris, Bernadine (1996). Scaasi a cut above. ISBN 0-8478-1987-6. OCLC 845165772.
- Morris, Bernadine; Mirabella, Grace (1996). Valentino. Saron Hughes (Translator). Universe/Vendome, New York, NY. ISBN 9780500017562.

== Awards and honors ==
In recognition of her contributions to the fashion industry, Bernadine won the Medal of the City of Paris in 1985. She was recognized by the Council of Fashion Designers of America in the 1987 awards ceremony. In 1994 the city of Milan awarded Morris with a gold medal in recognition of her work in the fashion industry.
