= Bode (fashion brand) =

American menswear brand

BODE
- Type: Private
- Industry: Fashion
- Founded: 2016
- Founder: Emily Adams Bode Aujla
- Headquarters: New York City, U.S.
- Website: www.bodenewyork.com

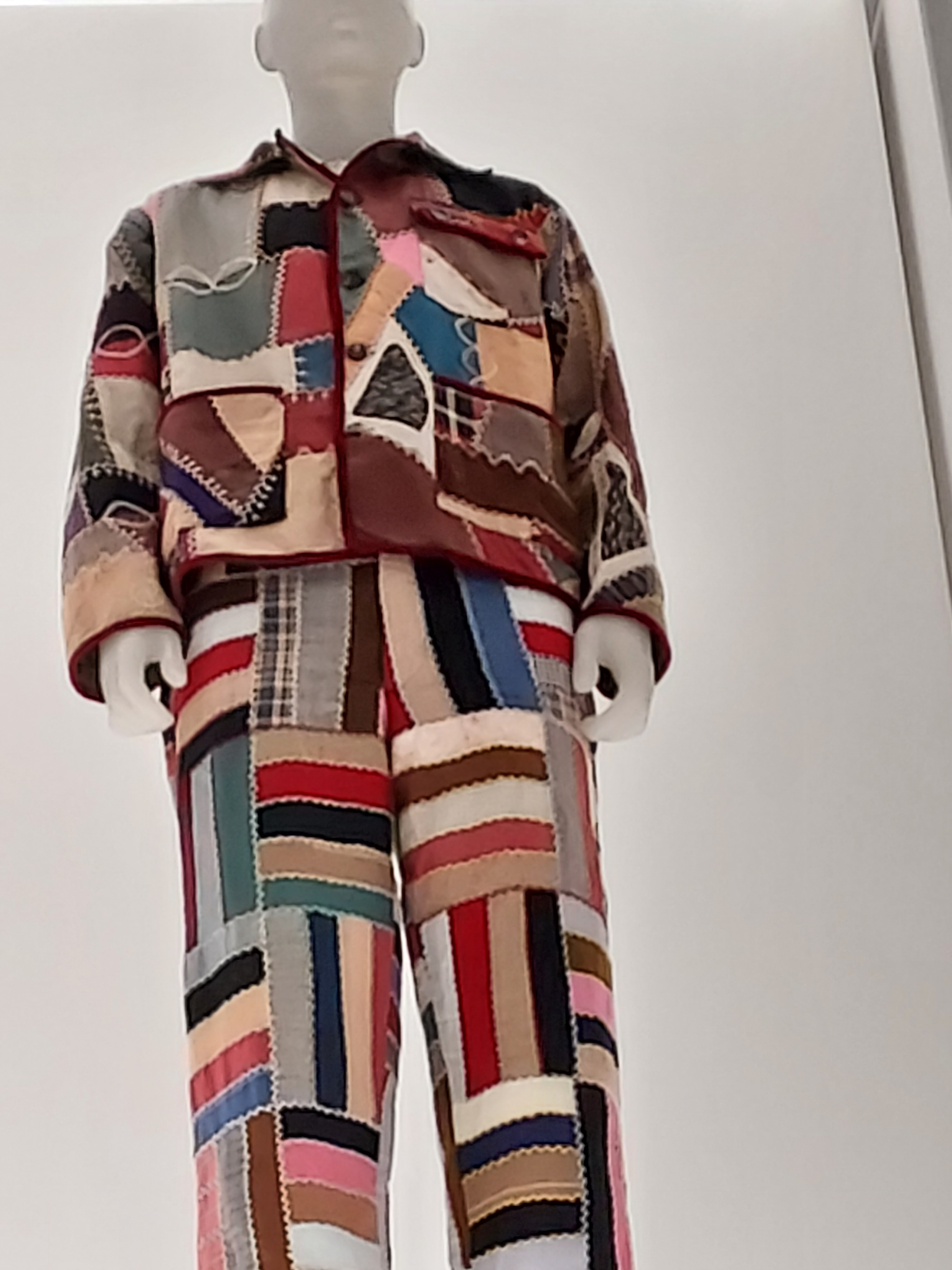
A Bode outfit on display at the Metropolitan Museum of Art's 2021 exhibition, In America: A Lexicon of Fashion

Bode (/boʊdiː/ BOH-dee) is an American clothing luxury company that makes clothing from old textiles and newly-made traditional textiles, founded in 2016 by Emily Adams Bode Aujla.

== History ==
In 2016, the brand was formally launched with a collection of garments composed entirely of antique textiles for the purpose of storytelling and preservation in American menswear.

The company opened its first retail store in 2019.

The Bode brand is known for its use of historical techniques in modern fashion, such as using quilting, mending, patchwork, sashiko, boro, and appliqué.

Emily Adams Bode Aujla was the first female designer to show at New York Fashion Week: Men's, the dedicated menswear shows at the event.

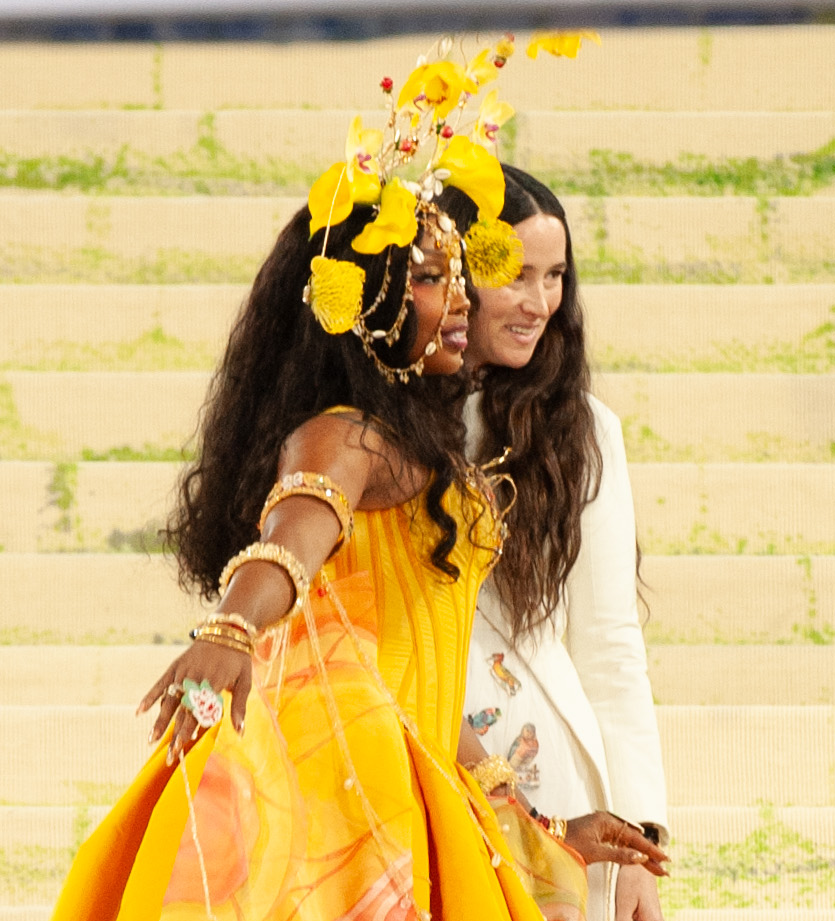
SZA (in a Bode gown) and Bode Aujla at the 2026 Met Gala

In 2023, Bode launched its first womenswear line.

The brand has office space in 161 Water Street.

== Awards ==
=== 2019 ===
- LVMH Prize Finalist
- CFDA Emerging Designer of the Year
- Business of Fashion 500
- Forbes 30 Under 30
- GQ’s Breakthrough Designer of the Year

=== 2020 ===
- Woolmark Prize: Karl Lagerfeld Award for Innovation

=== 2021 ===
- CFDA Menswear Designer of the Year

=== 2022 ===
- CFDA Menswear Designer of the Year
- Cooper Hewitt National Design Award: Emerging Designer
