= Christian Francis Roth =

American fashion designer

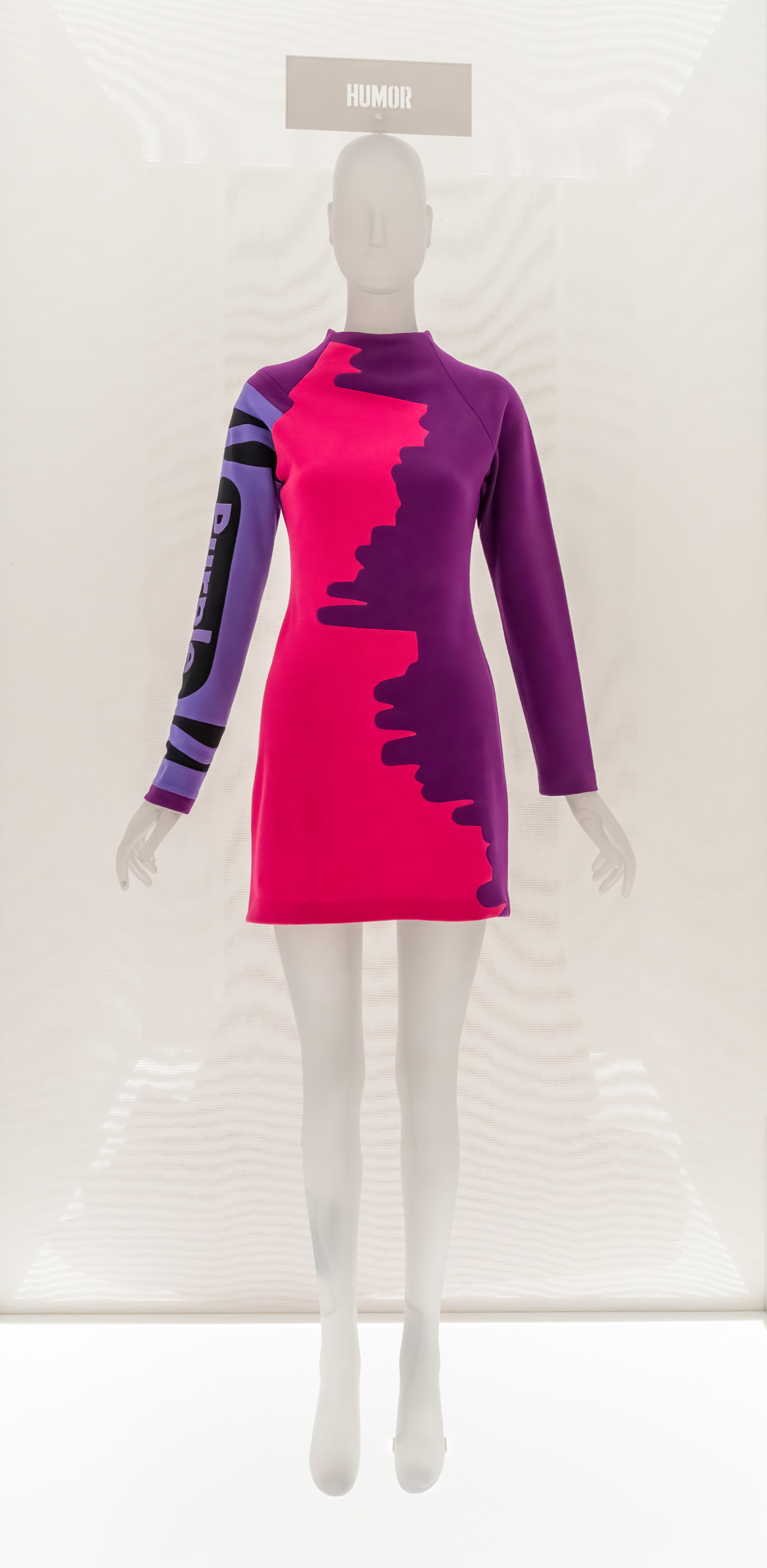
Roth's "Crayon" dress from 1990-91 on display at the Metropolitan Museum of Art's exhibition, In America: A Lexicon of Fashion

Christian Francis Roth is an American fashion designer based in New York. Roth was awarded the Perry Ellis Award for New Fashion Talent in 1990 at the age of 21 by the Council of Fashion Designers of America. Roth's designs were seen frequently throughout the 1990s in publications such as Vogue, Elle, W, New York Magazine, Harper's Bazaar, The New York Times, and others. Several of Roth’s designs can be found in the permanent collection of the Metropolitan Museum of Art Costume Institute, with work appearing in multiple exhibitions.

== Early life and education ==
Roth was born in New York City in 1969 and began his career as an apprentice to designer Koos Van Den Akker in the summer of 1986. He spent a little over a year learning the trade, including basic cutting, sewing, and pressing techniques, after which, he was allowed to design items such as scarves and eventually garments, which were sold at Van Den Akker’s Madison Avenue store. Roth continued his employment with Van Den Akker while taking night classes at the Fashion Institute of Technology and Parsons School of Design from 1986-1987 and 1987-1988 respectively. In 1988, Van Den Akker gave Roth a room in his studio to begin designing his own collection. One year later, Roth opened his own design studio on the edge of New York’s garment district.

== Career ==
Roth’s first collection debuted in the autumn of 1988, featuring tailored wool jackets adorned with pop art motifs such as barking dogs, dance step patterns and clothespins. The collection was purchased by Saks Fifth Avenue and put on display in the windows. In following collections, Roth would expand on his humor based aesthetic. A wool jacket was decorated with appliqué leather “M&M’s” packaging and covered button "candies". Roth's wool jersey “Mannequin Dress” (Fall 1989) was modeled after the classic design studio dress form. Roth's iconic crayon inspired jackets and dresses (Fall 1990) transformed a raglan sleeve into a writing instrument while using the body as a canvas for colorful inset "scribbles". Hallmark Cards, Inc., the company that owned Crayola crayons, felt that these crayon designs infringed on their brand. They ultimately settled out of court and agreed on a licensing fee. By this time, Roth's designs were already being carried by stores such as Bergdorf Goodman, Neiman Marcus, Saks Fifth Avenue, Barneys and Bloomingdale's.

Later collections featured color-blocked styles inspired by Matisse’s decoupages, intricate wool patchwork reminiscent of Amish quilts, and giant dollar bills printed on silk organza. Roth's use of trompe l'oeil earned him the nickname “Schiaparelli of the ‘90s”. Roth is noted for helping bring grunge-inspired fashion to the runways, along with Marc Jacobs for Perry Ellis and Anna Sui in 1992. Designer Lela Rose got her start working for Roth as an assistant designer after her graduation from Parsons School of Design in 1993.

Sales reached $2 million a year at the height of the Christian Francis Roth label. Roth struggled to turn a profit due to the high production costs of domestic manufacturing, leading to the label’s closure in 1995. From 1996 to 2000, Roth designed a diffusion line under the “CFR Christian Francis Roth” label in partnership with Equals 4, Inc. He would go on to design for Nordstrom Product Group, Tommy Bahama, and others.

From 2008 to 2013, Roth designed a contemporary collection under the “Francis by Christian Francis Roth” label. He also designed collections for QVC under the label "Twist by Christian Francis Roth" in 2010 and 2011. In 2017, Roth collaborated with Archie Comics and designed a line of apparel and accessories inspired by their Betty and Veronica characters.
