= Renaldo Fenty =

Barbadian footballer

Personal information
- Date of birth: 13 December 1977 (age 48)
- Place of birth: Barbados
- Position: Defender

Team information
- Current team: Weymouth Wales

Senior career*
Years	Team	Apps	(Gls)
2006	Tudor Bridge		
2009–	Weymouth Wales		

International career
2006–	Barbados	9	(0)
- * Club domestic league appearances and goals

Renaldo Fenty (born 13 December 1977) is a Barbadian footballer who currently plays for the Weymouth Wales as a defender.

== Career ==
He played for the Tudor Bridge and Weymouth Wales. He made his international debut for Barbados in 2006.
