= 161 Water Street =

Office building in Manhattan, New York

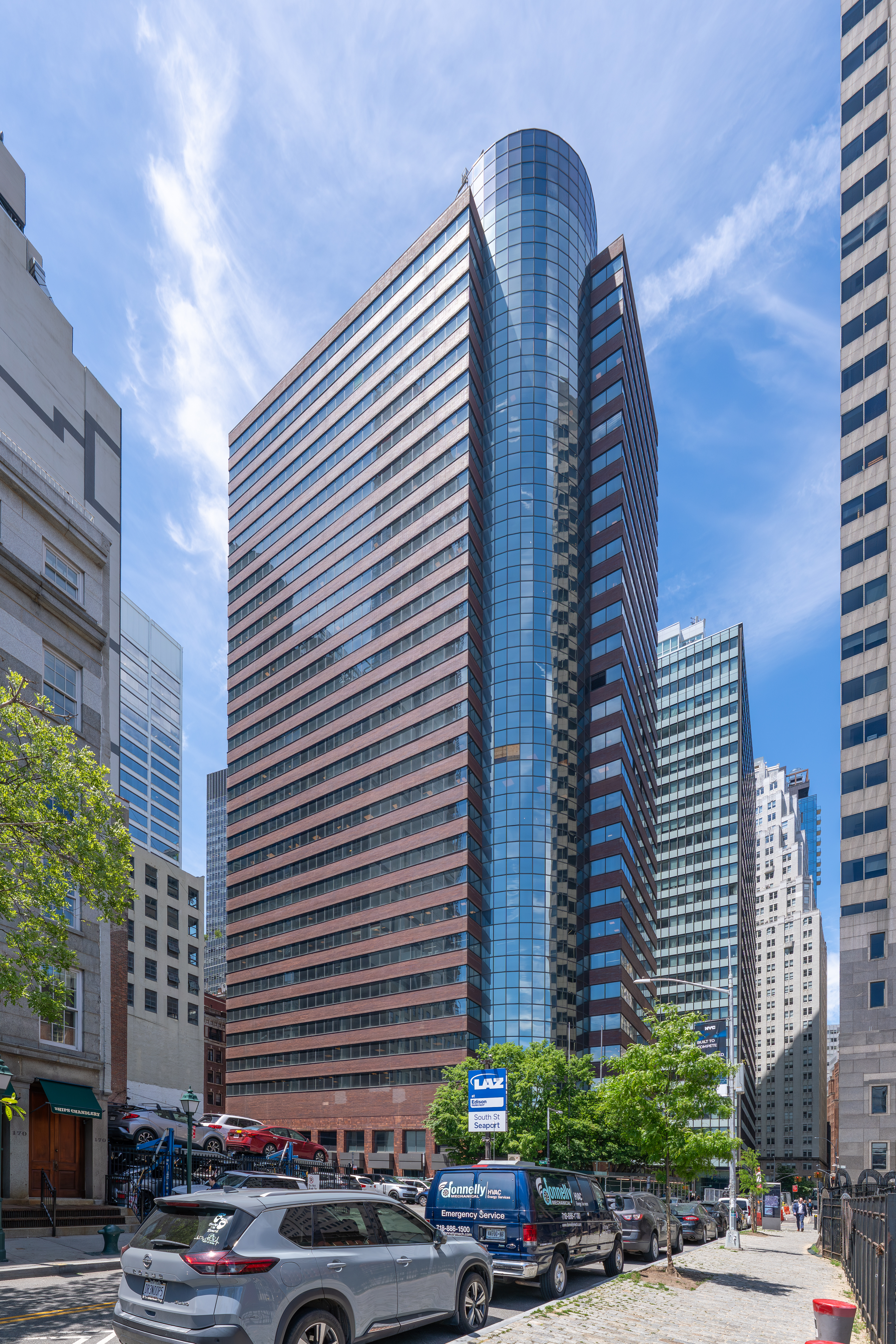
- 161 Water Street in 2026
- Interactive map of the 161 Water Street area

General information
- Type: Office
- Location: New York City, United States
- Coordinates: 40°42′23″N 74°00′18″W
- Completed: 1983

Technical details
- Floor area: 685,000 ft^{2} (63,600 m^{2})

Design and construction
- Architect: Fox & Fowle

161 Water Street (also referred to as the Water Street Associates Building and formerly referred to as 175 Water Street) is an office building in the Financial District of Manhattan in New York City.

== History ==
Three commercial buildings, constructed in the 19th century, previously occupied the site. In 1982, during the course of an archaeological excavation conducted as 161 Water Street was built, an 18th-century ship was discovered. Portions of the ship and other artifacts were sent to the Mariners' Museum in Newport News.

161 Water Street was completed in 1983. The building was designed by Fox & Fowle. Before completion, the entire building was leased to National Westminster Bank. In 1995, AIG purchased the building from National Westminster Bank. The building became AIG's headquarters in 1996, and in 2021 the firm vacated the building for a new headquarters at 1271 Avenue of the Americas.

Metro Loft entered into contract to purchase the building from AIG in 2019. An entity linked to Ken Dart purchased the building from Vanbarton Group in 2022. Vanbarton sold the building after zoning changes that might have permitted the conversion of the building from an office property to housing did not occur.

The owners of the building received a tax break of $41.3 million over a 20 year period in January 2024. This tax break was granted through New York City's "M-CORE" program, which provides tax breaks to owners of office buildings with high vacancy rates, freeing funds for renovations. At the time the tax break was granted, 95% of the building's leasable space was empty.

== Tenants ==
Tenants of the building include fashion brand Bode and Ghia, a beverage company. The building has been used as a site for parties and fashion shows.
