= Tom Binns Design =

Jewellery design company

Tom Binns Design is a jewellery design company founded in 2004 by jeweller Tom Binns and CEO Cristina Viera Newton.

== Career ==
Binns has been designing, manufacturing and distributing jewellery for almost thirty years, starting with his Punkature collaboration in the early 1980s with Vivienne Westwood and Malcolm McLaren, after which Binns became “Westwood’s right-hand man.” Binns has been credited by The Independent Magazine with pioneering “a Dada-inspired approach to jewellery, fusing precious jewels with household junk.” Key themes from the Dada movement are deliberate irrationality, anarchy, anti-bourgeoise and the rejection of standard beauty and social organisation.

Tom Binns Design has now adorned icons ranging from Michelle Obama, who wore Tom Binns Design jewellery whilst visiting Ireland and Britain in May 2011, to Lady Gaga, who was styled in a fluorescent yellow Slap Dash necklace for the March 2011 issue of American Vogue.

== Awards ==
- 2006 Accessory Designer of the Year from the Council of Fashion Designers of America;
- 2007 Best Accessories Designer from British Fashion Council;
- 2010 Elle Style Awards for Best Jewellery Designer.
