= Emily Adams Bode Aujla =

American fashion designer (born 1989)

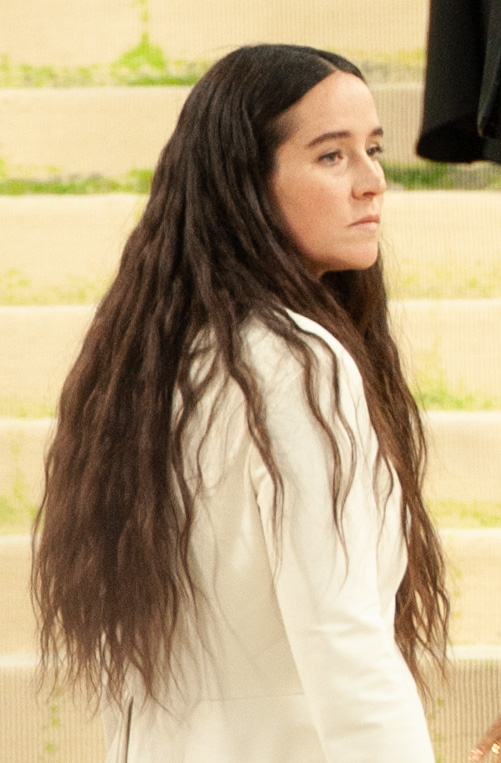
- Bode Aujla at the 2026 Met Gala
- Born: June 13, 1989 (age 37); Atlanta, Georgia, United States
- Education: Parsons School of Design; Eugene Lang College of Liberal Arts
- Occupation: Fashion designer
- Notable work: Founder of BODE
- Spouse: Aaron Aujla

Emily Adams Bode Aujla (née Emily Adams Bode; born June 13, 1989) is an American fashion designer and the founder of fashion brand BODE. She was the first woman to present at New York Fashion Week: Men's, and has twice been named the Council of Fashion Designers of America's American Menswear Designer of the Year, in 2021 and 2022.

== Early life and education ==
Bode Aujla was born and raised in Atlanta, Georgia, United States, and studied in Switzerland. In 2013, she graduated from the Parsons School of Design and Eugene Lang College of Liberal Arts with a BA/BFA dual degree in menswear design and philosophy.

== Career ==
Before founding Bode, she worked in the design studios of Marc Jacobs and Ralph Lauren. The brand was formally launched in 2016. Its initial collection were created from antique textiles. This collection began the brand's cornerstone of storytelling and preservation in American menswear. In February 2017, she was the first female designer to show at New York Fashion Week: Men's, the dedicated menswear shows at the event.

In June 2019, she staged her first runway show at Paris Fashion Week: Men's, presenting a spring/summer 2020 collection inspired by her family's history as wagonmakers for the Ringling Bros. and Barnum & Bailey Circus.

The brand opened its first store, on Hester Street in New York's Lower East Side, in 2019, followed by a second store on Melrose Avenue in Los Angeles in 2022. In March 2025, the brand opened its first location outside the United States, on the rue de Valois in Paris, and in February 2026 it opened its first store in Asia, in the Yoyogi-Uehara district of Tokyo.

In January 2023, Bode Aujla returned to the Paris runway to present the brand's first womenswear collection at the Théâtre du Châtelet, drawing on the history of her mother's family.

In 2024, she launched Bode Rec., an activewear line, together with the brand's first collaboration with Nike.

Bode's clothing has been worn by public figures including Harry Styles, Mick Jagger, Jordan Peele, Bruno Mars, and the Jonas Brothers.

== Awards and honors ==
Bode Aujla was runner-up in the CFDA/Vogue Fashion Fund in 2018, won the Emerging Designer of the Year title at the CFDA Awards in 2019, and was an LVMH prize and Woolmark prize finalist in 2019 and 2020, respectively. In 2019, she was named to Forbes' 30 Under 30 list in the art and style category. As a 2020 Woolmark Prize finalist, she received the inaugural Karl Lagerfeld Award for Innovation. Bode Aujla was named the CFDA's American Menswear Designer of the Year in 2021 and again in 2022, and in 2022 she also received the Cooper Hewitt, Smithsonian Design Museum's National Design Award for emerging designer.

== Personal life ==
Bode Aujla is married to interior designer Aaron Aujla, co-founder of Green River Project design firm. The two married in the yard of their home. The couple planned the wedding themselves and enlisted the help of their respective brands–Bode designed the menswear, bridesmaid dresses, lobster bibs, and Pagri. The wedding became the inspiration for her 2022 Pre-Fall collection.
