= Alexandre Plokhov =

Russian-born American clothing designer (born 1967)

Alexandre Plokhov (born 1967, Naro-Fominsk, USSR) is a Russian-born American clothing designer. He designed for Cloak, Gianni Versace Uomo, Alexandre Plokhov, Helmut Lang and Nomenklatura Studio labels.

== Early life and education ==
Plokhov originally trained as an interpreter at The Maurice Thorez State Pedagogical Institute of Foreign Languages and served in the armed forces of the USSR. In 1990 he made the career switch to clothing design and moved to the United States.

== Career in fashion ==
After studying and apprenticing for a tailor in Chicago, Plokhov moved to New York in 1997 to work as a men's pattern-maker for Marc Jacobs before founding Cloak, the New York-based menswear label, in 1999.

Plokhov is known for his somewhat severe designs that often romanticize a tough masculine ideal inspired by a range of male costumes from military uniforms to safari suits.

=== Cloak ===
In 1999, he founded the fashion label Cloak known for an aesthetic merging elegant hand-tailoring with gothic, military-style detailing.

Described as a cult success, Cloak was presented with the Ecco Domani award in 2003 and was the recipient of both the 2004 CFDA/Vogue Fashion Foundation Fund Award and the 2005 CFDA Swarovski Perry Ellis Award for Menswear.

As part of the CFDA/Vogue Fund Alexandre was featured in the documentary,"Seamless" by acclaimed director Douglas Keeve.

=== Versace ===
In March 2007 Plokhov was hired as the Head Designer for Gianni Versace Uomo in Milan, Italy. Alexandre worked in Milan for six seasons hand-in-hand with the brand's Artistic Director Donatella Versace.

Trade publication Women's Wear Daily noted at the time that the merge of Plokhov's style "added a degree of steely tailoring that gelled well with Donatella's vision."

His last collection for the Versace label was Fall/Winter 2010.

=== Eponymous Line ===
In 2011, Plokhov launched his eponymous line, Alexandre Plokhov, which showcased his signature dark, tailored style. Showing a presentation in Paris and a short video directed by Douglas Keeve (Unzipped), Alexandre re-entered the industry with an offering targeted at his previous, now somewhat more mature, Cloak customers. Plokhov's Spring 2013 collection included influences from the clothing of Russian Orthodox monks in Zimbardo's book "The Monks of Dust".

The line received positive reviews from fashion critics at The New York Times and Women's Wear Daily. His collections were praised for their precision and modern approach to classic menswear staples.

Alexandre Plokhov's womenswear was introduced during Fall/Winter 2015 season.

Deciding to focus solely on Helmut Lang, Plokhov released his last collection for his namesake label in Spring Summer 2016.

=== Helmut Lang ===
In 2013, Plokhov was appointed the Design Director for the relaunched Helmut Lang brand. During his tenure, critics described his work as "reimagining and refracting sartorial staples through a modernist lens".

While at Helmut Lang, in 2017 Mr. Plokhov spearheaded a collaboration with the American hip-hop artist Travis Scott.

=== Nomenklatura Studio ===
In 2018 Plokhov launched a direct-to-consumer line called Nomenklatura Studio.

Nomenklatura Studio used premium textiles like Japanese cotton and Italian leather, assembled with American craftsmanship. The brand's collections focused on limited numbered runs that adhered to its core principles of utility and durability. The aesthetics again highlighted Plokhov's blend of military codes with refined tailoring.

=== Collaboration with Uniqlo ===
Plokhov's collaboration with Uniqlo began with the Designers Invitation Project in 2006-2007, where he brought Cloak's design sensibilities to a wider audience through affordable, ready-to-wear collections.

This relationship was later revisited in 2014, with Plokhov this time bringing his aesthetic to a collaborative line of "Uniqlo Urban Sweats". Publications like GQ and W Magazine noted the collaboration's balance of comfort with an avant-garde "architectural edge".
