= The Row (fashion label) =

American fashion label

- Industry: Fashion
- Founded: 2006
- Founder: Ashley Olsen; Mary-Kate Olsen
- Headquarters: New York City, United States
- Number of locations: 5 stores (2024)
- Key people: Ashley Olsen (CEO); Mary-Kate Olsen (creative director)
- Owner: TR Holding (2023-present)
- Parent: Dualstar (2005-2023)
- Website: therow.com/us

The Row is an American luxury fashion label established by Mary-Kate and Ashley Olsen in 2006 in New York City. The Row produces ready-to-wear clothing, footwear, handbags and accessories. The label has five monobrand stores and is available in 37 countries.

== History ==
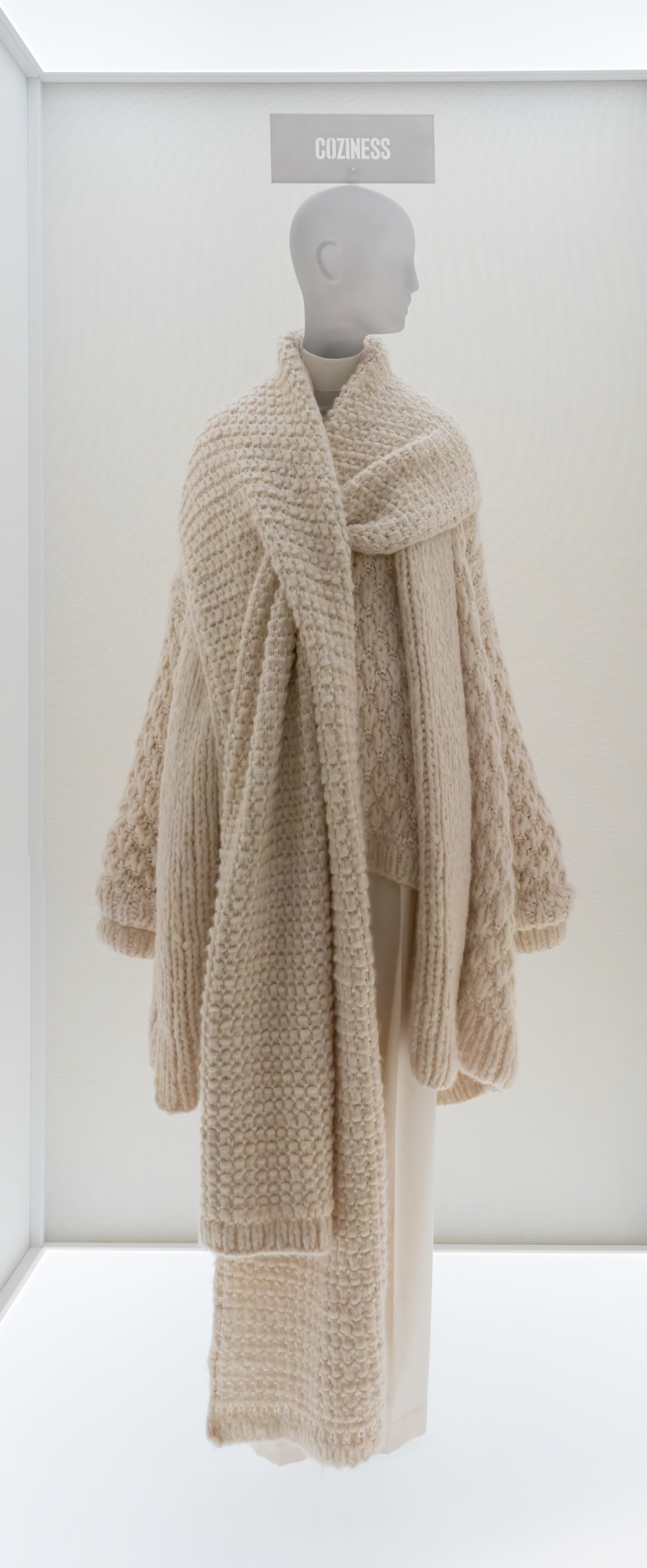
A knit ensemble on display at the Metropolitan Museum of Art for the In America: A Lexicon of Fashion exhibition in 2022

The idea for the brand started as a personal project in 2005 when Ashley Olsen challenged herself to create a perfect T-shirt. She tested the design on a variety of women of all body shapes and ages in an attempt to find a "commonality in fit and attitude". In 2006, the Olsens created a 7-piece collection that included the T-shirt, a pair of cotton sateen leggings, and a cashmere wool tank dress. Barneys New York bought the entire collection. The brand has expanded to include ready-to-wear clothing, resort clothing, handbags, sunglasses (in collaboration with Linda Farrow) and shoes. The brand is named after Savile Row in London.

In 2008, Lauren Hutton modeled for the brand's first look book. Hutton explained: "... I saw the clothes, and they were wonderful, real simple, minimalist designs ... Ash had a place on the beach, so we did it at her place ... And they would dance on the deck, and I would do what they were doing. And it was good." Hutton accompanied the Olsens to the Council of Fashion Designers of America's annual awards show in 2012, the year they won their first Womenswear Designer of the Year award.

The Olsens work primarily out of The Row's Tribeca studio at 609 Greenwich Street in New York City, which they have occupied since 2012. A Paris office was opened in 2011 and a London office opened in 2019. Initially, the Olsens did not want their names attached to the brand and preferred to let the clothes speak for themselves. They did not give an interview about The Row for the first three years after its inception.

The Row first created a menswear collection for spring 2011, and in October 2016 the label launched a new collection of menswear at their Los Angeles and New York stores, with the intention to continue expanding the offerings.

In August 2018, The Row announced a complete menswear collection that included suiting, denim, and knits. The Olsens conducted two years of research prior to launching the collection, which became available in stores in October 2018.

In July 2020, it was reported The Row was weathering financial difficulties and had laid off half of its staff, stemming from the COVID-19 pandemic and the bankruptcy of Barneys New York, one of its largest accounts.

In September 2021, it was announced that The Row had launched its first children's collection.

The Cut estimated that The Row reached $100 million in sales per year in 2021.

In 2024, Chanel owners Alain and Gérard Wertheimer and L’Oreal heiress Françoise Bettencourt Meyers bought stakes in The Row, valuing the brand at around $1 billion. The Olsens remain majority stakeholders.

== Retail locations ==
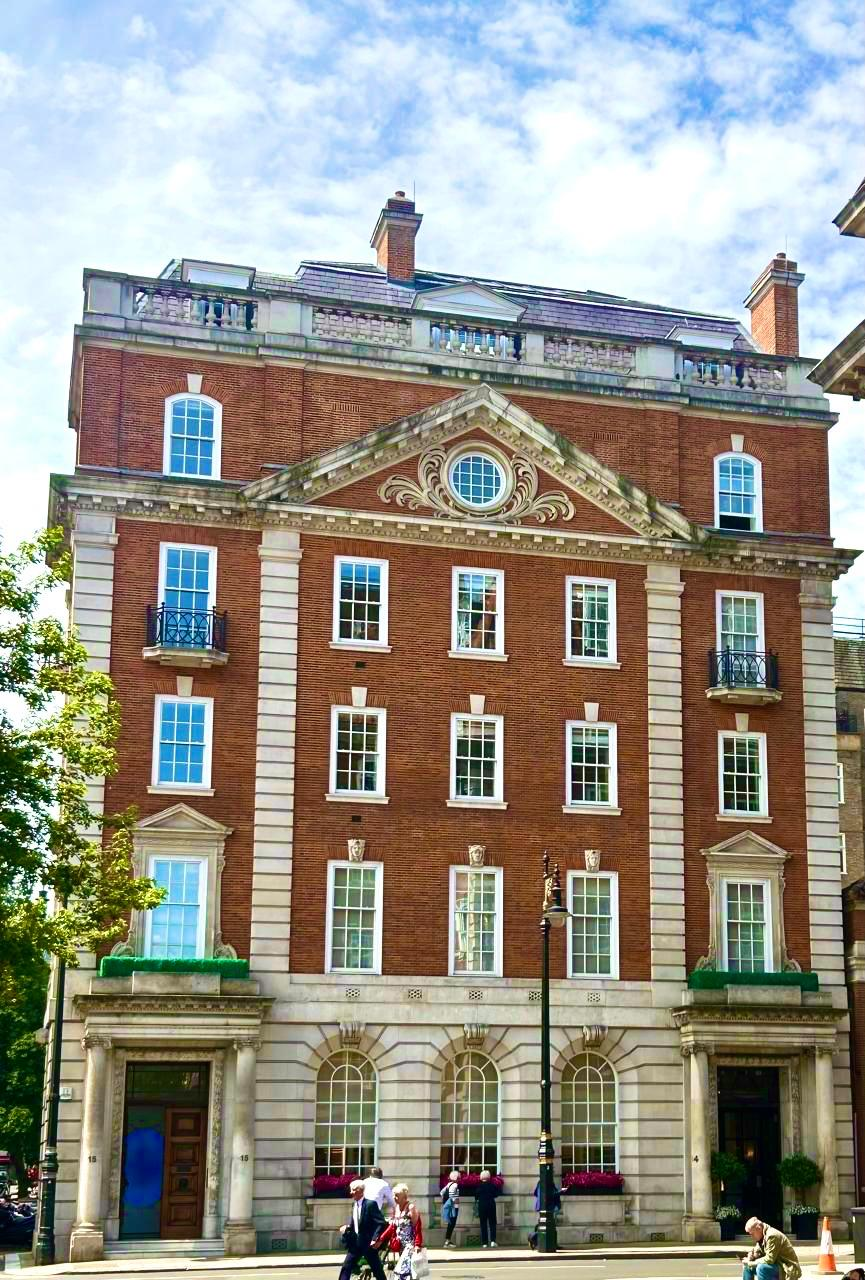
The Row's London flagship store at 15 Carlos Place, Mayfair House

As of 2015, The Row was available in 164 stores in 37 countries.

In 2014, The Row opened its first store on Melrose Avenue in Los Angeles inside a converted home that is hidden from the street. The store was designed by David Montalba and Courtney Applebaum and won an American Architecture Award from The Chicago Athenaeum in 2016.

In May 2016, the brand's second flagship store opened in New York City's Upper East Side with the brand's pre-fall 2016 collection. A London store opened in 2019.

== Marketing ==
The brand's collections are regularly presented at New York Fashion Week and have been presented twice at Paris Fashion Week. The spring 2016 collection was shown at the Château de Courances.

== Collaborations ==
In 2011, The Row collaborated with Toms Shoes for a limited-edition collection for Tom's one-for-one model.

In 2012, The Row teamed up with Damien Hirst to create a line of luxury backpacks.

In 2015, The Row collaborated with Oliver Peoples on an eyewear collection, which included both optical frames and sunglasses. In 2018, The Row collaborated with Oliver Peoples on a second eyewear collection. The collection was inspired by styles popular in the 1990s.

In February 2018, The Row collaborated with the Noguchi Museum for their fall 2018 show at New York Fashion Week. The Olsens filled their showroom with sculptures by Isamu Noguchi, and their models walked among them. In September 2018, The Row again collaborated with the Noguchi Museum for an installation at the Dover Street Market in New York. The installation included a selection of looks from the brand's fall 2018 collection, two sculptures by Noguchi, and three Akari light sculpture panels.

== Awards ==
Year	Awarding Organization	Category	Result	Ref
2012	CFDA Fashion Awards	Womenswear Designer of the Year	Won	
2012	Wall Street Journal	Innovator of the Year: Fashion	Won	
2014	CFDA Fashion Awards	Accessories Designer of the Year	Won	
2015	CFDA Fashion Awards	Accessories Designer of the Year	Nominated	
2015	CFDA Fashion Awards	Womenswear Designer of the Year	Won	
2016	CFDA Fashion Awards	Accessories Designer of the Year	Nominated	
2016	CFDA Fashion Awards	Womenswear Designer of the Year	Nominated	
2017	CFDA Fashion Awards	Accessories Designer of the Year	Nominated	
2017	CFDA Fashion Awards	Womenswear Designer of the Year	Nominated	
2018	CFDA Fashion Awards	Accessories Designer of the Year	Won	
2018	CFDA Fashion Awards	Womenswear Designer of the Year	Nominated	
2019	CFDA Fashion Awards	Accessories Designer of the Year	Won	
2020	CFDA Fashion Awards	Womenswear Designer of the Year	Nominated	
2020	CFDA Fashion Awards	Accessories Designer of the Year	Nominated	
2021	CFDA Fashion Awards	Accessories Designer of the Year	Nominated	

== See also ==
- Khaite
