= Fenty X Puma =

Fashion collaboration

Fenty X Puma (stylized FEИTY x PUMA; aka Fenty Puma Creeper or simply Fenty Creeper), is a fashion collaboration between Barbadian singer-songwriter and businesswoman Rihanna and German clothing manufacturer Puma. Rihanna first partnered with Puma in 2014 as the creative director and brand ambassador appearing in advertisements in 2015. In 2016, the debut colorway collection was launched with a live-streamed fashion show, a day before Kanye West unveiled Yeezy Season 4.
