= Anna Sui =

American fashion designer (born 1955)

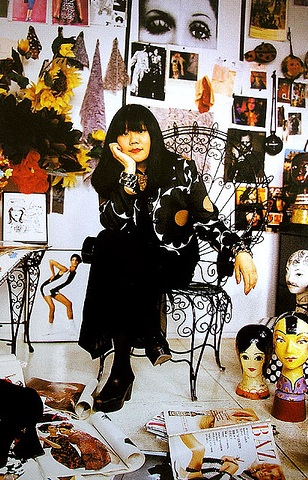
- Sui in 2009
- Born: August 4, 1955 (age 71); Detroit, Michigan, U.S.
- Education: Parsons School of Design
- Occupation: Fashion designer
- Labels: Anna Sui; Dolly Girl by Anna Sui; Anna Sui Mini; Anna Sui Vision; The Souvenir Shop Anna Sui
- Awards: CFDA Perry Ellis New Talent Award; Time – Top 5 Fashion Icons of the Decade; CFDA Geoffrey Beene Lifetime Achievement Award; Bravo A-List Award; Classic Icon of Fashion and Design; Identities – Leadership in the Arts Award; 2017 Honorary Doctorate Recipient, The New School
- Website: annasui.com

Anna Sui

Chinese name
- Traditional Chinese: 蕭志美
- Simplified Chinese: 萧志美
Transcriptions
Standard Mandarin
- Hanyu Pinyin: Xiāo Zhìměi
- Wade–Giles: Hsiao^{1} Chih^{4}-Mei^{3}

Japanese name
- Kana: アナスイ
Transcriptions
- Romanization: Anasui

Anna Sui (Chinese: 蕭志美; pinyin: Xiāo Zhìměi; born August 4, 1955) is an American fashion designer. Her brand categories include several fashion lines, footwear, cosmetics, fragrances, eyewear, jewelry, accessories and home goods.

Sui was named one of the "Top 5 Fashion Icons of the Decade" for 2000–2010, and in 2009 earned the Geoffrey Beene Lifetime Achievement Award from the Council of Fashion Designers of America (CFDA), joining the ranks of Yves Saint Laurent, Giorgio Armani, Ralph Lauren, and Diane von Furstenberg.

== Early life and family origins ==
Sui is a second-generation Chinese-American born in Detroit, Michigan. Her father, Paul Sui (Chinese: 蕭惠光; pinyin: Xiāo Huìguāng) and mother, Grace Sui Fang (方光琪; Fāng Guāngqí) met while studying at the Sorbonne in Paris where Sui's father was studying engineering and her mother, painting. Her paternal grandparents were Xiao Yulan (蕭毓蘭; Xiāo Yùlán), a Tahitian-Chinese businessman, and his wife Qiu Daidi (丘帶娣; Qiū Dàidì). Her maternal grandparents were Fang Chih, a Chinese diplomat and his Japanese wife named Fang I-chih (born Masue Ueki).

Sui is a matrilineal descendant of the prominent Fang clan of Tongcheng, Anhui, notable for its many scholars and philosophers. She is an 18th generation descendant of Fang Bao, an influential Chinese poet who founded the Tongcheng School of literary prose popular throughout the Qing Empire. Notable ancestors also include Fang Gongcheng, tutor of the imperial palace, and Fang Guancheng, Viceroy of Zhili seated at Tianjin from 1749 to 1768 amongst other Qing era scholars. Her niece is actress and model Chase Sui Wonders.

By the time she was four years old, Sui knew she wanted to be a fashion designer. Sui's mother taught her about putting together a wardrobe, bringing a young Sui with her to shop for fabrics. Sui would spend hours watching her mother sew and would collect the fabric scraps to clothe her Barbie dolls and her brothers' army action figures. Through this process, Sui learned the basics of making clothing and soon she was putting together her own outfits. This was accomplished by buying pattern pieces for the sleeves of a dress, and swapping them to match other dresses, to create her own look for the garments.

As a teen, she read an article in Life magazine about the achievements of Mia Fonssagrives-Solow and Vicky Tiel who graduated from Parsons School of Design in New York City and then moved to Paris, where Elizabeth Taylor and Richard Burton opened a boutique with the girls. Sui credits reading this article as a pivotal moment in her youth, which gave her clear direction on her goals for her future.

== Early career ==
Sui moved to New York and attended Parsons, but after finishing her second year, Sui was hired in 1975 by Erica Elias' juniors clothing label Charlie's Girls, where she learned by designing for sportswear labels and doing styling on the photography shoots of friend and former Parsons' classmate Steven Meisel. Sui's work as a stylist for Meisel's shoots featured in the Italian magazine Lei specifically were very well received. After the closing of Charlie's Girls, Sui worked for several other sportswear designers including Bobbie Brooks and Simultanee.

During this time, she began designing and making clothes out of her apartment. Sui stated that she was inspired to branch out on her own by a desire to dress rock stars and people who attended their concerts. Indeed, during this period, the majority of her personal business was focused on targeting sales to music stores. While working for the sportswear company Glenora, she brought her collection of five pieces to a New York trade show, and caught the attention of New York department stores Bloomingdale's and Macy's.

A few weeks later, in August 1979, those clothes were featured in a full-page Macy's ad in the Sunday edition of The New York Times. The manager at Glenora, where Sui was still on the payroll, was furious when he saw the advertisement in the Times and fired her on the spot. Left without a job, Sui took her $300 in savings and started a business out of a little corner of the living room in her apartment. For several years Sui ran the company out of her apartment, doing odd-jobs for spare income and reinvesting every penny of earnings into her business.

== Anna Sui line ==
The 1980s was the height of "power-dressing", with companies such as Chanel, Lacroix and Versace setting the standard. Sui struggled to stand up next to the big-name fashion houses. Sui was one of the few designers of the period who distanced herself from the traditional fashion houses and explored the grunge fashion scene together with designers such as Marc Jacobs, Daryl K and Todd Oldham. Around 1987, Sui got the opportunity to move her line into Annette B, a showroom curated by Annette Breindel. Breindel, who had a history of nurturing young designers, was a major influence for Sui and helped the designer emerge onto the fashion scene. During this period, Sui finally was able to move her operation out of her apartment and into the garment district. By the late 1980s, Sui had gained a global cult-like following, getting the attention of Japanese fashion powerhouses such as Onward Kashiyama. Sui would go on to greatly expand Japanese operations in the mid 90s.

At Paris Fashion Week in 1991, Sui received one of the first major breakthroughs of her career. Sui was driving with her friend Steven Meisel to see the Jean Paul Gaultier show. On the way to the show, they stopped to pick up Madonna, a friend of Meisel's. Madonna surprised Sui by wearing her clothing to the event. Madonna would later wear the same outfit again for Meisel's photoshoot for Vogue. Sui's first runway show took place later that year upon her return to New York City.

In 1991, Meisel, Paul Cavaco and Sui's supermodel friends, Naomi Campbell, Christy Turlington and Linda Evangelista, got together and encouraged her to try a runway show. Sui rented a small space in the Meatpacking District and paid the models by giving them the clothes. The successful show was the biggest breakthrough of Sui's career, with The New York Times commenting in reference to Sui's celebrity runway models: "That those beauties [Campbell and Evangelista] were then at the height of their fame helped stoke the reception Sui got from buyers and the news media."

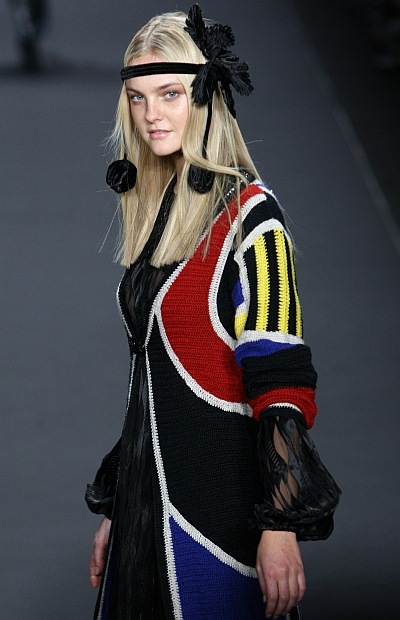
Caroline Trentini for Anna Sui Spring/Summer 2011

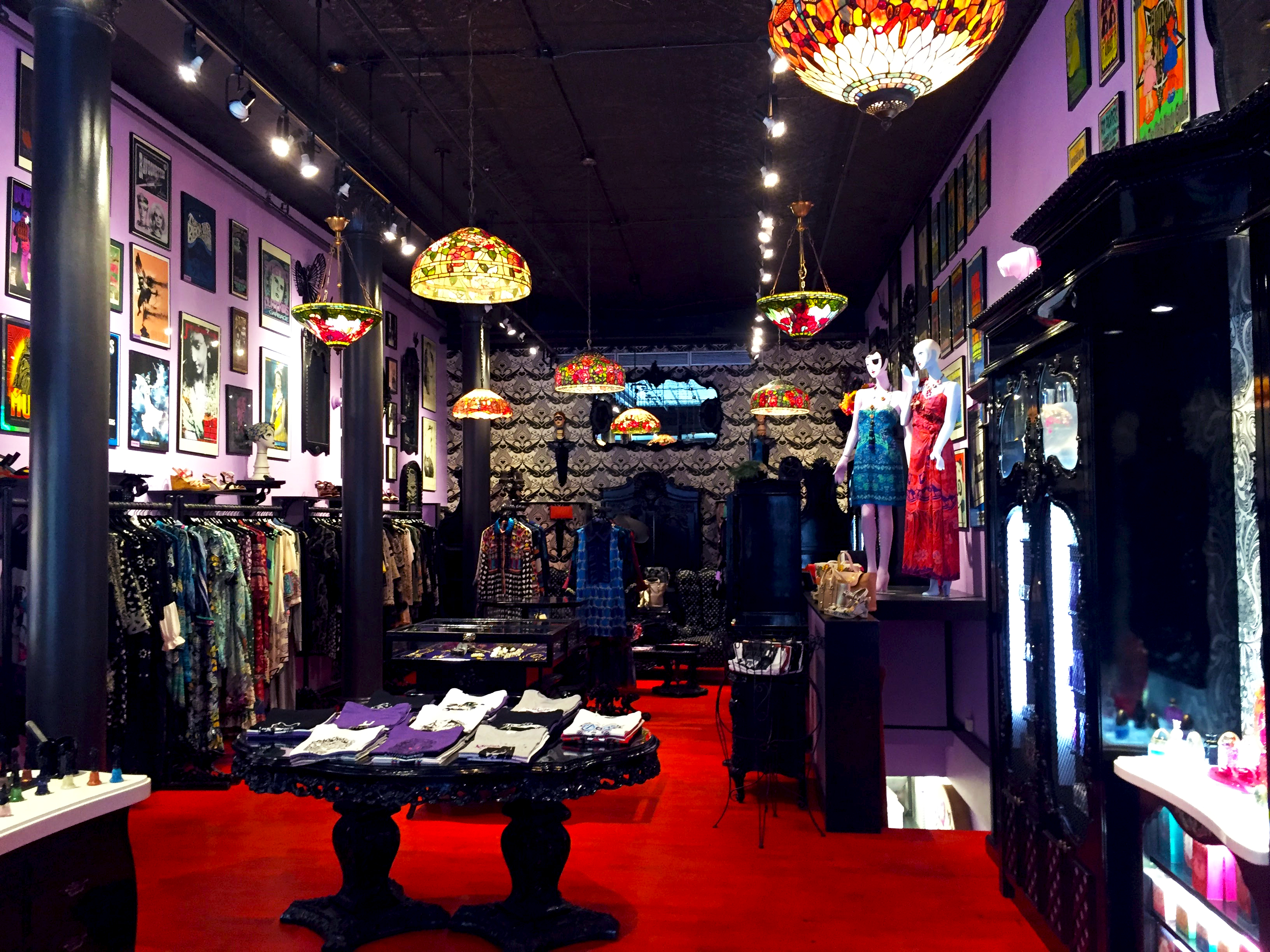
The flagship Anna Sui store at 484 Broome Street, New York City

From her first show, Sui was known for her light-hearted, whimsical, homemade and entertaining approach to showcasing her collections. The influences came from contemporary shows by designers such as Thierry Mugler and Jean Paul Gaultier where one of the goals was to charm the audience with the atmosphere created. The atmosphere often had a distinct party vibe and the antics of guests and participants were described as a distinct cultural scene of the period. Starting in 1995, Sui's designs were showcased regularly in Vogue Patterns. Her debut with the style magazine featured dresses from her Spring/Summer 1995 collection inspired by period pulp comics and the puffed sleeve, square shouldered, floral dress fashion popular during the war rationing years of 1940s era fashion.

== Retail presence ==
The designer opened her first retail location in 1992 at 113 Greene Street in New York City's Soho District. The flagship store was known for its red floors, antique black furniture, signature dolly head mannequins and its purple walls which Sui painted herself.

In 1993, the Anna Sui Corporation opened a store in Hollywood at La Brea Avenue expanding coverage and controlling North American distribution. The same year, Sui introduced menswear into her runway collections with Mick Jagger later appearing on Saturday Night Live in one of the designer's suits. Later, in June 2015, Sui relocated her Soho flagship store to 424 Broome Street from its previous 23 year long location on Greene Street. The store moved out of the Broome Street space in late 2020.

== Global expansion ==
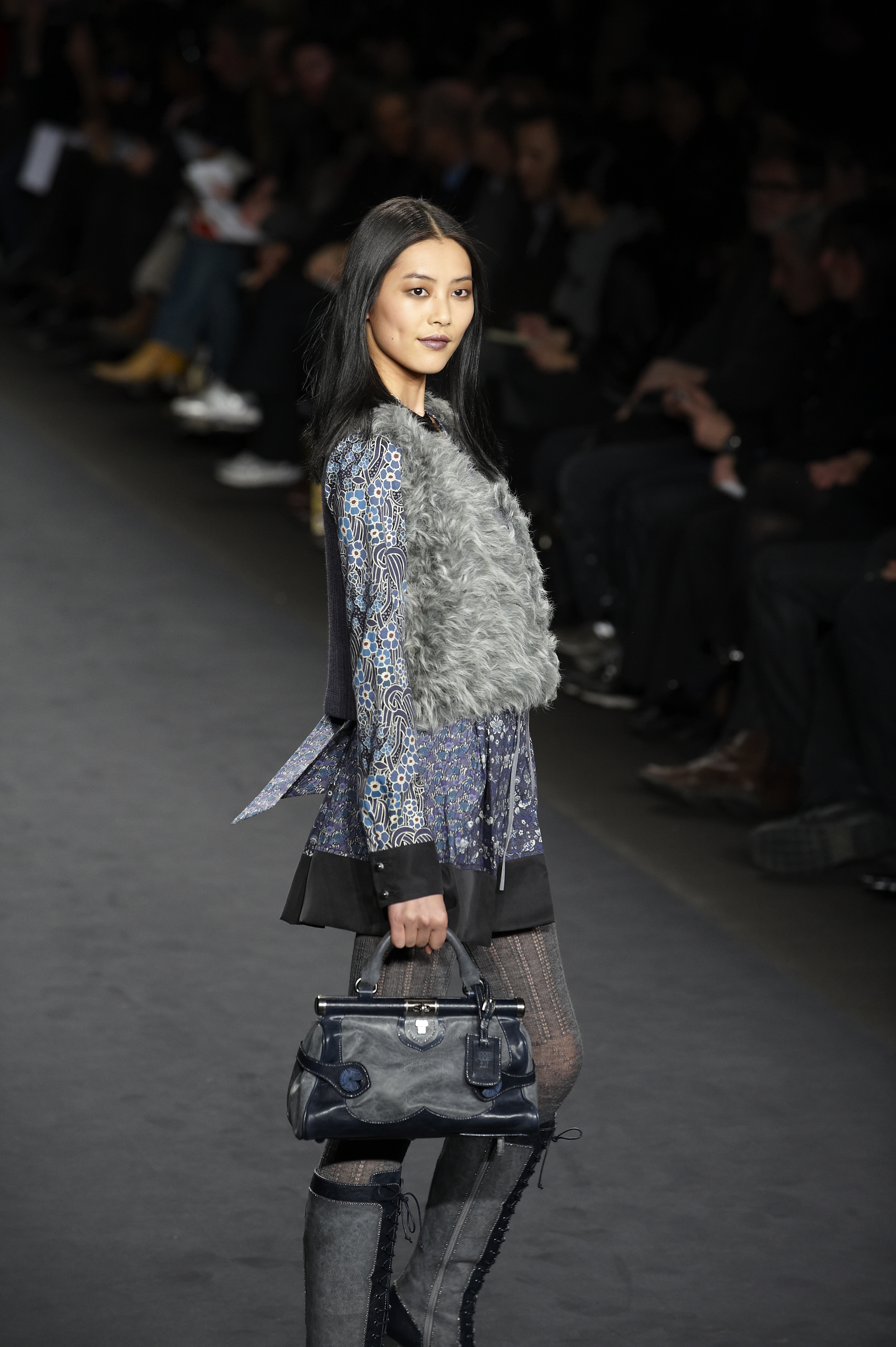
Liu Wen on the runway at Anna Sui Fall/Winter 2010

1997 marked one of the pivotal years in the emergence of Sui onto the world stage. The first freestanding Anna Sui boutiques opened in 1997 in Tokyo and Osaka through a distribution and sales license with Isetan. Sui also partnered with Italian shoemaker Ballin to create a shoe line. For the Spring/Summer 1997 fashion collection, Sui drew considerable media attention when Dave Navarro of the Red Hot Chili Peppers appeared on the runway for her show in lacy underwear. The same year, mannequin designer Ralph Pucci made full sized mannequins using her dolly heads. The mannequins were based on the measurements of model Michele Hicks and would later form the inspiration for Sui's first diffusion brand, Dolly Girl. The Fall/Winter collection, which took place at the Church of Divine Paternity, a gothic style church in Manhattan, was noted at the time for its infusion of whimsy and lightheartedness and its repudiation of the conspicuously dark undertones traditionally associated with gothic fashion.

In 1999, Anna Sui launched her fragrance, Anna Sui Classic, with Wella AG and cosmetics line with Albion.

In 2000, Sui launched a skincare line, also with Albion. The same year, her collections were featured as a part of the Fashion in Motion exhibition at London's Victoria & Albert Museum.

In 2003, the designer launched her Dolly Girl fragrance together with several limited edition sets in the Dolly Girl series. The same year, Wella AG was acquired by Procter & Gamble who continued the partnership. In 2003, Sui launched a long-term collaboration collection with Peruvian designer Ali Rapp called Ali Rapp for Anna Sui. The collaboration consists of ready to wear, handbags, fashion accessories, T-shirts and cloth dolls. Items have been featured in Sui's shows in 2008 and 2013.

== Specialized collaborations ==
In April 2004, the designer entered a collaboration with Dark Horse Comics and William Tucci designing the wardrobe for several of the main characters in Tucci's Shi: Ju-Nen, a miniseries in the hit comic Shi. Sui took the wardrobes from her Fall 2004 fashion collection, with items including yukata kimono minidresses and purple hose and high-heels. In October, Sui partnered with Gonzo K.K. Studios to design costumes for the characters in their 2004 television series Gankutsuou: The Count of Monte Cristo, a series loosely based on The Count of Monte Cristo by French author Alexandre Dumas.

In 2005, Sui was contracted by Samsung Electronics Co. in partnership with Vogue to design a Samsung SGH-E315 cell phone. The limited edition handset which was available through T-Mobile sold out in the first month with products occasionally coming for sale on eBay. Sui also partnered with Anthropologie to launch a fashion collection called Anna Sui for Anthropologie. The same year, Sui also entered into a 2-year deal with Victoria's Secret designing a lingerie line for the company.

In 2006, Anna Sui launched a limited edition Anna Sui Boho Barbie doll in partnership with Mattel. She later launched a limited edition collection with Victoria's Secret called Anna Sui for Victoria's Secret.

For the Hello Kitty 30th Anniversary in 2007, Sui partnered with the Japanese company to create a limited edition collection in tribute to the milestone. The stuffed animals from this collection sell for over US$100.00 on eBay. In November 2007, Sui followed up on the success of her US cell phone collaboration with the launch of the Dolly Girl by Anna Sui model fanfun. 815T cell phone in collaboration with Softbank Mobile which was distributed online in Japan.

In 2008, Sui launched the Dolly Girl clothing collection in Japan to follow-up on her previous fragrance lines. Later in 2008, Sui partnered with Nissan to design a customized car, the Nissan 350z Anna Sui Limited Edition which was featured at various roadshows.

In 2011, Sui collaborated with Google to create a themed Google Chrome web browser extension.

In November 2012, Sui and Albion partnered with UK online seller ASOS to launch a Fall/Winter 2013 Anna Sui Cosmetics line in Europe. The series featured a collaboration with Disney.

In April 2014, Sui returned to her native Detroit to partner with the Ford Motor Company in creating the Mustang Unleashed Collection celebrating the 50 year anniversary of the Ford Mustang. Later in April, Sui and Hong Kong based I.T. Apparels Ltd partnered with Lab Made, a Hong Kong ice cream vendor famous for pioneering the obscure market of liquid nitrogen ice cream to create an Anna Sui × Lab Made pop-up store which was featured at the company's Tsimshatsui branch throughout April 2014. The collaboration also featured Sui's own flavor of purple ice cream and the opening was announced by Hong Kong celebrity Alfred Hui, a contract artist for Hong Kong's Television Broadcasts Limited. In July, Sui launched a lingerie line in Korea with Alvin Korea Co. Ltd. which was launched with a full scale lingerie fashion show at the Ritz Carlton Hotel in Seoul. In October, Sui partnered with the CFDA to launch a collaboration with Best Buy called Anna Sui × Best Buy as a part of their designer's series.

In March 2015, Sui and Isetan partnered with Sailor Moon to launch the Sailor Moon × Anna Sui collection which was featured at the Isetan store in Shinjuku. Sui also partnered with French dessert maker Ladurée to create a collaboration called Anna Sui × Ladurée as a part of the Les Merveilleuses Ladurée collection.

In November 2015, the Starbucks × Anna Sui collection was announced, a holiday collaboration between the coffeehouse chain and the fashion designer.

In August 2016, the 20th anniversary of Sui's entry into the Japanese market, Anna Sui Japan launched Anna Sui Mag, an online Japanese language magazine and lifestyle blog. For Singapore's Golden Jubilee, Sui partnered with Uniform and Shentonista to create a commemorative SG50 tote featured in a blog series by Shentonista.

In January 2017, Sui collaborated with Kenner/Takara to launch Blythe Adores Anna doll collection. The collection released in Japan with a further 500 dolls being further released via international lottery. In 2019, as part of Barbie's 60th anniversary, 4 limited sets of dolls with outfits from Sui's Spring 2019 collection were released.

== Retail collaborations ==
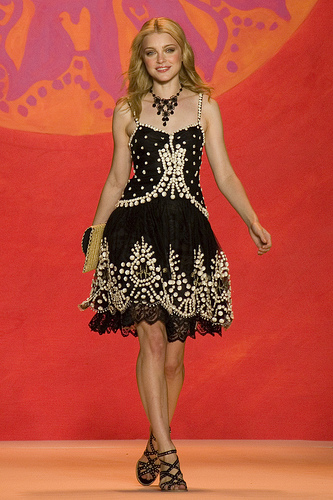
Jessica Stam walking the Anna Sui show in February 2009

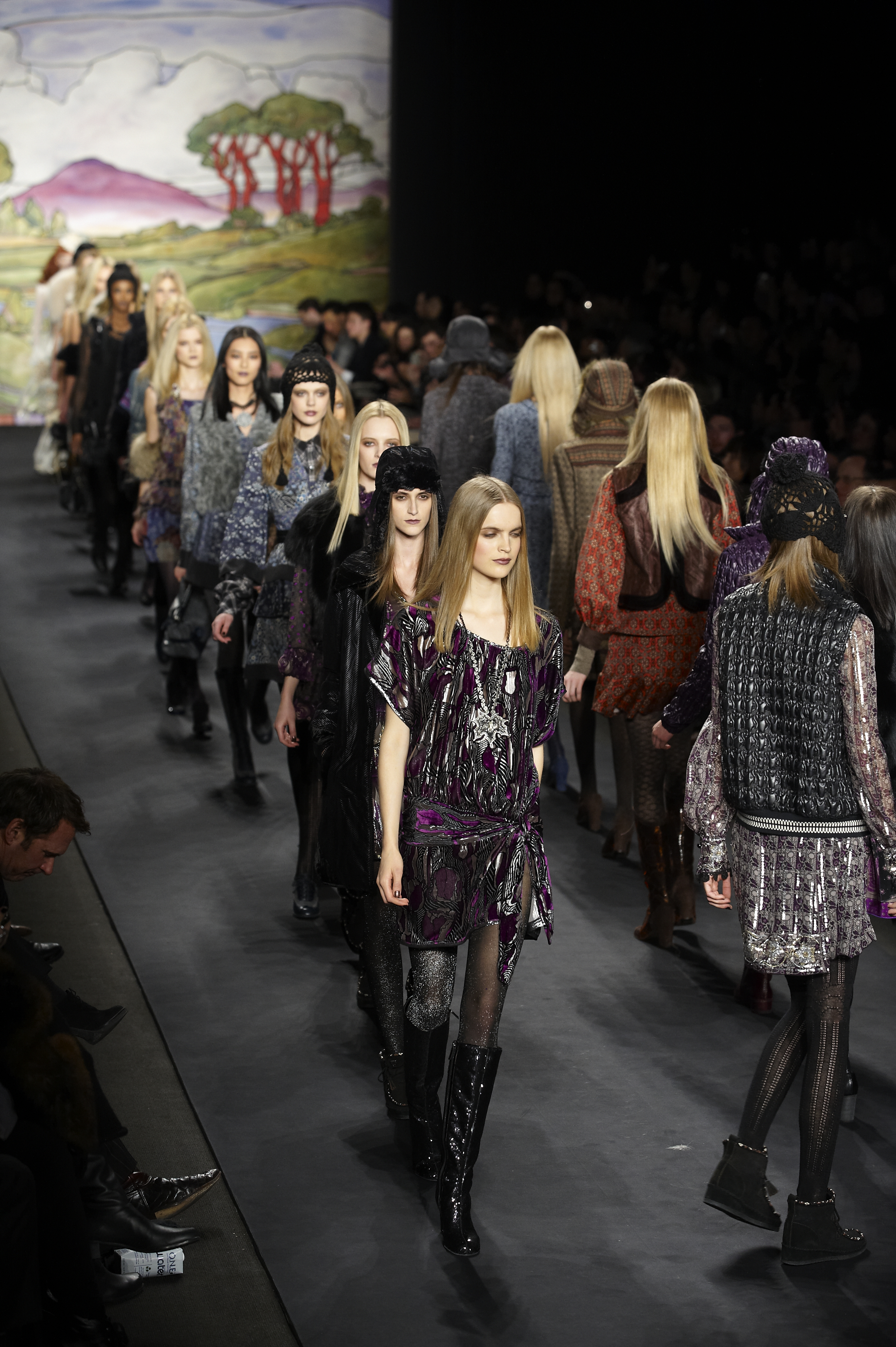
The model parade during Sui's Winter 2010 show

In 2009, Sui partnered with Target to produce a Gossip Girl inspired line combining Upper East Side style with a "downtown" edge called Anna Sui for Target. The limited edition collection, with affordable reworkings of pieces from her previous runway collections, was launched in September and sold in more than 800 stores and online.

In 2011, she partnered with Hush Puppies to create a limited edition shoe collection which debuted in the Fall 2011 fashion show. She went on to also partner with Tumi_Inc. to create a line of suitcases and travel items.

In 2012, Sui collaborated with Coach and created a handbag line called Anna Sui for Coach.

In February, 2014, Lee Min-ho announced the Anna Sui for Fila collection in Asia on behalf of Anta Sports Products and Fila China which launched in 2015. In April 2015, Sui partnered with O'Neill to launch the collaborative collection titled Anna Sui for O'Neill, a collection inspired by the California beach scene. In August, Sui partnered with American boot-maker The Frye Company to launch a limited edition collection titled Anna Sui × Frye, which expanded a previous collaboration between the two houses to develop boots for Sui's Fall/Winter 2015 fashion show. The collection was inspired by Nordic culture and History Channel's show Vikings.

In February 2016, Sui partnered with Opening Ceremony to collaborate on the label's "Year of China" Spring Summer 2016 collection which also featured brands like Renli Su, Ms Min and Vivienne Tam amongst others. For the collaboration, Sui and Opening Ceremony reissued pieces from Sui's 1993 and 1994 collections.

In July 2017, Sui teamed up with Macy's, the retailer that gave her her first big break more than 35 years earlier. The collection, Anna Sui X International Concepts, included both new versions of runway pieces, jewelry and shoes, as well as "Anna Sui Loves" approved items by Macy's own design team. In August, PBTeen launched Sui's collection, inspired by Art Nouveau and her own adolescent bedroom, with bedding, accessories such as rugs and lamps, and furniture.

In August 2018, Sui collaborated with online retailer Modcloth on an 8-dress capsule collection in extended sizes. The dresses used adapted silhouettes and prints from previous collections in new colorways.

== Recognition ==
In 1992, Sui won the CFDA Perry Ellis award for new talent.

In 2009, Sui was presented with the Classic Icon of Fashion Design award at the China Fashion Awards in Beijing and with the CFDA's Geoffrey Beene Lifetime Achievement Award in her native New York City.

In 2010, Sui collaborated with Andrew Bolton to publish a book chronicling her 20-year career. Later in the year, she launched her Forbidden Affair fragrance.

In April, Sui attended the Identities 2011 fashion show at Harvard College where she spoke to the students and was honored with the program's Leadership of the Arts Award.

From May to November 2013, clothing from Sui's 1999 and 2000 collections were featured at the Museum at the Fashion Institute of Technology as a part of their RetroSpective: Fashion & Textile History Gallery exhibition.

In June 2016, a historical retrospective of Sui's designs displayed at the Beijing SKP department store. The collection featured Anna Sui designed items and outfits dating from Sui's first show in 1991 through her 2016 collections.

In May 2017, London's Fashion and Textile Museum debuted an Anna Sui exhibition titled The World of Anna Sui. The exhibition marks the first ever museum retrospective in the United Kingdom featuring an American fashion designer and the first time Sui has been the sole subject of a museum exposition. The exhibition announcement coincided with the announcement of a new book on Sui's career by The Business of Fashion's Editor-at-Large, Tim Blanks. The Anna Sui X INC International Concepts collection for Macy's was announced for September 2017 featuring model Karen Elson.

== Reception ==
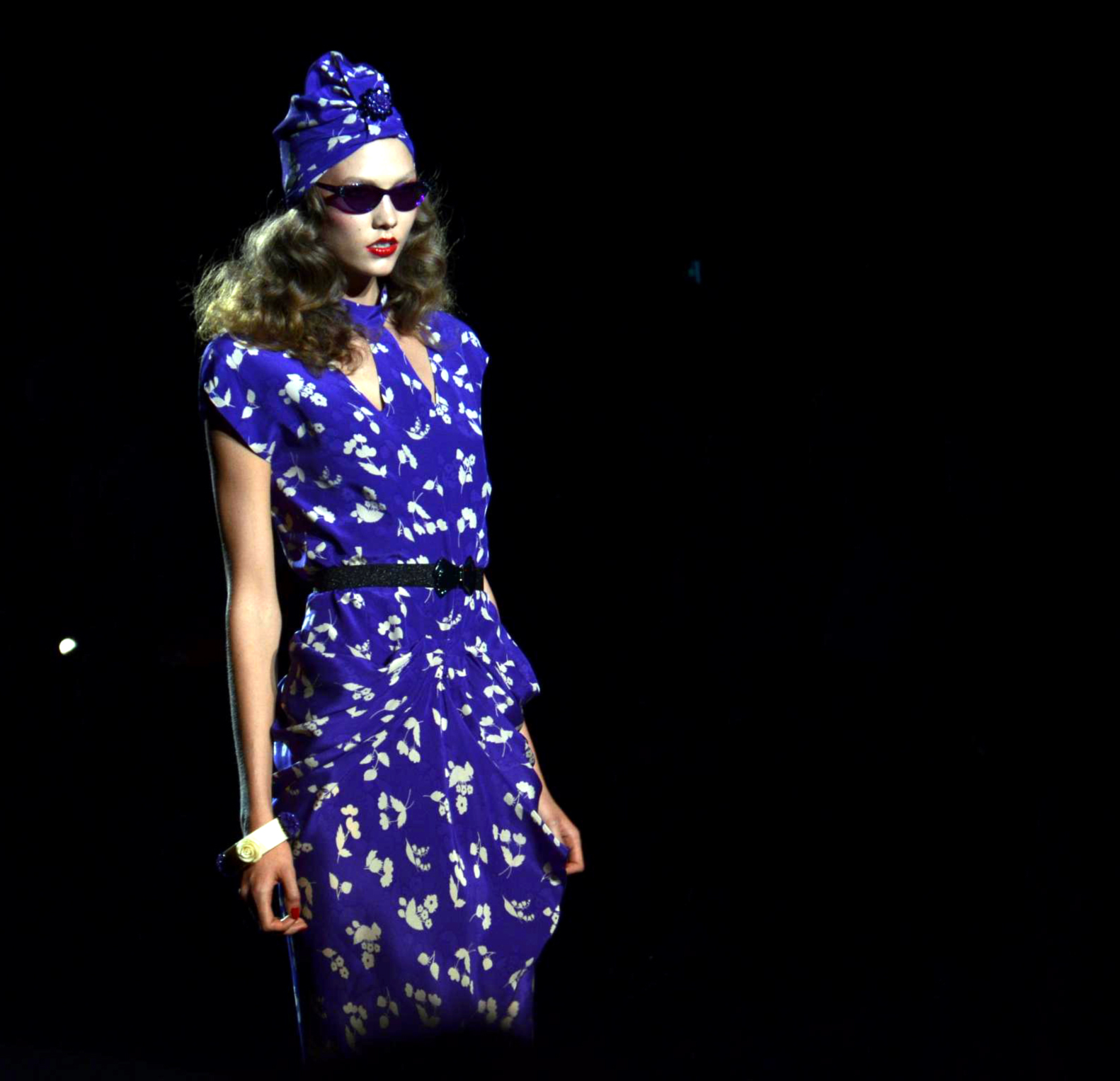
Karlie Kloss on the runway at the Anna Sui show in September 2011

For her innovative work, Sui has been called a designer who "never panders" by The New York Times, and earned the distinction of being named to Time magazine's list of the decade's top five fashion icons. Sui's work has been extensively covered both by the journalist industry as a whole and by the fashion press in particular. Her seasonal shows are regularly covered by Vogue, Style.com, Women's Wear Daily and many other news and editorial platforms. In general, the ambiance created in the designer's shows is particularly well received with the media commenting on details such as the anticipation surrounding the soundtracks to the playful and lighthearted environment. Mercedes-Benz Fashion Week called Sui's career "a classic American success story," quoting Sui's determined attitude: "You have to focus on your dreams, even if they go beyond common sense. How could this young girl from the suburbs of Detroit become a success in New York? It was always that dream." Reviews generally refer to the thoroughness of the designer's research and her tying together of various trends and topics both historical and current.

== Charity and community involvement ==
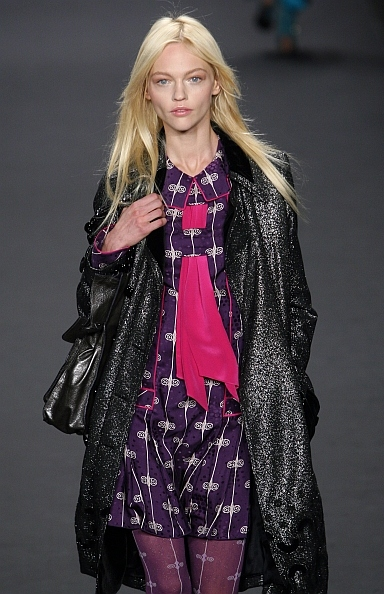
Sasha Pivovarova at the Anna Sui show in February 2008

In 1996, Sui partnered with General Motors Corporation as a part of the GM/CFDA Concept: Cure collaboration between General Motors and various fashion industry companies, raising awareness about and raising research funds for breast cancer. As a part of the program, Sui designed a GMC Yukon which was sold at silent auction to raise funds.

Following the September 11th attacks in 2001 on New York City's World Trade Center, Sui worked with actor Ellen Barkin designing an outfit to raise funds to benefit the Leary Firefighters Foundation and the firefighters who perished in the response.

Sui designs and manufactures her signature collection in her New York City headquarters on Fashion Avenue and has been an advocate of her Made in USA approach. In addition to her work as a designer, Sui has ardently fought to keep the industry alive and has spearheaded a campaign to "Save the Garment Center," which was highlighted during Fashion Week in September 2008.

Following the 2008 Mumbai attacks, Sui put several of her designs up for auction on eBay, donating the proceeds to Citizens for Justice and Peace, a Mumbai-based civil-rights organization.

In 2010, Sui partnered with Isetan and Bearbrick in a charity event benefitting the World Wildlife Foundation and Malaysia's Forest Restoration and Orang-utan Monitoring Project, with proceeds from a limited edition collection going to the cause.

In March 2011, following the Tōhoku earthquake and tsunami that devastated Japan, Sui designed and sold shirts in lavender and black printed with the words Japan, We're All in This Together. All proceeds were turned over to the Japan Disaster Relief Fund.

In 2012, Sui worked with musician and friend Jack White to design uniforms for employees at White's Third Man Records retail store which opened in Nashville in November 2012. A second location also opened in Detroit's Cass Corridor in November 2015 also featuring Sui's uniform dresses.

In September 2014, in celebration of the 75th Anniversary of the 1939 film The Wizard of Oz, Warner Bros. and the Tonner Doll Company organized the creation of a collection of commemorative dolls designed by several famous American designers including Marc Jacobs, Donna Karan, Charlotte Ronson, Trina Turk and Sui. The collection of dolls was exhibited at the Fashion Institute of Technology and Bloomingdale's between September and October 2014 before being auctioned on eBay Giving Works with proceeds going to Habitat for Humanity's There's No Place Like Home campaign.

In June 2015, Sui partnered with New York restaurant Serendipity 3 in a charity fundraiser to celebrate the restaurant's 60 year anniversary benefiting the Bowery Mission, a rescue mission and shelter in the Bowery area of Manhattan.

Sui regularly gives lectures to students and around the United States to inspire future generations to pursue their dreams. In October 2015, Sui spoke to local students about her experiences at the Michigan Theater in Ann Arbor as a part of the University of Michigan's Penny Stamps Speaker Series hosted by the Stamps School of Art and Design. Sui emphasized the need to not be intimidated by the industry which is sometimes described as cutthroat, even recounting her experiences from when she had been fired from a position at a sportswear company early in her career. Following the lecture, some of Sui's designs went on display as part of the Detroit Historical Museum's Booth-Wilkinson Gallery exhibition Fashion D.Fined: The Past, Present and Future of Detroit Fashion.

In January 2017, Sui showcased a pair of Vans shoes she designed to benefit the Vans Custom Culture competition, an annual campaign by Vans raising funds and awareness for high school art programs.

== Lines ==
Anna Sui Shoes, manufactured in Venice, Italy, premiered on the runway for the fall collection in 1994. Later, Sui began production of a diffusion fashion line called "Sui by Anna Sui" and a jeans line called "Anna Sui Jeans" with Italian fashion house Gilmar S.p.A. The same year, Sui and Marc Jacobs also began consulting for Gilmar's Cento x Cento and Iceberg brand lines respectively.

=== Accessories ===
In 1997, Sui entered into a partnership with Isetan to create a fashion accessories line. The line is distributed by Mammina in Japan and present in the United States, Korea, Hong Kong, China and Taiwan.

=== Cosmetics ===
The Anna Sui Cosmetics line launched in 1999 with Albion Cosmetics, a Japanese cosmetic brand and production company, following a distribution sales agreement with ISETAN. Ltd. An Anna Sui Skincare line, similarly with Albion followed this up in 2000. The cosmetics line releases two seasonal collections per year based on the fashion cycle. The cosmetics line covers various categories including base and makeup, eyes, lips, nails, skincare, hair and body, and cosmetics accessories.

In 2010, Anna Sui Cosmetics announced Park Min Young as the brand's key opinion leader in South Korea.

In October 2016, Anna Sui Cosmetics and Nylon Japan launched a Halloween collaboration called Anna Sui × Nylon: Halloween Makeup Room at MODI in Shibuya. In August the same year, Sui released her Autumn 2016 collection called Mysterious Fairy Tale.

In July, 2017, Sui collaborated with the store that gave her her first big break, Macy's with Anna Sui X Inc International Concepts. The collection featured reeditions of recent collection items at prices of about a quarter of her collection pieces, plus jewelry and shoes.

The following is an incomplete list of Anna Sui's Cosmetics collections:

Year/Season	Collection	Partners	Notes	Model
Spring 2007	Glamour Meets Retro: Art Deco Girl	Albion Cosmetics	Global Seasonal collection	Lily Cole
Autumn 2007	Glamour Meets Retro: Art Deco Girl	Albion Cosmetics	Global Seasonal collection	Lily Cole
Autumn 2009	Asia Collection	Albion Cosmetics	Asian Seasonal collection	Agyness Deyn
Spring 2010	Asia Collection	Albion Cosmetics	Asian Seasonal Collection	Agyness Deyn
Autumn 2010	Kaleidoscope of Color	Albion Cosmetics	Global Seasonal Collection	Frida Gustavsson
Autumn 2010	Asia Collection	Albion Cosmetics	Asian Seasonal Collection	Agyness Deyn
Spring 2011		Albion Cosmetics	Global Seasonal Collection	Frida Gustavsson
Autumn 2011		Albion Cosmetics	Global Seasonal Collection	Frida Gustavsson
Spring 2012		Albion Cosmetics	Global Seasonal Collection	Frida Gustavsson
Autumn 2012	Rebel Girl	Albion Cosmetics	Global Seasonal Collection	Chrystal Copland
2013	Anna Sui Beauty 2013	Albion Cosmetics	Global Annual Collection	Chrystal Copland
Spring 2013	Drama Queen	Albion Cosmetics	Global Seasonal Collection	Chrystal Copland
Spring 2015		Albion Cosmetics	Global Seasonal Collection	Ine Neefs
Autumn 2015		Albion Cosmetics	Global Seasonal Collection	Ine Neefs
Spring 2016		Albion Cosmetics	Global Seasonal Collection	Maartje Verhoef
Autumn 2016	Mysterious Fairy Tale	Albion Cosmetics	Global Seasonal Collection	
October 2016	Anna Sui x Nylon: Halloween Style	Albion Cosmetics	Japanese Non Seasonal Collection	Nairu Yamamoto, Amy, Shinjyu Ried

=== Fashion ===
Sui has done two seasonal Fashion Week runway shows every year since 1991 with the exception of the Spring/Summer 2002 show, which was held in her Garment District studio due to the September 11 attacks on the Twin Towers. Design and production takes place in New York City's Garment Center. The designer also has produced two seasonal Japanese collections since 1997 based on the global collections and a Resort collection since 2007. In addition to the seasonal shows, Sui also has partnered with a variety of brands and companies such as Hush Puppies, Target Corporation, Ford Motor Company, Tumi, Isetan, Fila, O'Neill, Samsung, Mattel, Coach, T-Mobile, Victoria's Secret, Pottery Barn and Vogue to produce limited edition collections.

In 1997, Sui began a partnership with Isetan Mitsukoshi covering Sui's fashion label in Japan.

In April 2016, the Anna Sui Japan Spring/Summer 16 show was premiered in Tokyo to kick off the collection's launch with much fanfare in celebration of the designer's 20th Anniversary in Japan.

The following is an incomplete list of Sui's fashion shows and collections:

Collection	Date	Event	Location	Theme
Anna Sui 1991	1991	Press Week of New York	Unknown	Unknown
Anna Sui Winter 1991	1991	Press Week of New York	Unknown	Swinging Sixties London
Anna Sui Spring 1992	1991	Press Week of New York	Unknown	Barbie
Anna Sui Fall 1992	1992	Press Week of New York	Unknown	Swinging Sixties London
Anna Sui Spring 1993	1992	New York Fashion Week	Bryant Park	London Grunge
Anna Sui Fall 1993	1993	New York Fashion Week	Bryant Park	Charles Baudelaire
Anna Sui Spring 1994	1993	New York Fashion Week	Bryant Park	Grunge
Anna Sui Fall 1994	1994	New York Fashion Week	Bryant Park	Chanel, Balenciaga, and McCardell
Anna Sui Spring 1995	1994	New York Fashion Week	Bryant Park	1970s Funk
Anna Sui Fall 1995	1995	New York Fashion Week	Bryant Park	1940s and 1960s
Anna Sui Spring 1996	1995	New York Fashion Week	Bryant Park	Preppie
Anna Sui Fall 1996	1996	New York Fashion Week	Bryant Park	1920s British Vogue and 1970s Twig
Anna Sui Spring 1997	1996	New York Fashion Week	Bryant Park	Hippie
Anna Sui Fall 1997	1997	New York Fashion Week	Bryant Park	Leicester Square
Anna Sui Spring 1998	1997	New York Fashion Week	Bryant Park	Surfer
Anna Sui Fall 1998	1998	New York Fashion Week	Bryant Park	Fairytale
Anna Sui Spring 1999	1998	New York Fashion Week	Bryant Park	Euro/English
Anna Sui Fall 1999	1999	New York Fashion Week	Bryant Park	Technicolor, golden age cinema
Anna Sui Spring 2000	1999	New York Fashion Week	Bryant Park	India/Rococo Gypsy
Anna Sui Fall 2000	2000	New York Fashion Week	Bryant Park	hippie-chic
Anna Sui Spring 2001	2000	New York Fashion Week	Bryant Park	Mudd Club/Grunge
Anna Sui Fall 2001	2001	New York Fashion Week	Bryant Park	The Factory (Warhol)
Anna Sui Spring 2002	2001	No runway show; small studio presentation due to 9/11	N/A	N/A
Anna Sui Fall 2002	2002	New York Fashion Week	Bryant Park	Fairy Tale
Anna Sui Spring 2003	2002	New York Fashion Week	Bryant Park	Sport
Anna Sui Fall 2003	2003	New York Fashion Week	Bryant Park	London boutique Biba
Anna Sui Spring 2004	2003	New York Fashion Week	Bryant Park	teenage surfer girl
Anna Sui Fall 2004	2004	New York Fashion Week	Bryant Park	60s London
Anna Sui Spring 2005	2004	New York Fashion Week	Bryant Park	Wild West
Anna Sui Fall 2005	2005	New York Fashion Week	Bryant Park	Louise Nevelson/Junk Art
Anna Sui Spring 2006	2005	New York Fashion Week	Bryant Park	Gazette du Bon Ton
Anna Sui Fall 2006	2006	New York Fashion Week	Bryant Park	60s chic
Anna Sui Spring 2007	2006	Mercedes-Benz Fashion Week	Bryant Park	The New York Dolls/Marie Antoinette/Suleiman the Magnificent
Anna Sui Fall 2007	2007	Mercedes-Benz Fashion Week	Bryant Park	Pre-pop
Anna Sui Resort 2008	2007	Unknown	Unknown	Ossie Clark
Anna Sui Spring 2008	2007	Mercedes-Benz Fashion Week	Bryant Park	Busby Berkeley/Biba
Anna Sui Fall 2008	2008	Mercedes-Benz Fashion Week	Bryant Park	Pre-Raphaelite/Medievalism/Gustav Klimt/American Indians
Anna Sui Resort 2009	2008	Unknown	Unknown	Psychedelia
Anna Sui Spring 2009	2008	Mercedes-Benz Fashion Week	Bryant Park	Spanish toreador
Anna Sui Fall 2009	2009	Mercedes-Benz Fashion Week	Bryant Park	1890s
Anna Sui Resort 2010	2009	Unknown	Unknown	Sundress
Anna Sui for Target	2009	Collection Launch	USA	Gossip Girl
Anna Sui Spring 2010	2009	Mercedes-Benz Fashion Week	Bryant Park	Spring Fling
Anna Sui Fall 2010	2010	Mercedes-Benz Fashion Week	Bryant Park	American Arts and Crafts Movement
Anna Sui Resort 2011	2010	Unknown	Unknown	romantic and dreamy
Anna Sui Spring 2011	2010	Mercedes-Benz Fashion Week	Bryant Park	Pioneer/60s L.A.
Anna Sui Fall 2011	2011	Mercedes-Benz Fashion Week	Bryant Park	Ormsby-Gore sisters, Ballets Russes
Anna Sui Resort 2012	2011	Unknown	Unknown	David Hicks' Paris shop
Anna Sui Spring 2012	2011	Mercedes-Benz Fashion Week	Bryant Park	Antonio Lopez/Club Sept/Paris 1970s
Anna Sui for Tumi 2012	2013	Collection Launch	Global	Luggage Sets
Anna Sui for Hush Puppies	2012	Collection Launch	Global	Vintage and Rock
Anna Sui Fall 2012	2012	Mercedes-Benz Fashion Week	Bryant Park	fantasy/textile design
Anna Sui Resort 2013	2012	Unknown	Unknown	Art Nouveau
Anna Sui for Coach	2012	Collection Launch	Global	Art Nouveau
Anna Sui Spring 2013	2012	Mercedes-Benz Fashion Week	Bryant Park	London/New York Punk/Second French Empire
Anna Sui Fall 2013	2013	Mercedes-Benz Fashion Week (Fall)	Lincoln Center	'60s nostalgia/French New Wave Cinema
Anna Sui Resort 2014	2013	Unknown	Unknown	Boho-chic
Anna Sui for Tumi 2013	2013	Collection Launch	Global	Luggage Sets
Anna Sui Spring 2014	2013	Mercedes-Benz Fashion Week (Spring)	Lincoln Center	Pre-Raphaelite
Anna Sui Fall 2014	2014	Mercedes-Benz Fashion Week (Fall)	Lincoln Center	1920s Art Deco
Anna Sui Resort 2015	2014	Unknown	Unknown	Art Deco
Anna Sui for FILA	2014	Collection Launch	Asia	Sportswear
Mustang Unleashed Collection	2014	Collection Launch	Global	Vintage
Anna Sui Spring 2015	2014	Mercedes-Benz Fashion Week (Spring)	Lincoln Center	Retro 70s prints
Anna Sui Fall 2015	2015	Mercedes-Benz Fashion Week (Fall)	Lincoln Center	Vikings
Anna Sui Resort 2016	2015	Unknown	Unknown	'70s boho
Anna Sui for O'Neill	2015	Collection Launch	Global	Beach-Ready
Anna Sui × Frye	2015	Collection Launch	USA	Footwear
Anna Sui × Sailor Moon	2015	Collection Launch	Japan	Collectibles
Anna Sui × Starbucks	2015	Collection Launch	Asia	Holiday Collectibles
Anna Sui Spring 2016	2015	Mercedes-Benz Fashion Week (Spring)	Skylight at Moynihan Station	exotic Polynesia
Anna Sui Fall 2016	2016	Mercedes-Benz Fashion Week (Fall)	Skylight at Moynihan Station	Peter Blake, Niki de Saint Phalle, Barbara Hulanicki
Anna Sui Resort 2017	2016	Unknown	Unknown	90's Grunge
Anna Sui Spring 2017	2016	Mercedes-Benz Fashion Week (Spring)	Skylight at Moynihan Station	Miss American Pie
Anna Sui Fall 2017	2017	Mercedes-Benz Fashion Week (Fall)	Skylight Clarkson Square	Elsa Schiaparelli, Elsie de Wolfe, Dorothy di Frasso, Blithe Spirit

=== Footwear ===
In 1994, Sui launched Anna Sui Footwear through a partnership with Italian shoemaker Ballin with design taking place in New York and production in Venice, Italy. Her design style became widely available as part of a multi-designer capsule, when she customized Candie's platform heels in the 1990s.

Since 2009, Sui has collaborated with British ergonomic footwear company FitFlop to produce a shoe line called Anna Sui x FitFlop, comprising multiple collections.

In September 2016, the Anna Sui Loves FitFlop collection was launched. Product design was based on Sui's Spring/Summer 2016 fashion collection and the designer's Tahitian heritage. It is distributed globally by FitFlop to Indonesia, Ireland, Malaysia, Netherlands, Philippines, Singapore, Taiwan, Thailand, US, UK and Vietnam. Sui has also collaborated with and featured footwear on her runways from such designers as John Fleuvog, Terry De Havilland, Emma Hope, Bed Stu, and Teva.

=== Fragrance ===
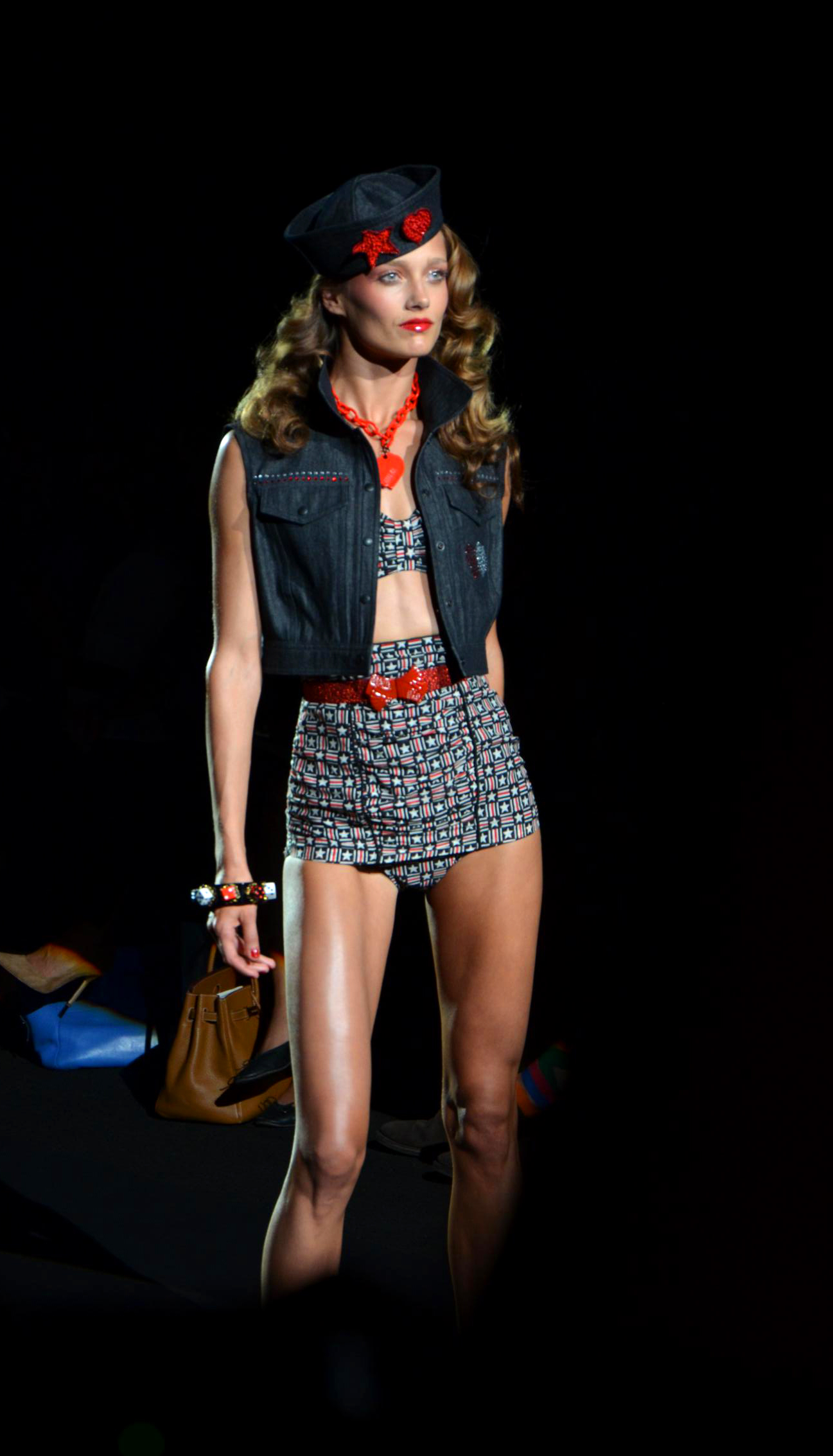
Karmen Pedaru at the Anna Sui show in November 2011

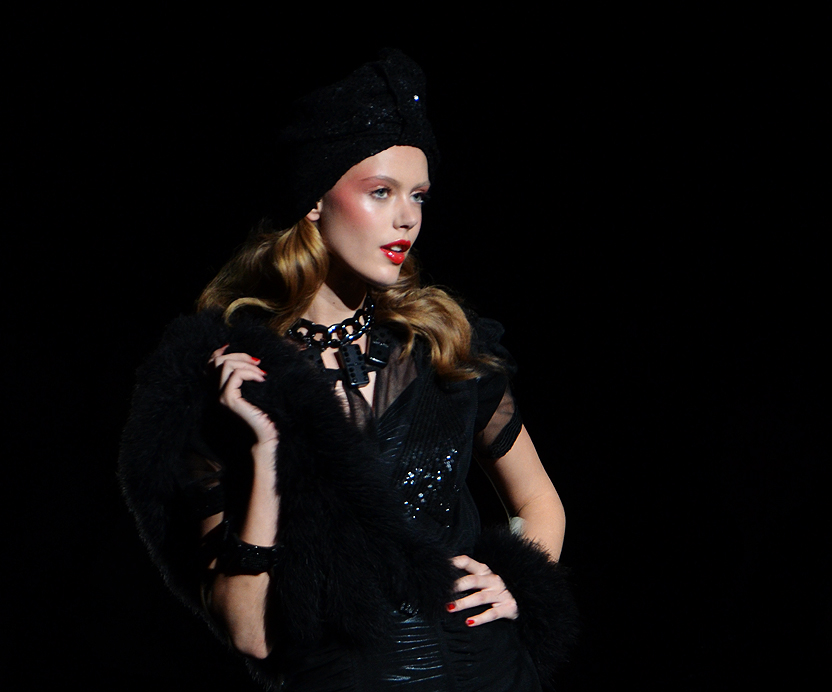
Frida Gustavsson on the runway in November 2011

Sui introduced her fragrance and line in 1999 with Wella AG, to date the designer has launched a variety of cosmetic items and 30 individual fragrance products with most coming in different sizes. The designer's current fragrance license is with French company Inter Parfums and generally releases two hero fragrances per year. In 2011, She also entered into a fragrance license with Interparfums for fragrance and perfume distribution.

The following is a list of Sui's fragrance collections:

Year	Fragrance	Partner	Notes	Perfumer
1999	Anna Sui Classic	Wella AG		Jacques Huclier
2000	Sui Dreams	Wella AG	Part of the Sui Dreams Collection	Philippe Romano
2002	Sui Love	Wella AG		Jean-Louis Grauby
2003	Dolly Girl	Wella AG/Procter & Gamble	Part of the Dolly Girl Collection	Benoist Lapouza
2004	Dolly Girl Ooh La Love	Procter & Gamble	Part of the Dolly Girl Collection	Frank Voelkl
2005	Secret Wish	Procter & Gamble	Part of the Secret Wish Collection	Michel Almairac
2006	Dolly Girl On The Beach	Procter & Gamble	Part of the Dolly Girl Collection	
2006	Secret Wish Magic Romance	Procter & Gamble	Part of the Secret Wish Collection	
2007	Dolly Girl Bonjour L'Amour	Procter & Gamble	Part of the Dolly Girl Collection	
2007	Flight of Fancy	Procter & Gamble	Part of the Fancy Collection	
2008	Dolly Girl Lil' Starlet	Procter & Gamble	Part of the Dolly Girl Collection	
2008	Night of Fancy	Procter & Gamble	Part of the Fancy Collection	
2009	Live Your Dream	Procter & Gamble		
2009	Rock Me!	Procter & Gamble	Part of the Rock Me Collection	
2010	Forbidden Affair	Procter & Gamble		
2010	Rock Me! Summer of Love	Procter & Gamble	Part of the Rock Me Collection	
2012	Secret Wish Fairy Dance	Inter Parfums		
2013	La Vie de Bohème	Inter Parfums	Part of the Bohème Collection	Philippe Romano
2013	Tin House Fairy Dance	Inter Parfums	Part of the Tin House Collection	
2013	Tin House Flight of Fancy	Inter Parfums	Part of the Tin House Collection	
2013	Tin House Forbidden Affair	Inter Parfums	Part of the Tin House Collection	
2013	Tin House Secret Wish	Inter Parfums	Part of the Tin House Collection	
2014	La Nuit de Bohème	Inter Parfums	Part of the Bohème Collection	Jérome Epinette; Michel Almairac
2014	La Nuit de Bohème Eau de Parfum	Inter Parfums	Part of the Bohème Collection	Philippe Romano
2014	Sui Dreams in Pink	Inter Parfums	Part of the Sui Dreams Collection	Claudette Belnavis
2015	Romantica	Inter Parfums	Part of the Romantica Collection	Steven DeMercado
2015	Sui Dreams in Green	Inter Parfums	Part of the Sui Dreams Collection	Pierre Negrin
2016	Sui Dreams in Yellow	Inter Parfums	Part of the Sui Dreams Collection	
2016	Lucky Wish	Inter Parfums	Part of the Secret Wish Collection	Mathieu Nardin
2016	Romantica Exotica	Inter Parfums	Part of the Romantica Collection	Jerome Epinette
2016	L'Amour Rose	Inter Parfums		
2017	Fantasia	Inter Parfums		
2017	L'Amour Rose Versailles Eau de Toilette	Inter Parfums		
2017	L'Amour Rose Versailles Eau de Parfum	Inter Parfums		

=== Vision ===
In 2009, Sui launched Anna Sui Vision with Mondottica Limited for manufacture and distribution of spectacles and sunglasses as Anna Sui Eyewear. The distribution agreement with Mondottica for eyewear distribution was under the Anna Sui Eyewear brand and launched a collaboration collection with Bliss called Anna Sui for FitFlop. In 2012, the designer worked on a collaboration between Mondottica and Fellow Earthlings to produce sunglasses for Sui's fashion shows

In 2016, Sui introduced a contact lens line under the agreement distributed in Hong Kong, Macau, Singapore, South Korea and Taiwan.

=== Bridge lines ===
==== Anna Sui Jeans ====
Anna Sui Jeans was a bridge line launched in 1994 by the designer and Italian fashion company Gilmar S.P.A. The Italian company was also involved in collaborating on the designer's main Anna Sui line and Sui had been designing and consulting for several Gilmar brands including Cento X Cento together with Marc Jacobs. Sui collaborated on branding for the line with New York artist Michael Economy and the collaboration with Gilmar lasted until 2004.

==== Anna Sui Mini ====
"Anna Sui Mini" debuted in early 2009 in Japan in a partnership with Isetan and Narumiya International with a line for babies, toddlers and children. The line is distributed in Japan through 25 stores, at Isetan and Mitsukoshi department stores and through online sales.

==== Dolly Girl by Anna Sui ====
The dolly heads that were symbols of Sui's fashion style would later form the inspiration for what would become Dolly Girl. In 2003, Sui released a Dolly Girl perfume, later expanded to an entire fragrance collection with several variations. In 2008, the Dolly Girl by Anna Sui clothing line was formally launched in Japan in partnership with Isetan and Onward Kashiyama to further develop and produce the concept. Sui collaborated with art director Michael Economy on the line's branding elements.

The brand line is sold in over 50 standalone stores throughout Japan and focuses on fashion and fashion accessories. There are typically 3 seasonal collection releases and combined with additional smaller monthly collections.

The brand launched two Winter 2015-16 collections titled "Fantasy Folklore" and "Glitter in the Woods" featuring models Sam Laskey and Julia Belyakova respectively with both collections drawing inspiration from fairy tales and 70's style folklore.

In 2016, Dolly Girl by Anna Sui launched its Summer 2016 collection titled "Colorful Paradise" and a follow-up called "Mexican Dolls." The collections explored the colorful indigenous clothing found in Mexican states such as Chiapas and the State of Mexico and included Sui's take on traditional Mexican fashion items such as serapes, rebozos and even traditional Aztec huipils. For the celebration of the designer's 20th anniversary in Japan, Sui released a special edition collection titled "Happy Dolly Girl Land." The collection featured carnival-inspired motifs and patterns infused into the clothing design. Late in the year, the Winter 2016-17 collection was released, titled "Into the Night Forest" with inspiration taken from fairy tales and visuals featuring full-scale layered paper models.

==== Sui by Anna Sui ====
Sui by Anna Sui was the designer's second bridge line launched in close proximity with her Jeans line together with Gilmar S.P.A. in 1994. The Sui by Anna Sui line and her jeans line continued under operation after the designer left her designer job at Gilmar's Cento X Cento. The line focused on sportswear for men and women with Sui directly controlling branding and design and was distributed globally by Gilmar. Sui relaunched her diffusion line in 2019.

==== The Souvenir Shop Anna Sui ====
In March 2016, Isetan Mitsukoshi Holdings and its subsidiary Mammina announced the launch of new brand partnership with Anna Sui Corp called The Souvenir Shop Anna Sui which covers travel retail items and fashion accessories. The line is sold in locations throughout Japan including airports, significant because it marks the first time Anna Sui fashion accessories were available as duty-free products and online via Isetan and Mitsukoshi. The collaboration features 70 new stores and boutiques and taps into the travel retail market. Stores launched in downtown areas and at airports marking the first time Anna Sui fashion products were available as duty free goods.

== In print ==
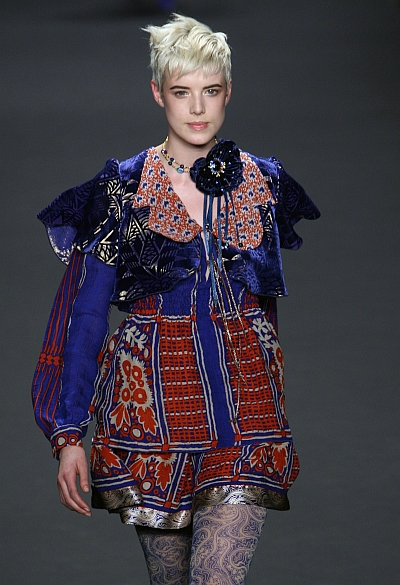
Agyness Deyn walks the Anna Sui show in February 2008.

=== Publications ===
- Muaddi Darraj, Susan (May 1, 2013). Anna Sui. New York: Infobase Publishing. ISBN 9781438144917.
- Bolton, Andrew (May 7, 2013). Sui, Anna; White, Jack; Meisel, Steven (eds.). Anna Sui. New York: Chronicle Books. ISBN 978-1452128597 – via Google Books.
- Blanks, Tim (May 30, 2017). The World of Anna Sui. New York: Abrahams. ISBN 978-1-4197-2418-3 – via Google Books.

=== E-Mooks (Japan) ===
- Isetan (February 15, 2008). Sui, Anna; Chigira, Keiko (eds.). Anna Sui が発信するコスメティック We Love Anna Sui (in Japanese). Tokyo: Takarajimasha Inc. ISBN 978-4-8002-4385-0.
- Isetan (2011). Sui, Anna (ed.). Anna Sui: 15th Happy Anniversary in Japan (in Japanese). Tokyo: Takarajimasha Inc. ISBN 978-4-7966-8014-1.
- Isetan (August 27, 2015). Sui, Anna (ed.). アナスイ: 日本上陸20周年記念 Anna Sui 20th Anniversary!: Thanks To Japan! (in Japanese). Vol. 1. Tokyo: Takarajimasha Inc. ISBN 978-4-8002-4385-0.
- Isetan (November 12, 2015). Sui, Anna (ed.). アナスイ: 日本上陸20周年記念 Anna Sui 20th Anniversary!: Anna As A Designer (in Japanese). Vol. 2. Tokyo: Takarajimasha Inc. ISBN 978-4-8002-4388-1.
- Isetan (February 23, 2016). Sui, Anna (ed.). アナスイ: 日本上陸20周年記念 Anna Sui 20th Anniversary!: Happy Celebration (in Japanese). Vol. 3. Tokyo: Takarajimasha Inc. ISBN 978-4-8002-4390-4.
- Isetan (May 26, 2016). Sui, Anna (ed.). アナスイ: 日本上陸20周年記念 Anna Sui 20th Anniversary!: Anna's Amazing Collection (in Japanese). Vol. 4. Tokyo: Takarajimasha Inc. ISBN 978-4-8002-4407-9.
- Isetan (August 25, 2016). Sui, Anna (ed.). アナスイ: 日本上陸20周年記念 Anna Sui 20th Anniversary!: "Pop-sydelic" world (in Japanese). Vol. 5. Tokyo: Takarajimasha Inc. ISBN 978-4-8002-4409-3.

=== Filmography ===
- Bolton, Andrew; Sui, Anna; Chen, Eva; Rocero, Geena; Gumpert, Lynn (June 2015). Asian American Life (Video). New York City: City University Television (CUNY-TV) – via MuckRack.com.

== In popular culture ==
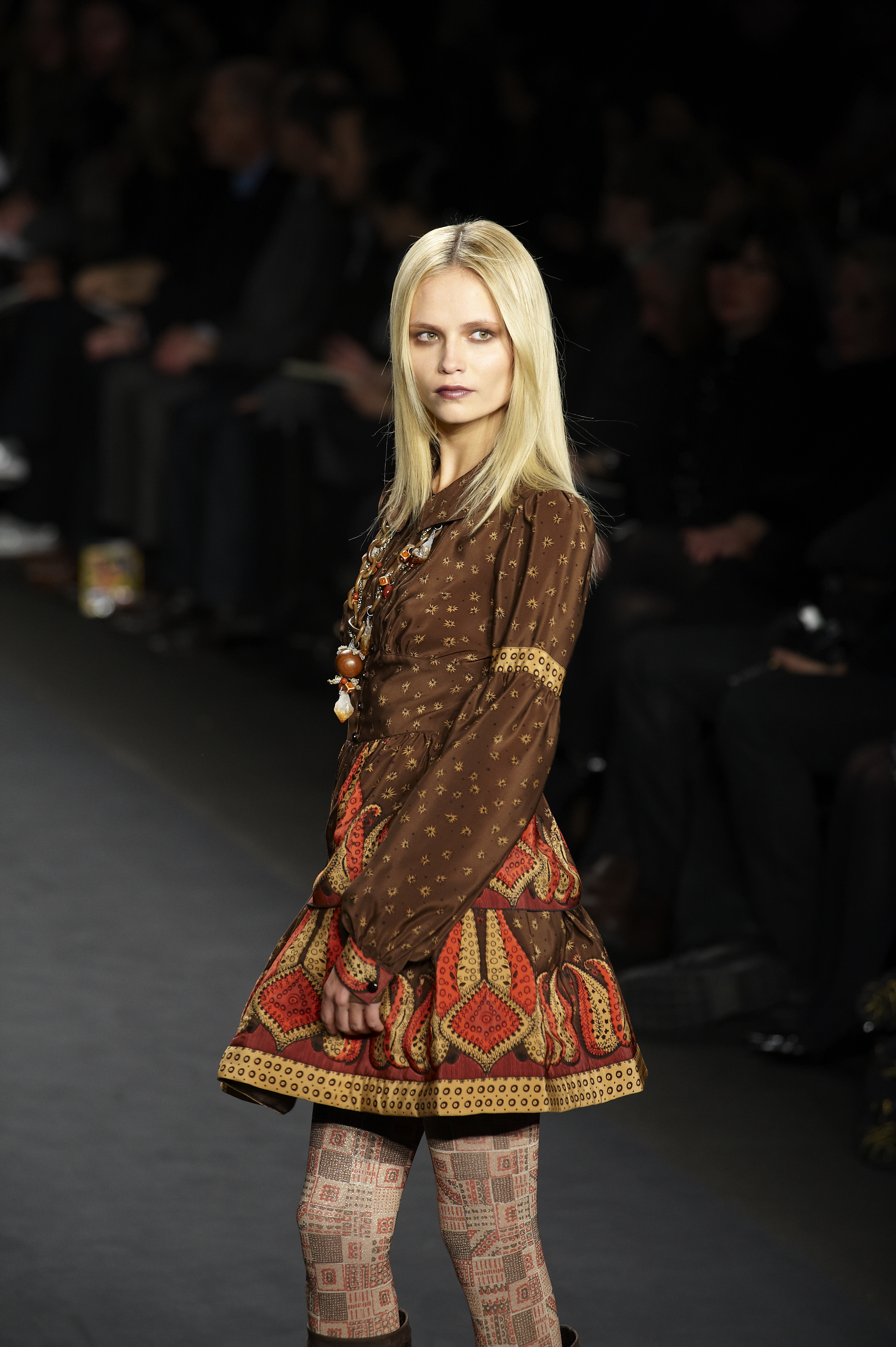
Natasha Poly at the Fall/Winter 2010 show

=== Video/film and television appearances ===
During filming of Confessions of a Shopaholic in 2008, a faux Anna Sui store was mocked up inside the Hearst Tower for the movie set, which also included mock-up stores for Valentino, Catherine Malandrino and Alberta Ferretti. The stunt fooled some New Yorkers into believing an actual store had been opened.

Year	Title	Role	Notes
1994	Hi Octane	Herself	(TV series) Episode 1.3
2008	Bravo A-List Awards	Herself	(TV special)
2010	The City	Herself	(TV show) Episode: "Show 'Em What You Got"
2010	America's Next Top Model	Herself	(TV show) Season 14, episode 11: "America's Next Top Model Is..."
2011	Diana Vreeland: The Eye Has to Travel	Herself	(Documentary)
2012	Project Runway	Herself	(TV show) Season 10, episode 8: "Starving artist"
2011	Fashion News Live	Herself	(TV show) Season 15, episode 42
2013	Tumi Case Studies	Herself	(Short Series) Episode: "Anna Sui"
2014	Make It in America: Empowering Global Fashion	Herself	(Documentary)
2017	Uncensored with Michael Ware: Fashion Week Wars	Herself	(TV show) Season 1, episode 2

== See also ==
- Naomi Campbell
- Sofia Coppola
- Linda Evangelista
- Steven Meisel
- Mudd Club
