= Tarte Cosmetics =

American cosmetics company

- Type: Private
- Industry: Personal care
- Founded: 2000
- Founder: Maureen Kelly
- Headquarters: New York, NY, United States
- Area served: Worldwide
- Key people: Maureen Kelly (CEO)
- Products: Cosmetics and beauty products
- Owner: KOSÉ Corporation (93.7%)
- Website: https://tartecosmetics.com/

Tarte Cosmetics is an American cosmetics company headquartered in New York City.

It was founded by Maureen Kelly in 1999; her first product was a cheek stain that was used the following year for the cover of Self magazine. Also in 2000, Tarte Cosmetics debuted its first order at Henri Bendel. In 2003, Tarte products were being stocked by Sephora and in 2005 at QVC. By 2010, the company's products were being sold by Ulta Beauty.

Tarte products are sold in U.S. department stores, including Macy's and Beauty Brands, and in Sephora stores internationally. The brand heavily utilizes influencer marketing, hosting an annual influencer trip. Tarte's most obscure brand trip was to the island of Bora Bora. However, the brand experienced backlash due to how elaborate and unrelated the brand trip was. Despite backlash, Tarte continues to be a popular topic of conversation, which increases the brand engagement.

== History ==
Tarte Cosmetics was founded by Maureen Kelly. While pursuing a PhD in psychology at Columbia University, she decided to explore her passion for cosmetics because she couldn't find effective makeup that met her standards; she wanted natural makeup products that offered a glamorous look. Kelly started the company with the support of her first husband. Kelly began to research cosmetics and worked out of her apartment until her cheek stain was developed. The cheek stain caught the attention of beauty writers a week after launching in Henri Bendel. Kelly spent much of the first two years delivering sample products to the mail rooms of magazine publishers, hoping they would invite her back. As sales continued, Tarte launched in Sephora in 2003 and two years later on QVC.

In March 2014, a 93.5 percent stake in Tarte Cosmetics was acquired for $135 million by Japanese company Kosé Corporation, which wanted to expand into North America.

In June 2018, Tarte announced the revival of its sister brand, Awake, which produces a line of skincare products. Tarte produces influencer trips for social media influencers, sponsoring them to travel to different locations as a group, such as Costa Rica or Bora Bora. They partnered with influencer Aspyn Ovard to create a custom palette.

== Ingredients ==
Maureen Kelly has stated that she wanted makeup that uses natural ingredients, including Amazonian clay, goji berry extract, passionfruit and vitamins A, C, and E.

Tarte Cosmetics does not use parabens, mineral oil, synthetic fragrances or gluten in their products. Parabens are excluded because they are known to disrupt hormones. Mineral oil is also not included because it clogs pores and can be contaminated with toxins. Synthetic fragrances are avoided due to the risk of allergic reactions. Gluten is not included because if it is accidentally consumed, it could cause a reaction.

== Shape Your Future ==
In 2021, Tarte founded the Shape Your Future Small Business Awards for small business entrepreneurs, which are granted pursuant to criteria ranging from type of business, size of business and maturity of business. Awardees also receive support from Tarte Labs, the company's accelerator.

== Philanthropy ==
Maureen Kelly partnered with Sustainable Amazon Partnership, which encouraged forest stewardship, created new jobs, boosted living conditions, and offered educational opportunities. On 28 August 2017, Tarte announced the company's support of an anti-cyberbullying campaign with the Tyler Clementi Foundation. Tarte asked consumers to take a self-portrait and upload it to Instagram with a hashtag #kissandmakeup. For each self-portrait uploaded, a donation was made to the foundation and one poster received a lifetime supply of Tarte Cosmetics. That year Tarte also founded the charity Heart to Tarte that donates to various causes, including women’s shelters and breast cancer.

In 2020 the company founded Tarte Loves Teachers Initiative, which provides school supplies to teachers from individual classroom wish lists that would otherwise come out of pocket. This included days on which teachers could come to Tarte headquarters in person to pick up classroom supplies and receive free cosmetics and beauty services, and daily discounts for educators.

== Controversies ==
Tarte cosmetics has been accused of racism in multiple instances.

=== 2017 ===
- On 16 September, the official Instagram of the company posted a meme with the text, "my brain during the day: Potato, potato, ching chong tomato". People were quick to call out the company for the racist comment. The company reportedly posted yet another meme, claiming that an intern had posted it, not knowing that it contained a racial slur. The company disabled comments on the apology citing conflict amongst the people commenting as the reason.

=== 2018 ===
- After the foundation version of its "Shape Tape Concealer" line released on MLK day, consumers noticed that the shade range ignored darker skin tones as it only had 14 tones, most of which for fairer skin.

=== 2023 ===
- Black influencers were added in a second trip that took place in Turks & Caicos and Miami in May 2023. POC creators were quick to call out racial discrimination. It was alleged that POC creators were given smaller rooms as well as different itineraries than the non-POC creators . The brand's CEO apologized during a GRWM video, which was called out as insufficient and insensitive due to its casual nature, leading to a formal statement by the brand.
