= Jools Lebron =

American social media personality (born 1993)

- Born: 1993/1994 (age 32–33)
- Occupation: Internet celebrity
- Years active: 2023–present

Instagram information
- Page: jools lebron
- Followers: 263 K

TikTok information
- Page: joolieannie
- Followers: 2.3 million
- Last updated: November 3, 2026

Jools Lebron (born 1993/1994) is an American social media personality. Her August 2024 videos about being "demure" at the workplace went viral and acquired several million views, with multiple celebrities, companies, agencies, and brands using the phrase in their online marketing and social media posts. She attracted further coverage after appearing on Jimmy Kimmel Live! and after unrelated parties tried to trademark phrases related to the phrase. "Demure", popularized by Lebron, became Dictionary.com's word of the year in 2024.

== Career ==
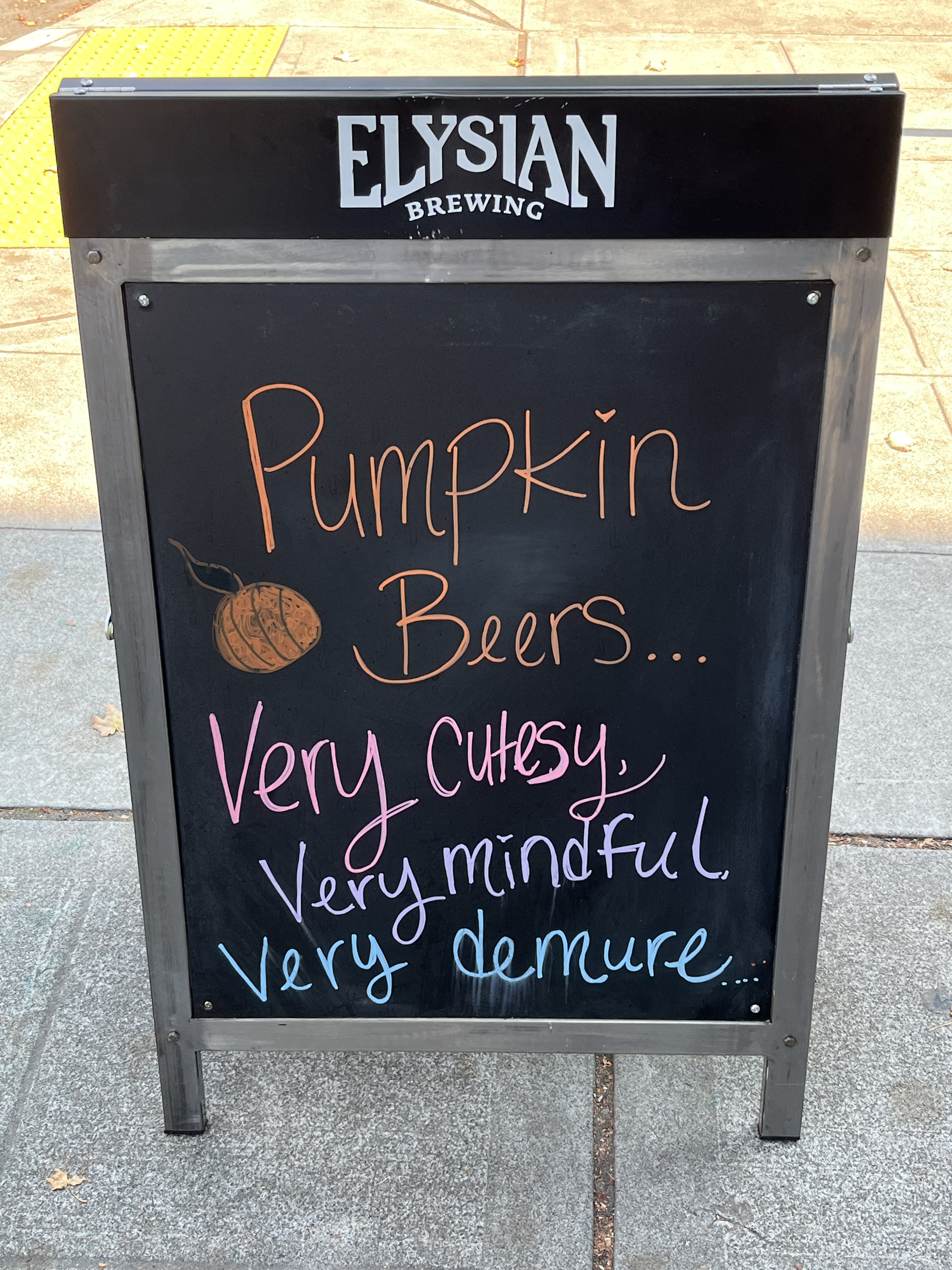
Sign at Elysian Brewing Company in Seattle, Washington, referencing Lebron's catch phrase

Lebron worked as a cashier at Mariano's in Illinois. She posted make-up tutorial videos and posted content of her Bratz doll collection to TikTok. In May 2023, she partnered with Patrick Starrr on a beauty campaign.

On August 2, 2024, Lebron uploaded a 17-second video titled "How to be Demure at Work" to TikTok, which went viral on the platform. A further video, featuring Lebron giving tips on how to behave that way at work, also went viral; by August 20, the two videos had amassed over 7,000,000 and 34,000,000 views respectively. Celebrities including Jennifer Lopez, Olivia Rodrigo, RuPaul, Joe Jonas and Penn Badgley have made social media videos using the audio bits from Lebron's original videos. Companies, agencies, and brands including NASA have also used the phrase in their online marketing and social media posts. By August 25, 2024, her following had grown to two million people. In a subsequent TikTok, she announced that she was able to pay for her gender transition due to the success of her videos.

On August 19, 2024, Lebron made an appearance as a guest on Jimmy Kimmel Live!.

=== "Very demure, very mindful" ===
In August 2024, Lebron's catchphrase "very demure, very mindful" became widespread on TikTok. The verbal trend based on the satirical phrase is believed to mock "influencer trends like the 'clean girl' aesthetic", according to The Independent, and involved participation from beauty brands.

TMZ reported that a man from Washington filed to trademark Lebron's catchphrase with the intention to use it for marketing, promotion, and advertising. Following this incident, and several other separate incidents where individuals unrelated to Lebron attempted to file trademarks related to the word 'demure', she filed for two herself.

== Personal life ==
Lebron is a trans woman of Puerto Rican heritage. She stated in 2024 that watching online content made by transgender social media influencers Gigi Gorgeous, La Demi, and Nikita Dragun helped her come out.
