= Narumiya International =

Japanese textile and clothing company

Narumiya International Company Limited
- Type: Company Limited
- Industry: Textiles, Children's clothing, Retail
- Founded: 1906, Hiroshima, Japan
- Headquarters: Tokyo, Japan
- Area served: Worldwide
- Key people: Toshiaki Ishii
- Number of employees: (1,404 (April 2016))
- Parent: SBI Holdings
- Website: http://www.narumiya-net.co.jp/

Narumiya International (株式会社ナルミヤ・インターナショナル) is a Japanese limited company headquartered in Minato Ward, Tokyo, Japan. The firm manufactures and distributes textiles and specializes in children's clothing.

== Overview ==
As of 2005, the company operated 896 stores globally. The company focuses on the manufacture, processing, and sale of childrenʼs clothing and accessories for existing brands under license and for the company's own set of in-house brands. In 2007, SBI Holdings took a majority stake in the company. In August 2016, it was announced that Japan Industrial Partners was to acquire Narumiya for an undisclosed amount.

== History ==
- In 1906, the company was established as a dry goods wholesaler in Hiroshima, Japan.
- In 1952, the company was registered as the Narumiya Textile Corporation.
- In 1968, the company began making women's apparel.
- In 1979, the company changed its name to the Narumiya Corporation and moved its head office to Minato Ward, Tokyo from Hiroshima.
- In August 1991, the name was changed again to Narumiya Enterprise Company Limited with the establishment of two wholly owned subsidiaries, Narumiya International Corporation and Narumiya Company Limited.
- In 1995, the company name was again changed to Narumiya International Company Limited, and a store was opened in Hong Kong.
- On March 9, 2009, the company was listed on the JASDAQ

== Brands ==
- Angel Blue
- Anna Sui Mini
- B.room
- Baby Cheer
- Blue Cross -964-
- Blue Cross Girls
- Blue Cross Kids
- By Loveit
- Daisy Lovers
- Daisy Lovers Paradise Kids
- Kate Spade New York Children's
- Lindsay
- Jusqu'a
- Kladscap
- Love & Peace & Money Clothing
- Lovetoxic
- Mezzo Piano
- Mini-K
- Petit Main
- Petit Main Lien
- Pink Papillon
- Pom Ponette
- Pom Ponette Junior
- Pupil House
- Sense of Wonder
- X-Girl Stages
- XLarge Kids
