= Kosé =

Japanese cosmetics and personal care company

Kosé Holdings Corporation
- Kosé's current logo, designed by Saul Bass in 1991

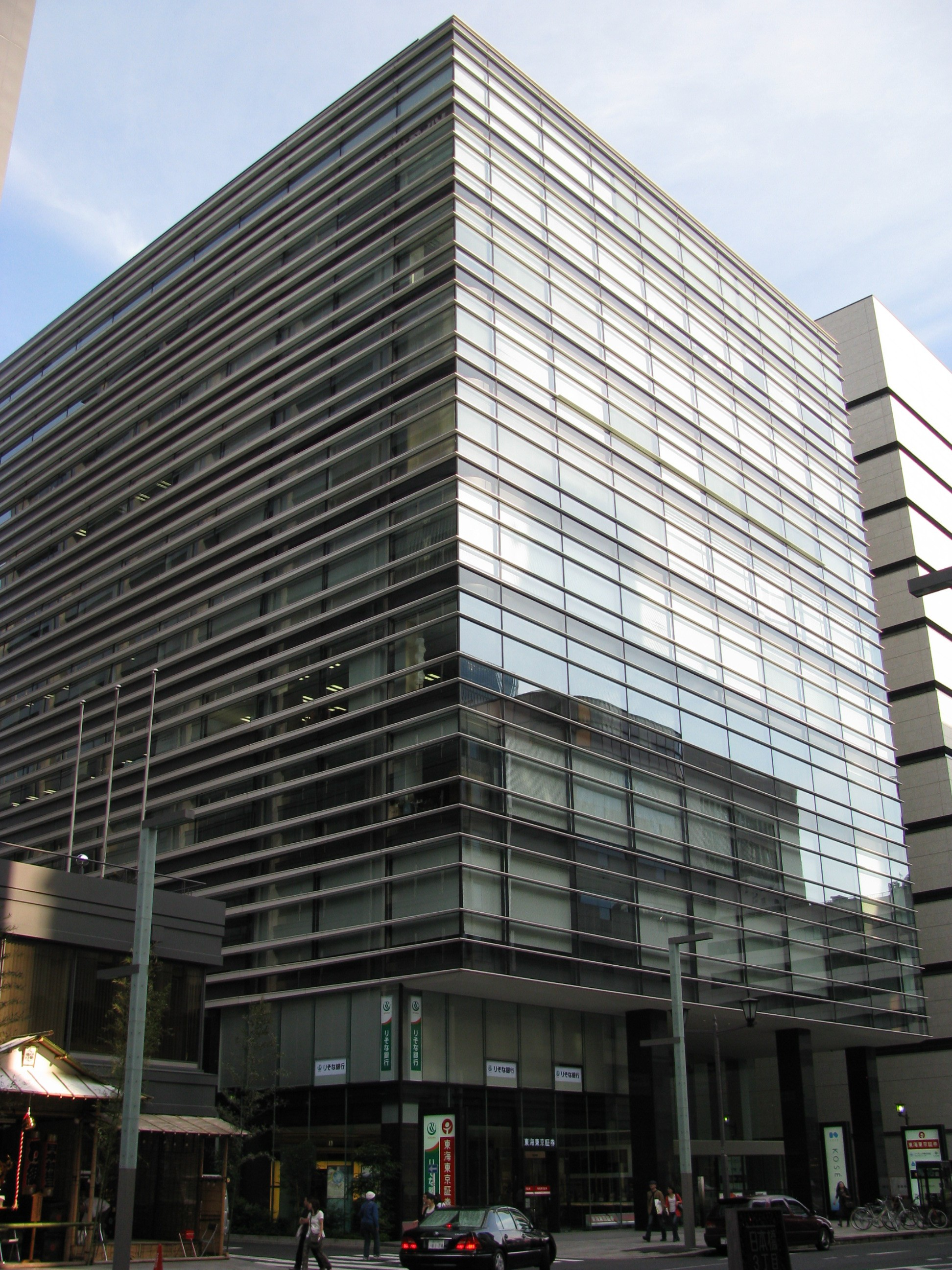
- Kosé headquarters building in Tokyo
- Native name: 株式会社コーセーホールディングス
- Formerly: Kobayashi Kosé Co., Ltd. (1948–1991); Kosé Corporation (1991-2026)
- Type: Public Kabushiki kaisha
- Traded as: TYO: 4922
- ISIN: JP3283650004
- Industry: Personal care
- Founded: March 2, 1946; 80 years ago (brand); June 11, 1948; 78 years ago (company)
- Founder: Kozaburo Kobayashi
- Headquarters: Nihonbashi, Chūō, Tokyo, Japan
- Area served: Worldwide
- Key people: Kazutoshi Kobayashi (President and CEO)
- Products: Cosmetics; Skin care products; Hair care products
- Revenue: ▼¥279,389 million (Mar 2021)
- Net income: ▼¥11,986 million (Mar 2021)
- Number of employees: 14,403 (incl.temporary and part-time employees) (as of March 31, 2021)
- Subsidiaries: Kosé; Albion; Tarte Cosmetics
- Website: Official website

Kosé Holdings Corporation (株式会社コーセーホールディングス, Kabushiki-kaisha Kōsē hōrudingusu; stylized in all-caps as KOSÉ) is a Japanese multinational company that manufactures cosmetics, personal care products, and beauty products. It is headquartered in Chūō, Tokyo.

== History ==
The company was founded in 1946 by Kozaburo Kobayashi with his son as the principal chemist. In 1956, the company established Albion, a manufacturer of premium cosmetics. Kosé and L'Oréal of France signed an agreement for technological cooperation, a joint venture that lasted until 2001. The company expanded its international presence in Asia during the 1960s to the 1980s. The company's name was changed to its present one in 1991.

In 2000 it was listed on the First Section of the Tokyo Stock Exchange.

Kazutoshi Kobayashi, the founder's grandson, took over as the company's CEO in 2007. Under the leadership of the new CEO, Kosé introduced the Jill Stuart branded cosmetics after the company acquired global trademark rights for the brand in 2009. Kosé subsequently expanded into the European and North American markets when it acquired Tarte Cosmetics in 2014.

== Advertising ==
Kosé's products were advertised over the years by models and athletes including Shohei Ohtani and Kate Moss for its Decorté brand photographed by Mario Testino, Yuzuru Hanyu for Sekkisei and Yui Aragaki, for the Esprique line of makeup.

== See also ==
- D.League
