= D.League =

Dance league in Japan

- Founded: 2021
- Organizing body: D.League (corporation)
- No. of teams: 13 (from 2023–24 season)
- Country: Japan
- Region: Asia
- Website: home.dleague.co.jp

The D.League is a professional dance league in Japan operated by D.League Co., Ltd.

== Teams ==
Team	Owner	Director	Note
Avex Royalbrats	Avex	Yuta Nakamura	
Benefit One Monoliz	Benefit One	Hal Hirata	
CyberAgent Legit	CyberAgent	Fishboy (dancer)	
Dip Battles	Dip (corporation)	Shuho (dancer)	From 2021 to 2022 season.
DYM Messengers	DYM	Takuya	From 2023–24 season.
Fullcast Raiserz	Fullcast Holdings	Twiggz "Jun"	
Kadokawa Dreams	Kadokawa Corporation	Keita Tanaka	
Kosé 8rocks	Kosé	Kaku	
Lifull Alt-rhythm	Lifull	Ryo Noguchi	From 2021 to 2022 season.
Medical Concierge I'moon	Medical Concierge	Mizue	The team name between 2020–21 and 2022–23 season was Usen-next I'moon.
Sega Sammy Lux	Sega Sammy Holdings	CanDoo	
Septeni Raptures	Septeni Holdings	Akihito	
Valuence Infinities	Valuence Holdings	Steez	From 2022 to 2023 season.

== Sponsorship ==
=== Top partner ===
Company	Period
SoftBank	2021–present

=== Title sponsor ===
Supplier	Period
Dai-ichi Life	2021–present

=== Drink sponsor ===
Company	Period
Coca-Cola	2021–present

=== Sponsor ===
Company	Period
Air Salonpas	2021–present
Kabaya	2021–present
Line	2021–present
Yahoo! Japan	2021–present
Egaodo	2021–present
Champagne Collet	2021–present
Nisshin Seifun Welna	2021–present

== See also ==
- Breakdancing
- Breaking at the Summer Olympics
