= Aspyn Ovard =

American influencer and reality show cast member

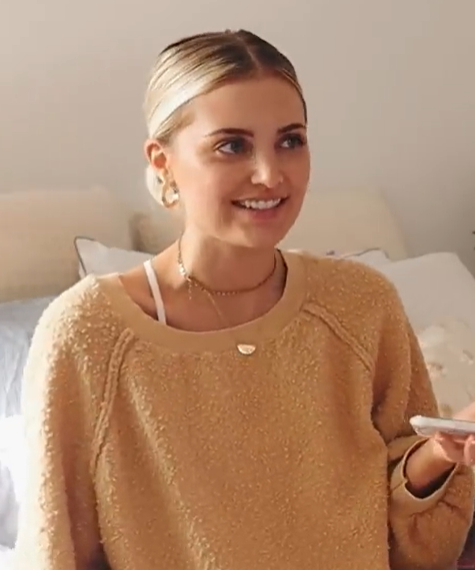
- Ovard in 2020
- Born: April 15, 1996 (age 30); St. George, Utah, U.S.
- Occupations: Influencer, reality show cast member
- Spouse: Parker Ferris (m. 2015; div. 2024)
- Children: 3

Aspyn Ovard (born April 15, 1996) is an American influencer and reality show cast member. She is best known for her fashion, beauty, and lifestyle content on YouTube, which she began in 2011. She has been cast in the reality show series The Secret Lives of Mormon Wives: Orange County.

== Early Life ==
Ovard was born on April 15, 1996 in St. George, Utah. She has a younger sister, Avrey Ovard, and two brothers, Tavyn and Trey Ovard. Ovard states that her keen interest in beauty came from her mother, Sacha Ovard, who worked as a hairdresser. The beauty industry was a big part of her life growing up.

Her father's alcoholism greatly affected Ovard's upbringing and outlook on the trust and honesty in romantic relationships.

== Career ==
She began creating YouTube videos in 2011 when she was in high school, which focused on life updates, beauty content and content with her then-boyfriend Parker Ferris. By 2014, she had over a million followers on YouTube, and emphasized being yourself. She shared a joint account with Ferris throughout their relationship.

In 2016, Ovard founded Luca + Graw, a fashion and lifestyle business which mirrored her own tastes displayed on her social media platforms. The brand allowed her to grown beyond monetising her content purely through advertising revenue and sponsored content.

By 2018, she had shifted to more lifestyle-focused content and began also creating on Instagram, which she had reached 1.9 million followers on. She partnered with Tarte Cosmetics that year to create her own self-branded palette. She also began creating content featuring her children, but by 2023 had begun using emojis to cover their faces. In 2025 the palette returned with new shade names. The relaunch aided efforts to support childhood cancer causes, it is clear her personal experiences influence many parts of her personal and professional life.

In April 2026, Hulu announced The Secret Lives of Mormon Wives: Orange County with Ovard being a member of the cast. Ovard is neither Mormon nor married, but stated she had "so many ties" with Mormonism due to her upbringing in Salt Lake City. Ovard later stated that this was an exception to her previous policy of never doing reality TV. Ovard confirmed her children would not be appearing on the show. In May 2026, she confirmed her partners would also be appearing on the show with her. That same month, she revealed she had taken anxiety medication to cope with the stress of filming the show.

=== Television Appearances ===
Year	Title	Notes
2026	The Secret Lives of Mormon Wives: Orange County	Main cast member (season 1)

== Personal life ==
In 2015, she married Parker Ferris. She was 19 at the time. The couple have three daughters together; Cove born in 2019, Lola born in 2021, and Elle born in 2024. In November 2026, she shared that her oldest daughter was diagnosed with terminal cancer in 2023.

On April 1, 2024, Ovard filed for divorce from Ferris in the Salt Lake County, Utah Third District Court the same day they announced the birth of their third child. She paused divorce proceedings soon after to negotiate a settlement, and later that year moved to California. She has not publicly spoken on the reasons behind the divorce, but has alluded to alleged lies. She also converted her joint bank account with Ferris to a personal account in 2024.

In November 2026, it was revealed Ferris had lied about drinking and was doing so behind her back throughout their marriage. She stated her father struggled with alcoholism throughout her life and died from it, and that she believed her and Ferris were on the same page about not drinking or smoking. She found out about this two months after the death of her father.

In October 2024, she came out as bisexual. In March 2026, after speculation, Ovard revealed she was in a throuple relationship with fellow influencer Briana Davis and her husband Billy Davis, the relationship began as a long-distance relationship between Ovard, Briana and Billy until Ovard moved to Orange County, California. Despite pushback from Ferris, Briana and Billy Davis have an active involvement in Ovard and Ferris' childrens' lives. The throuple also confirmed she had no intention to ever marry.
