= Tim Blanks =

Canadian-New Zealand fashion journalist

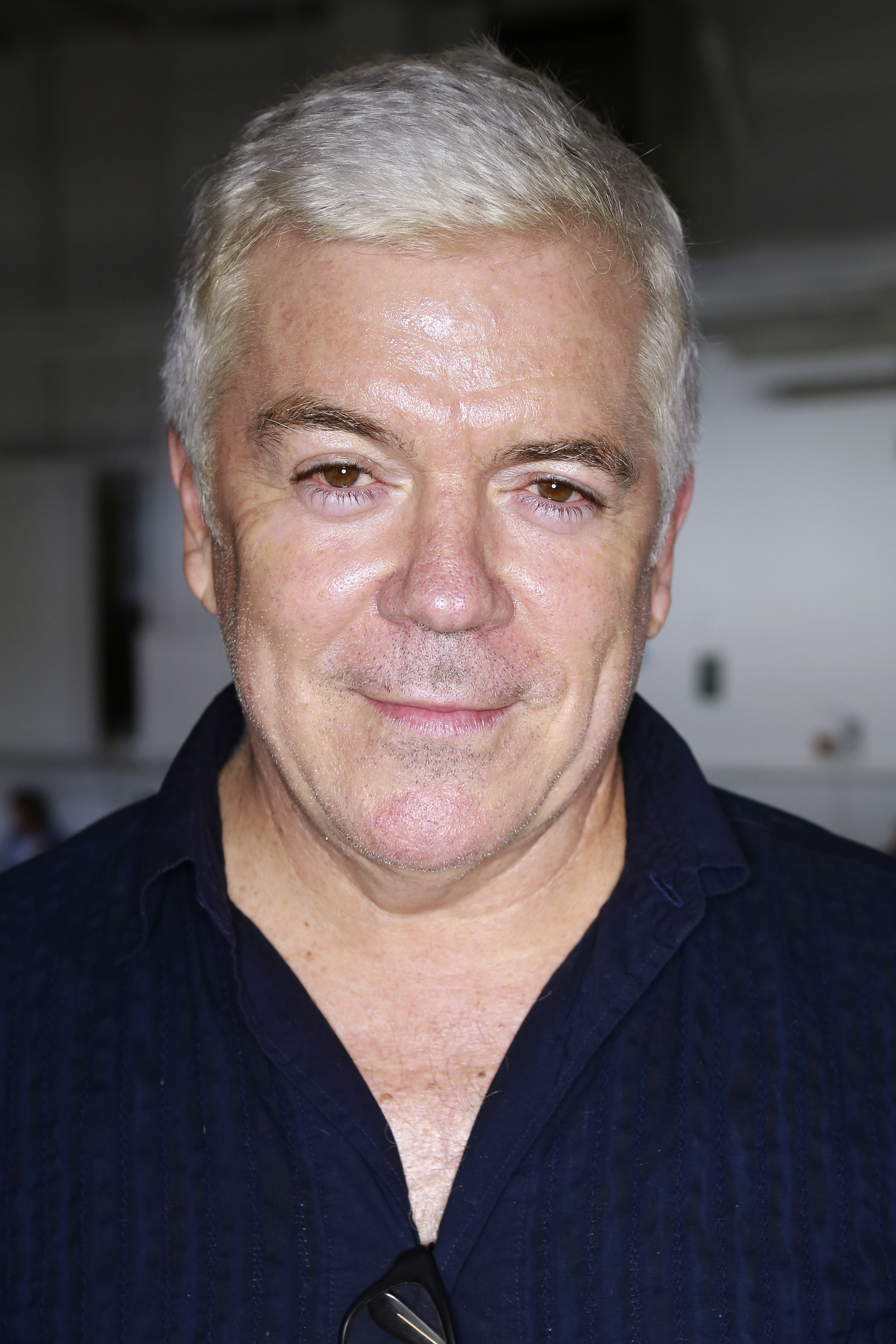
- Blanks in 2014
- Born: 1955 or 1956 (age 70–71); Auckland, New Zealand
- Occupations: Broadcaster, writer
- Notable work: The World of Anna Sui
- Television: Fashion File
- Partner: Jeff Lounds

Tim Blanks (born 1955 or 1956) is a Canadian-New Zealand fashion journalist, broadcaster and writer.

== Career ==
Blanks is the former host of the television show Fashion File, which he hosted from 1989 until 2006. He worked as editor-at-large for Style.com, where he hosted Throwback Thursdays, a fashion retrospective. In 2015, he became Editor-at-Large of fashion website The Business of Fashion.

Blanks has written for a number of international magazines and newspapers, including Another, LOVE, Interview, The New York Times, Fantastic Man and System. He is the author of The World of Anna Sui and Versace Catwalk and has also contributed to monographs on, among others, Alexander McQueen, Dolce & Gabbana, Walter Van Beirendonck, Bottega Veneta and Dries Van Noten. In 2013, he was honoured by the Council of Fashion Designers of America with its Media Award, the industry's top award for fashion journalism.

In 2017, Blanks became Mentor of the Master in Fashion Critique and Curation at Polimoda fashion school in Florence, Italy.

== Personal life ==
Blanks was born in Auckland, New Zealand. He left the country in 1974. Blanks has lived with his partner Jeff Lounds, a perfume specialist, in London, England since 1990.

== Awards ==
Blanks received the Council of Fashion Designers of America (CFDA) Media Award in 2013.

== Bibliography ==
- Blanks, Tim (2017). The World of Anna Sui. New York: Abrams. ISBN 978-1-4197-2418-3.

== See also ==
- CFDA Fashion Awards
- Fashion journalism
