= Bob Bernstein =

American businessman and entrepreneur

- Born: Robert A. Bernstein; 1939 (age 86–87)
- Education: University of Oklahoma
- Occupations: Co-founder of Bernstein-Rein; Founder of Beauty Brands
- Spouse: Dr. Phyliss Bernstein
- Children: 3

Robert "Bob" Bernstein is an American businessman and entrepreneur. He is the co-founder of the advertising company Bernstein-Rein and the founder of Beauty Brands.

== Bernstein-Rein ==
In 1964, Bernstein and Skip Rein opened Bernstein-Rein, a marketing and communications firm located in Kansas City, Missouri. At the time the business was opened, Bernstein had $100 in the bank and took out a $2,500 loan.

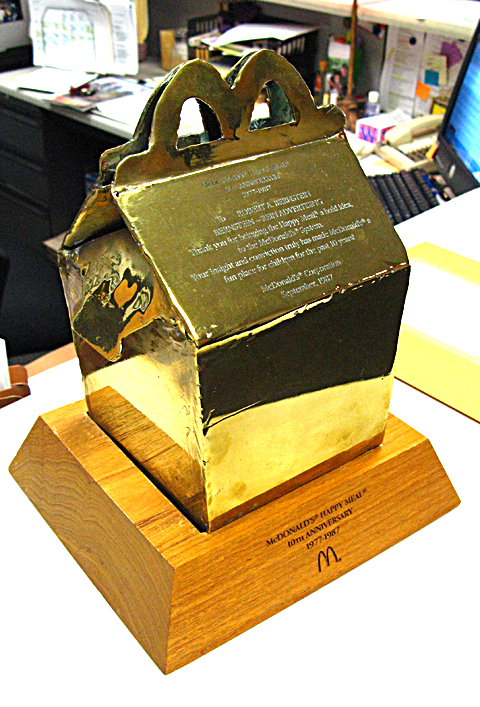
Golden Happy Meal presented to Robert Bernstein crediting him with creation of the Happy Meal

Bernstein-Rein was retained by McDonald's in 1967. In 1969, the agency created a series of illustrated glasses for McDonald's called the "Happy Cup." In 1977, Bernstein developed the Happy Meal packaging for McDonald's. The Happy Meal was tested in four cities before being released nationally in 1979.

In 1974, Bernstein-Rein was hired by Sam Walton to do advertising for Walmart. The agency worked with Walmart through early 2007. The agency developed the "Buy American" ad campaign for Walmart in the 1980s, and in the 1990s developed the smiley face frequently used in Walmart's television and in-store marketing. The "Buy American" campaign came under scrutiny after a Dateline NBC episode in December 1992 charged that Walmart "imports a number of its private-label clothes while playing up its ambitious 'Buy America' campaign."

Before losing its Walmart account in early 2007, BR was one of the six largest independent ad agencies in the United States (36th largest overall), with 350 employees and annual billings of more than $550 million. In 2008, after losing accounts with Walmart and USAA, its gross income was $45.1 million.

In the 1990s, Bernstein-Rein developed its own retail business, Beauty Brands, creating a retail approach it described as "InsideOut Retailing". The agency, which had the entire Blockbuster LLC account until early 1994, came up with the slogan "Make It a Blockbuster Night".

May 21, 2003 was declared “Bob Bernstein Day” by the mayor of Kansas City.

== Personal life ==
Bernstein is married to Dr. Phyliss (née Wolkoff) Bernstein, a clinical psychologist. They have three children: Steven Bernstein, Susan Bernstein Luetje, and David Bernstein. The Bernsteins are Jewish. They are members of Temple B'nai Jehudah in Overland Park, Kansas. The Phyliss and Bob Bernstein Humanitarian Award at Jewish Family Services (JFS) is granted yearly.
