= Anna Sui (book) =

2009 book by Susan Muaddi Darraj

- Author: Susan Muaddi Darraj
- Language: English
- Subject: Fashion design
- Genre: Non-fiction, Biography
- Publisher: Infobase Publishing
- Publication date: 2009
- Publication place: US
- Media type: Print (Softcover)
- Pages: 120
- ISBN: 9781438128641

Anna Sui is a 2009 book written by Susan Muaddi Darraj and published by Infobase Publishing as an inspirational reference for aspiring young women in a series by Infobase called Asian Americans of Achievement. The book documents the early life and early career of fashion designer Anna Sui.

== Content ==
The book is written as inspirational reference for young women and girls aspiring to go into the fashion industry or otherwise. The book details Sui's upbringing in a Chinese-American family and how the designer overcame initial doubts over her choice of career. It goes on to document Sui's rise in the industry and a few of the pivotal situations that led to it, stressing the need to be prepared for the situations that life presents, the importance of perseverance and not letting go of one's dreams. The book specifically documents Sui's encounters and interactions with Madonna, Paris Hilton, Linda Evangelista and Christy Turlington amongst others.

== Reviews ==
Reviews for the book were generally positive with Booklist via Amazon giving the book 7 out of 10.

== See also ==
- History of fashion design
- Anna Sui
- Susan Muaddi Darraj
- Infobase Publishing
