= Sophie Mechaly =

Fashion designer (born 1967)

Sophie Mechaly (born 1967), previously known as Sophie Albou, is a Paris-born designer best known as the founder of the Paul & Joe clothing line. The daughter of Yvan and Nicole Haggiag, a clothing company executive and designer respectively, Mechaly worked for the clothing company Azzedine Alaia in 1983, and was later educated at the Sorbonne and the Institut Français de la Mode.

In 1995, she started a menswear company called Paul & Joe, adding a womenswear line in 1996. The first show in the United States was opened in New York City in 1996.

Mechaly opened another store in Notting Hill, and also has a store in Covent Garden. The London stores were closed due to what was rumoured to be financial trouble – they reopened in 2009, with the explanation that it was simply restructuring.

Mechaly partnered with American apparel company Urban Outfitters to produce a female casualwear line, Rendez-Vous, in 2011.

In 2015, it was announced that Mechaly will partner with American lingerie company Cosabella to produce a female lingerie line, Paul & Joe x Cosabella, to be released in Spring-Summer 2016.

Paul & Joe Beaute is a brand line offered by Japanese cosmetics brand Albion Cosmetics, inspired by her fashion house Paul & Joe.

In 2022, Mechaly was an investor on the 2nd season of the French reality television series Qui veut être mon associé? ("Who wants to be my business partner?"), part of the Dragons' Den franchise.
