= Albion Co., Ltd. =

Japanese cosmetics manufacturer and distributor

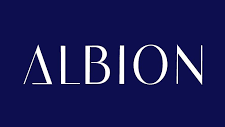
- Type: Kabushiki gaisha
- Industry: Cosmetics
- Founded: March 2, 1956; 70 years ago in Ginza, Tokyo, Japan
- Headquarters: Tokyo, Japan
- Number of employees: 2,890
- Parent: Kosé Corporation
- Website: www.albion.co.jp

Albion Co., Ltd. or Albion (Japanese: 株式会社アルビオン) is a Japanese manufacturer and distributor (business) of luxury cosmetics founded in 1956. Albion offers global and Japanese brand cosmetic lines. The company is headquartered in Ginza, Tokyo. The company is a consolidated subsidiary of the Kosé Corporation as a part of the cosmetics market with sales and distribution occurring largely in boutiques, standalone stores and department stores. Albion's major offices are in Tokyo, London, Hong Kong, and New York City.

'GRAND DUKE', the luxury skin care line is one of the oldest brands of Albion. It was launched in 1972. Their herbal skincare lotion Skicon that is prepared using coix seed extract was launched in 1974.

Their market is mainly in Asia, Europe and the United States. Other most known skin care lines of Albion are 'INFINESSE' and 'EXAGE' together with original care items based on natural extracts and herbal medicines. The brand also offers skin care brands like “Elégance”, “INFIORE”, and “IGNIS” brand.

They launched cosmetic lines from fashion brands “ANNA SUI” and “PAUL & JOE”, and the line of “Les Merveilleuses LADURÉE” with the Parisian patisserie brand.

== Brands ==
- Albion
- Elegance
- Ignis
- In Fiore
- Anna Sui
- Paul & Joe
- Ladurée
- Grand Duke
