= Daryl Kerrigan =

Fashion designer

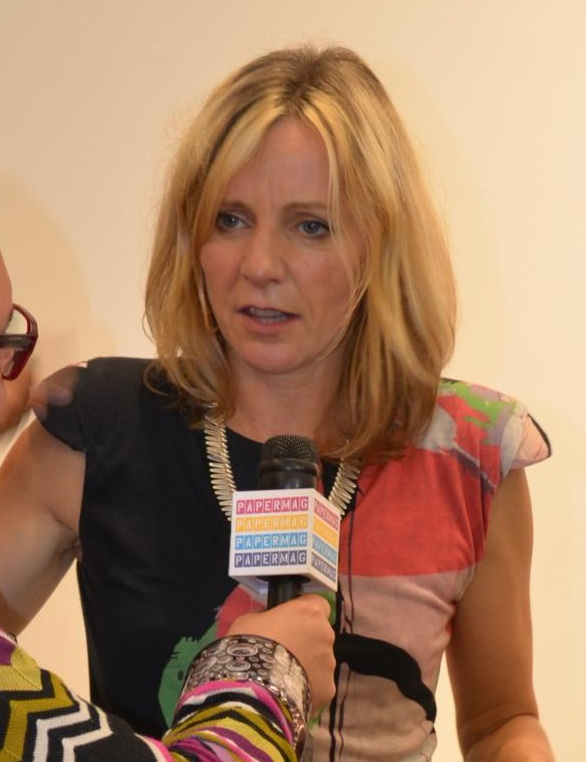
- Daryl Kerrigan in 2011
- Born: Dublin, Ireland
- Education: National College of Art and Design
- Labels: Daryl K; Daryl K 189; Kerrigan
- Awards: CFDA Perry Ellis Award

Daryl Kerrigan (born 2 April), known professionally as Daryl K, is an Irish-born fashion designer based in New York City.

== Early life ==
Kerrigan was born in Dublin. Inspired by her mother's fashion sense and dressmaking abilities, Kerrigan enrolled at the National College of Art and Design in Dublin. When she was 22 years old, Kerrigan moved to New York City.

== Career ==
Kerrigan's first years in New York were spent working in film, as a costume designer and on-set wardrobe supervisor for independent features such as Jim Jarmusch's Mystery Train and My Cousin Vinny starring Marisa Tomei.

With no prior experience working in the fashion industry, she opened her first shop in the East Village, on Sixth Street, using her savings, in 1991. Publicity came through word of mouth from musicians, performers and style hunters. She immediately developed the Hip Hugger Bootleg Jean, which drew people like Sonic Youth front woman Kim Gordon, as well as fashion editors like Camilla Nickerson and stylists to the store and earned Kerrigan cult status in fashion circles. Her boot-cut hipster jeans, dubbed "low riders", were inspired by a pair of red velvet 70's hiphuggers. These jeans were to make her name and become the mainstay of her collections.

In 1997, Kerrigan opened a store on 21 Bond Street in William Wegman's former studio; this developed into her flagship store.

Kerrigan suffered some setbacks after her labels ("Daryl K" and "K-189") were acquired by the Leiber Group in 2000. After just a year, her stores in Los Angeles and New York closed, with the Leiber Group halting production. In 2002, she fought to get back the rights to her labels, and subsequently re-launched the brands in October 2002, in the same Bond Street store that had been closed in 2001. Mostly based on word-of-mouth, trade resumed. Shortly after, as the Daryl K line began to sell out in Barneys New York and other locations, Kerrigan and The Barneys Team launched the Daryl K-189 /Co-Op collection together.

Kerrigan held shows which were noted for their artistic vision: An empty swimming pool in the LES; the space now known as "Capitale" when it was a working bank; the roof of Gordon Bunshaft's Lever House; on top of a flatbed truck, in the Gagosian Gallery on 21st Street when it was a parking garage – Joey Ramone attended this show as Ramones tracks played back to back for the entire runway show.

She has been a consultant to companies including Calvin Kelin, The Gap, The Limited, and Tommy Hilfiger.

In March 2012, Kerrigan closed the store on Bond Street, with the Daryl K collection continuing to sell through the Daryl K website and various retailers. The Daryl K stretch Leather leggings continued to be worn by a variety of clients. Since 2012, she has created collaborative collections for companies including Urban Outfitters, Steven Alan, Madewell, Calvin Klein, CK Jeans and Beauty.com.

== Personal life ==
Kerrigan is partnered with Paul Leonard, also from Dublin; the couple has two children.
