= Lab Made =

Ice cream company

- Industry: Food and Beverage
- Founded: 2012; 14 years ago
- Founder: Ronnie Cheng Hong-wang; Jennifer Chiu
- Headquarters: Hong Kong
- Products: Liquid nitrogen ice-cream
- Website: labmade.com.hk

Lab Made is the first liquid nitrogen ice cream company based in Hong Kong. Founded in 2012, the company's ice cream formula employs liquid nitrogen to freeze ingredients in less than a minute.

== History ==
Lab Made was founded in July 2012 by Ronnie Cheng Hong-wang and Jennifer Chiu, former pharmacists. The couple discovered liquid nitrogen ice cream while working in England and later introduced the product to the Hong Kong market by opening their first shop in Tin Hau. In August 2013, Lab Made was noted in the South China Morning Post as an example of innovative entrepreneurship.

According to the company's website, Lab Made no longer operates retail locations. The company provides catering services and educational entertainment shows.

== Method ==
Lab Made's ice cream production process utilizes KitchenAid mixers to combine ingredients with liquid nitrogen. This process employs the low temperature of liquid nitrogen, -196 degrees Celsius, to emit a gas vapor which freezes the ice cream.

== Products ==
Lab Made offers liquid nitrogen ice cream in a variety of flavors. Some of the company's past flavors have included apple crumble, Hong Kong crispy toast, mooncake, sticky toffee pudding and strawberry cheesecake.

== Awards ==
- “Best Desserts 2012” - Time Out Magazine HK
- “Best Restaurant Awards 2012” - OpenRice
- “Best (Hong Kong) Restaurant Awards 2012” (Voted by Chinese Netizens) - OpenRice
- “Youth Business Award 2013” (Silver Award Winner) - HSBC
- “Most Favourite Youth Business Award Online 2013” - HSBC
- “Best Restaurant in Causeway Bay Awards 2014” - OpenRice
- “Best Dessert Shop Awards 2014” - OpenRice
- “Best (Hong Kong) Restaurant Awards 2014” (Voted by Taiwanese Netizens) - OpenRice
- “Best-ever Dining Awards 2014” - Weekend HK Magazine
- “Hong Kong Emerging Service Brand 2014” - Hong Kong Brand Development Council
- “Recommendation Restaurant 2014” - Commanderies des Cordons Bleus de France
- “Top 10 SME Customer Service Excellence Award 2014” - HKACE
- “Caring Company 2015” - Hong Kong Council of Social Service
- “Hong Kong’s Most Valuable Companies Awards 2015” - Mediazone
