= The World of Anna Sui =

- Housed at: The Fashion and Textile Museum
- Curators: Dennis Nothdruft Anna Sui started her ready to wear label in 1981.
- Website: https://fashiontextilemuseum.org/exhibitionsdisplays/the-world-of-anna-sui/?date_from=20170526&date_to=20171001

The World of Anna Sui was an exhibition housed at London's Fashion and Textile Museum from 26 May to 1 October 2017.

The exhibition was curated by the museum's head curator Dennis Nothdruft and focused on the effect of Sui's work on the history of fashion design. The exhibit featured over 100 looks from the Sui’s archive, spanning the entirety the designer's career from 1981 to 2017 which covers a multitude of styles and trends, each telling a story. It also marked the first time an American fashion designer had been the feature of a retrospective exhibit in the United Kingdom. She was different than American designers as the garments she designed and outfits she styled genuinely “told stories” about the theme she chose. Her designs are often references to other works of arts such as books, movies, music, etc. Sui created a new period for fashion which made her very special and different in comparison to American designers. One key theme of the exhibition was the exploration of national identity through the medium of fashion and textiles in addition to Sui's own inspiration from femininity and New York's subcultures.

== See also ==
- The Fashion and Textile Museum
- Anna Sui
- History of fashion design
