= Beauty Brands =

American midwest-based salon and spa superstore since 1995

- Type: Private
- Industry: Beauty salon
- Founded: 1995
- Founder: Bob Bernstein
- Headquarters: Kansas City, Missouri, United States
- Number of locations: 33 (December 2018)
- Key people: Caryn Lerner; CEO-Chief executive officer
- Services: Personal grooming
- Parent: Private
- Website: beautybrands.com

Beauty Brands Inc. is a salon and spa superstore developed and founded by the advertising company, Bernstein-Rein. The company headquarters is located in Kansas City, Missouri. The company was purchased in November 2013 by a private California-based company replacing Bob Bernstein and David Bernstein with Lyn Kirby as the CEO and Rich Bos as President respectively.

== Founding ==
Robert "Bob" Bernstein, CEO of Bernstein-Rein, advertising company, developed and founded the salon and spa superstore in 1995. Bob's son, David, started with the company in 1995, became Vice President of Operations in 2000, then the COO in 2006 before Bob finally made David President and Owner of Beauty Brands in 2009, with Bob remaining as Chairman-CEO.

== Locations ==
As of April 2013, Beauty Brands had 65 locations in 11 states, spanning all over the Midwest with stores in Arizona, Colorado, Kansas, Missouri, Iowa, Oklahoma, North Carolina, Indiana, Illinois, Nebraska, Ohio and Texas.

In December 2018, Beauty Brands downsized the company by closing 35 of its 58 stores they had throughout the country and reduced staff at its headquarters by a third, leaving around 50. Beauty Brands’ CEO Caryn Lerner said “This year has proven to be a tough year for our business despite our efforts to combat industry headwinds. Necessary organizational changes are required heading into the new year. Make no mistake, these are difficult decisions which we did not take lightly.”

In February 2019, The Bernsteins took over the leases at 23 stores, including all 14 in the Kansas City area, and the Lenexa distribution center. A bulk of the stores are in Missouri and Kansas; the remaining six are in Iowa, Illinois, Colorado and Texas.

In August 2019, Beauty Brands re-entered a market, Avon, Indiana for the first time since the Bernsteins took control of the beauty and salon/spa retailer earlier this year. The company previously had Indianapolis-area locations, but those locations closed as part of the company's bankruptcy proceedings prior to the Bernstein's taking over.

In March 2020, Beauty Brands re-entered the Waco, Texas market, making it the 25th location.

== Ownership ==
In 2013, the company was purchased in part by Lyn Kirby, the former CEO of Ulta and the buyout group she works for based in California. Kirby bought the majority stake from Bob Bernstein. Bernstein will still have a minority interest in the company. The private-equity buyer and terms of the deal cannot be discussed by either party due to a confidentiality agreement.

Kirby served as CEO of the company, while Rich Bos replaced David Bernstein as president while Bernstein continued to serve as a consultant. Bos spent more than two decades with Ulta, ultimately as the vice president of merchandising.

In 2019, the founder of Beauty Brands, along with his son, former company CEO David Bernstein, won court approval in February to buy the Kansas City-based beauty and salon retailer, which filed for Chapter 11 bankruptcy in January 2019. The Bernsteins took over the leases at 23 stores, including all 12 in the Kansas City area, and the Lenexa distribution center. A bulk of the stores are in Missouri and Kansas; the remaining six are in Iowa, Illinois, Colorado and Texas. Moving forward, the Bernstein's plan to re-establish the fundamentals that initially made Beauty Brands successful, including its customer-first approach that offers the right products, service and attitudes, and a culture that embraces a family and team-building attitude.
