= Jovovich–Hawk =

Clothing brand

- Industry: Clothing company
- Founded: 2003
- Founder: Milla Jovovich; Carmen Hawk
- Defunct: September 2008
- Headquarters: Los Angeles
- Area served: Worldwide

Jovovich–Hawk was a clothing line created by models Milla Jovovich and Carmen Hawk in 2003. The atelier was based in Los Angeles, with pieces sold at Fred Segal in Los Angeles, Harvey Nichols, and over 50 stores around the world. Vogue magazine praised the line for its "girl-about-town cult status most designers spend years trying to achieve." Jovovich–Hawk had an annual turnover of $210 million.

In the September 2008 issue of Lucky magazine, Jovovich announced that Jovovich–Hawk had ceased operations.

== History ==
=== 2003–2005 ===
Jovovich–Hawk was established by Jovovich and Hawk in 2003. The two met over 13 years earlier as young models. Both women are adamant that the collections were for all ages and sizes, at times using Jovovich's mother as a size model. The collection was inspired by strong women, with a feminine vintage edge. Jovovich explained to the Taipei Times, "For us, it's about strong women or making women feel strong." Jovovich and Hawk managed all aspects of the clothing line from manufacturing to distribution. For one of their first collections, the two had sewn the clothes themselves and before 2005 did not hire others to sew for them.

The line's first collection, which amounted to eight pieces, caught the eye of John Eshaya, women's creative director for Ron Herman at Fred Segal. The pieces were sold exclusively at its stores; the line almost instantly sold out. The line's second season was equally, if not more successful, with Fred Segal re-ordering its stock midway through the season.

=== 2006 ===
For the 2006 spring collection, each piece had a name that paid homage to art, literature or film. The dress worn for the CS (California Style) photo shoot was known as the "Carly", after Carly Simon. There was also the "Vivian", a white lace minidress inspired by illustrations of early 20th century artist Henry Darger, and a floral piece named "Sissy", which Jovovich dubbed "a Carrie prom dress" after Sissy Spacek's role in the horror film Carrie.

In April, Jovovich and Hawk launched the Jovovich–Hawk clothing range at Harvey Nichols in London. In November, the Council of Fashion Designers of America (CFDA) and US Vogue nominated Jovovich–Hawk as for the CFDA/Vogue Fashion Fund Award. The award was founded three years ago and underwritten by Vogue, Barneys New York, Coach, Juicy Couture, Kellwood Company, Nordstrom and Theory, with additional support from Gucci. The winner would receive $200,000 as well as a year of industry guidance and support. Jovovich–Hawk was nominated as a finalist, with Doo-Ri Chung taking the top prize.

=== 2007–2008 ===
In 2007, Jovovich–Hawk participated in FashionWeekLive, a tour produced by IMG Fashion that also included collections by Anne Klein and Badgley Mischka. Jovovich–Hawk also teamed together with Mango to create a limited edition special collection for Spring 2007. The Jovovich–Hawk for MNG collection would feature 10 dresses with a 1960s theme.

In Jovovich's film, Resident Evil: Extinction, the costume she wore is a Jovovich–Hawk design. The shorts Alice, her character, wears are a variation on the "Alice Star" Shorts from the Spring 2007 collection. For the Fall 2007 collection, titled Le Petit Mort, the two drew inspiration from "everything from very classic Irving Penn to a Versailles whore in an alley in Paris."

In August 2007, Jovovich–Hawk participated with other designers to create a limited edition T-shirt for "Fashion Gives Back", Glamour's initiative to help benefit the "Malaria No More" organization. For every T-shirt sold, "Malaria No More" would donate bed nets to women in Tanzania. In early September, Jovovich-Hawk participated in the Mercedes-Benz Fashion Week in New York City to showcase their Spring 2008 line.

It was announced in late 2007 that Jovovich and Hawk signed a deal to design a diffusion collection for Target's Go International campaigns, following in the footsteps of Luella, Paul & Joe and Proenza Schouler. In the winter of 2007, Jovovich and Hawk shot a TV commercial for the collection in Los Angeles which was then shown during the New York Mercedes Benz Fall '08 Fashion Week in February 2008. The collection debuted on March 2, 2008.

=== Ceasing of operations ===
Jovovich–Hawk ceased operations as of mid-2008.

Jovovich explained that the business folded because of increased demands on both her and Hawk's time, and because the business simply grew too big for them. "It was actually really amazing when we were very private and doing everything in-house, sewing all the clothes in-house, but as soon as the orders got too big and we had to outsource, it was disaster with production companies and factories. I mean, we just couldn't handle it," Jovovich said. "We were two artist girls who didn't have our business together." Jovovich further explained, "I'm an artist. I'm not someone who can deal with shipping rates and taxes." She considers their Target line the final farewell to the public. "We were like, all right, let's end on a high note." Jovovich plans to design again on a smaller scale in the future.
