= Kasia Struss =

Polish model

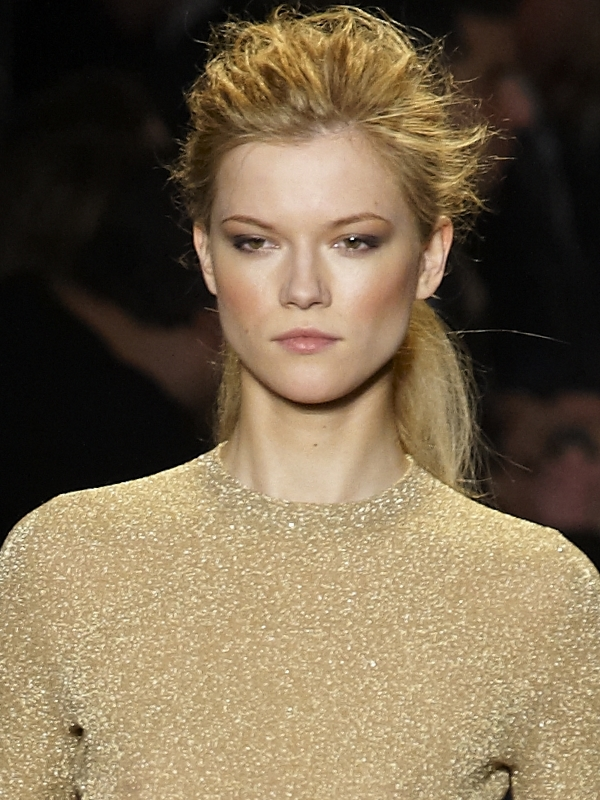
- Struss in 2009
- Born: Katarzyna Strusińska; 23 November 1987 (age 38); Ciechanów, Poland
- Children: 1
- Modeling information
- Height: 1.79 m (5 ft 10 1/2 in)
- Hair color: Brown
- Eye color: Hazel
- Agency: Elite Model Management (New York); Next Model Management (Paris, London); Women Management (Milan); View Management (Barcelona); Scoop Models (Copenhagen); Modelwerk (Hamburg); PARS Management (Munich); D'VISION (Warsaw); METRO Models (Zurich)

Katarzyna Strusińska (born 23 November 1987 in Ciechanów, Poland), known professionally as Kasia Struss, is a Polish model. Vogue Paris named her one of the top 30 models of the 2000s decade. Throughout her whole career she has appeared on 12 Vogue covers, 1 of them being Vogue Italia and has walked 422 runway shows.

== Career ==
Struss was discovered in 2005 by a local talent scout after sending her pictures to a local Polish teen magazine. She went on to finish high school in her home town of Ciechanów before signing with an agency called Avant Management. Avant has been Kasia’s mother agency for over 10 years. Style.com ranked her as one of the top 10 newcomers of that season. Struss has appeared in various magazines, including Vogue, Numéro, W, V, Dazed & Confused, and Ten Magazine.

She has walked the runway for Marc Jacobs, Viktor & Rolf, John Galliano, Versace, Kenzo, Diesel, DKNY, Burberry Prorsum, Louis Vuitton, Alessandro Dell'Acqua, Sonia Rykiel, Gareth Pugh, Julien Macdonald, Victoria's Secret and many more. In 2007/2008, Struss opened shows for Nina Ricci, Dries Van Noten, Doo.Ri, Giambattista Valli, PHI, Costume National, Balenciaga, Yves Saint Laurent, Jil Sander, Sinha Stanic, Jill Stuart, Loewe, and Wunderkind, and closed shows for Jil Sander, Chloé, Giambattista Valli, Thakoon, Richard Chai, Christopher Kane, and Doo.Ri. In the Spring/Summer fashion week 2010 she was the third most booked model, after Liu Wen and Constance Jablonski, who placed first and second respectively.

Struss has shot ad campaigns for Gucci, Dolce & Gabbana, Christian Dior, Valentino, Miu Miu, Hugo Boss, Costume National, Kenzo, Bottega Veneta, Alberta Ferretti, Chloé, Mulberry, Pringle of Scotland, Jil Sander, H&M, Express and Costume National.

In the Spring/Summer 2009 season, Struss and fellow model and friend Vlada Roslyakova were tied for walking the most shows that season, both of them walked 72 shows. Vogue Paris cited her in their "30 Models of the Decade".

She is currently considered an 'Industry Icon' on Models.com.

== Personal life ==
She gave birth to a daughter, Alice, in August 2018 and now is currently staying in New York City.
