= Bang Your Head =

Bang Your Head may refer to:

- "Bang Your Head" (song) or "Metal Health", a song by Quiet Riot
- "Bang Your Head", a song by Milla from The Divine Comedy
- Bang Your Head!!!, a rock and metal festival in Balingen, Germany
