= Milla Jovovich =

American actress (born 1975)

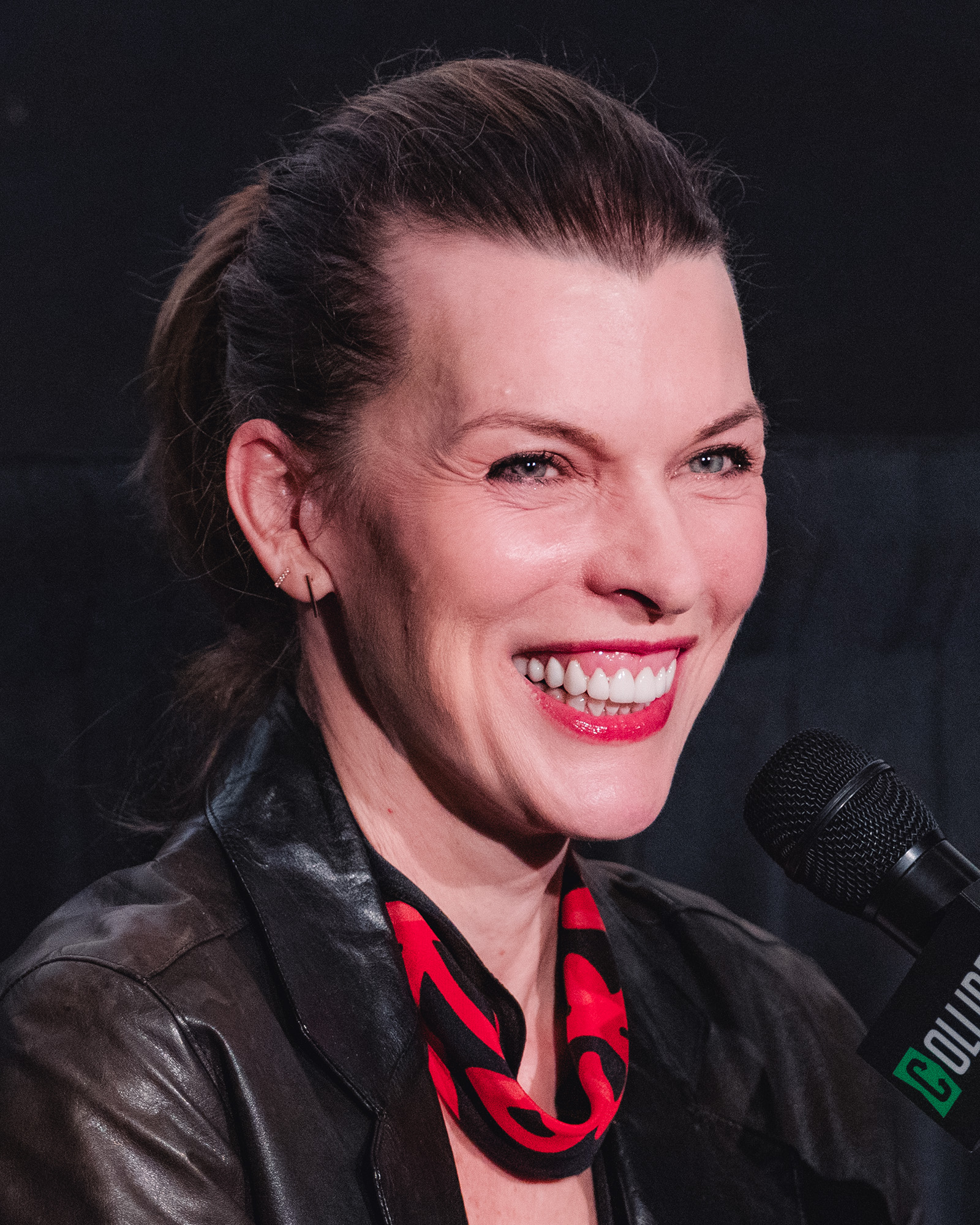
- Jovovich in 2026
- Born: Milica Bogdanovna Jovović; December 17, 1975 (age 50); Kyiv, Ukrainian SSR, Soviet Union
- Citizenship: US (since 1994)
- Occupations: Actress; model
- Years active: 1987–present
- Spouses: Shawn Andrews (m. 1992; ann. 1992); Luc Besson (m. 1997; div. 1999); Paul W. S. Anderson (m. 2009)
- Children: 3, including Ever Anderson
- Mother: Galina Loginova
- Website: www.millaj.com

Milica Bogdanovna Jovović (Note: In this name that follows East Slavic naming customs, the patronymic is Bogdanovna and the family name is Jovović. Jovovich has no middle name. She has sometimes been assigned the name Natasha, but this is in fact her cousin's name.) (Note: Serbian Cyrillic: Милица Богдановна Јововић; Russian: Милица Богдановна Йовович, romanized: Militsa Bogdanovna Yovovich; Ukrainian: Милиця Богданівна Йовович, romanized: Mylytsia Bohdanivna Yovovych) (born December 17, 1975), known professionally as Milla Jovovich (/ˈmiːlə ˈjoʊvəvɪtʃ/ MEE-lə YOH-və-vitch), is an American actress and former model. Her starring roles in numerous science fiction and action films led the music channel VH1 to deem her the "reigning queen of kick-butt" in 2006. In 2004, Forbes determined that she was the highest-paid model in the world.

Born in Kyiv, Ukrainian SSR, Soviet Union, and raised in Los Angeles, Jovovich began modeling when Herb Ritts photographed her for the cover of the Italian magazine Lei in 1987. Richard Avedon featured her in Revlon's "Most Unforgettable Women in the World" advertisements. In 1988, she made her screen debut in the television film The Night Train to Kathmandu and appeared in her first feature film, Two Moon Junction.

Jovovich gained attention for her role in the 1991 romance film Return to the Blue Lagoon. She was considered to have a breakthrough with her role in the 1997 French science-fiction action film The Fifth Element, written and directed by Luc Besson. Jovovich and Besson married that year but soon divorced. She starred as Joan of Arc in Besson's The Messenger: The Story of Joan of Arc (1999). From 2002 to 2017, she portrayed Alice in the action horror film franchise Resident Evil, which became the highest-grossing film series to be based on video games.

Jovovich released her debut album, The Divine Comedy, in 1994, and a follow-up, The People Tree Sessions, in 1998. She continues to release demos for other songs on her official website and frequently contributes to film soundtracks. In 2003, she co-created the clothing line Jovovich–Hawk, which ran until 2008, with model Carmen Hawk.

== Early life and family ==
Milica Bogdanovna Jovovich was born on December 17, 1975, in Kyiv, then the capital of the Ukrainian SSR, Soviet Union. She is the daughter of Galina (née Loginova), a Russian actress, and Bogdan Jovović, a Montenegrin Serb doctor. Galina's parents were from Tula. Jovovich spent most of her early childhood in Moscow, Galina's native city. Jovovich has stated that she was born in the Ukrainian SSR "pretty much by accident" and that she has no memories of her early years there; however, Jovovich "remember[s] a lot" about her life in the Russian SFSR.

In 1980, the family moved to London and then to Sacramento, California, before settling in Los Angeles seven months later. Galina and Bogdan divorced soon after their arrival. In 1988, Bogdan had a relationship with an Argentine woman, with whom he had a son. Due to her parents' divorce years before, Jovovich saw little of her half brother.

In Los Angeles, Galina tried to get acting jobs but found little success because of language barriers. She eventually resorted to cleaning houses to earn money. Galina and Bogdan both served as cooks and housekeepers for filmmaker Brian De Palma. Bogdan was convicted and imprisoned for participating in the largest health-insurance fraud ever investigated. He was given a 20-year sentence in 1994 but was released in 1999. Jovovich has stated, "Prison was good for him. He's become a much better person. It gave him a chance to stop and think."

Jovovich attended public schools in Los Angeles, becoming fluent in English in three months. She was teased by classmates for coming from the Soviet Union. She has stated, "I was called a commie and a Russian spy. I was [never] accepted into the crowd." At the age of 12, Jovovich left the seventh grade to focus on modeling, which she had started at the age of nine. According to Jovovich, she was rebellious during her early teens, engaging in drug use, shopping-mall vandalism, and credit-card fraud. She became a naturalized US citizen in 1994.

== Career ==
=== Early roles and hiatus (1985–1996) ===
Galina had "raised her to be a movie star." In 1985, Galina enrolled Jovovich in acting classes; when her acting jobs picked up, Jovovich started attending school for young actors rather than regular school. In 1988, Jovovich appeared in her debut professional film role as Samantha Delongpre in the romantic thriller Two Moon Junction. Later that year, she appeared in the made-for-television film as Lily McLeod in The Night Train to Kathmandu. She had several roles in television series, including Paradise (1988), Married... with Children (1989), and Parker Lewis Can't Lose (1990).

At the age of 15, Jovovich was cast as the lead in Return to the Blue Lagoon (1991), opposite Brian Krause. Given her age and beauty, she was often compared to Brooke Shields, another child model-turned-actress, who had starred in The Blue Lagoon (1980). The role was controversial as, like Shields, Jovovich appeared nude in the film. Jovovich was nominated for "Best Young Actress Starring in a Motion Picture" at the 1991 Young Artist Awards, and "Worst New Star" at the 1991 Golden Raspberry Awards. In 1992, Jovovich co-starred with Christian Slater in the comedy Kuffs. Later that year, she portrayed Mildred Harris in the Charlie Chaplin biographical film Chaplin. In 1993, she acted in Richard Linklater's film Dazed and Confused. She played Michelle Burroughs, the on-screen girlfriend to Pickford (played by her then-boyfriend Shawn Andrews). Strongly featured in promotions for the film, Jovovich was upset to find her role much reduced in the released film. Discouraged, she took a hiatus from acting roles, moving to Europe.

=== Breakthrough (1997–2001) ===
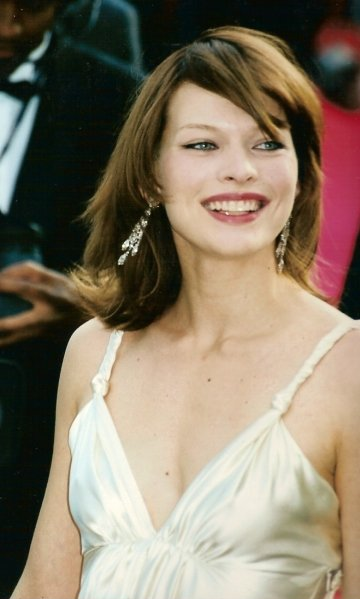
Jovovich attended the 2000 Cannes Film Festival.

Jovovich returned to acting in 1997 with a lead role in the French science-fiction action film The Fifth Element, alongside Bruce Willis and Gary Oldman. This was written and directed by Luc Besson. She portrayed Leeloo, an alien who helps to save the planet. Jovovich said she "worked like hell: no band practice, no clubs, no pot, nothing" to acquire the role and impress Besson. Jovovich co-created and mastered an alien fictional language of over 400 words for her role. She wore a costume that came to be known as the "ACE-bandage" costume; the body suit designed by Jean-Paul Gaultier was made of medical bandages. The Fifth Element was selected as the opening film for the 1997 Cannes Film Festival, and its worldwide box office gross was over $263 million, more than three times its budget of $80 million. The Fifth Element was often praised for its visual style; critic James Berardinelli wrote, "Jovovich makes an impression, although her effectiveness has little to do with acting and less to do with dialogue". Jovovich was nominated for "Favorite Female Newcomer" at the Blockbuster Entertainment Awards and "Best Fight" at the MTV Movie Awards. The film inspired a video game and a planned Leeloo action figure, but the figure was never released due to licensing problems. In a 2003 interview, Jovovich said Leeloo was her favorite role.

In 1998, Jovovich appeared in Spike Lee's drama He Got Game, as abused prostitute Dakota Burns; she acted with Denzel Washington and Ray Allen. In 1999, she appeared in the music video for the song "If You Can't Say No" by Lenny Kravitz. That year she returned to the action genre playing the title role in The Messenger: The Story of Joan of Arc, under direction of Luc Besson. She cut her hair short and wore armour in several extensive battle scenes. Jovovich received generally good reviews for her performance. The historical drama did moderately well at the box office, gaining $66 million worldwide. In 2000, Jovovich appeared as the troubled Eloise in The Million Dollar Hotel, a film based on a concept story by Bono of the band U2 and Nicholas Klein. Directed by Wim Wenders, Jovovich starred alongside Jeremy Davies and Mel Gibson; she provided vocals on the film's soundtrack. That year she also played bar owner Lucia, in the British western film The Claim (2000). This was followed by a supporting role as the evil Katinka in the comedy Zoolander (2001).

=== International success (2002–2009) ===
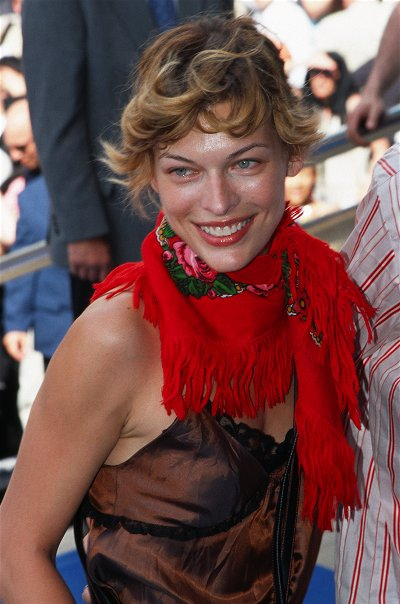
Jovovich at the 2002 Cannes Film Festival

In 2002, Jovovich starred in the horror-action film Resident Evil, released in the United States on March 15, 2002, and based on the Capcom video game series of the same name. She portrayed Alice, the film's heroine, who fights a legion of zombies created by the Umbrella Corporation. Jovovich had accepted the role because she and her brother Marco had been fans of the video game franchise. Jovovich had trained in karate, kickboxing, and combat-training, and had performed all the stunts required in the film, except for a scene that would involve her jumping to a cement platform, which her management deemed too dangerous. The film was commercially successful, grossing US$17 million on its opening weekend; it eventually made US$40 million domestically and $102 million worldwide. Later, she portrayed the manipulative gang wife Erin in No Good Deed (2002), Nadine in the romantic comedy You Stupid Man (2002), punk rocker Fangora ("Fanny") in Dummy (2003), and provided a guest voice on the television series King of the Hill. The role of Fangora in Dummy allowed Jovovich to act in film with Oscar-winning Adrien Brody, who was a friend prior to filming. Jovovich found it easy to identify with this role because she felt Fangora possessed similar qualities to the actress's own life.

In 2004, Jovovich reprised the role of Alice in the sequel to Resident Evil, Resident Evil: Apocalypse. The role required her to do fight training for three hours a day, in addition to the three months prior to filming in which she had "gun training, martial arts, everything". Apocalypse received even more negative reactions from the critics than the first film, but it was an even greater commercial success, ranking number one at the box office. Following the release of the film, Jovovich was unhappy with the critical results and director Alexander Witt's effort. She noted during an interview that year that her large action films take care of the commercial part of her career, while she acts in "independent little films that never come out" to appease her artistic side, and "It's a good balance". The following year, she was featured in Gore Vidal's faux trailer remake of Caligula, as Drusilla. In 2006, Jovovich's film, the science fiction/action thriller Ultraviolet, was released on March 3. She played the title role of Violet Song jat Shariff, a role that also involved heavily choreographed fight sequences. It was not screened for critics, but when reviewed, it was critically panned and failed at the box office, grossing US$31 million worldwide. Also in 2006, Jovovich starred in the independent thriller .45, with Scottish actor Angus Macfadyen.

In 2007, Jovovich reprised her role as Alice in Resident Evil: Extinction, the third of the Resident Evil series. The film grossed an estimated $24 million on its opening weekend, topping the box-office gross for that week. In 2009, Jovovich starred in David Twohy's A Perfect Getaway with Kiele Sanchez, Timothy Olyphant, and Steve Zahn. The film is a thriller about a newlywed couple (Milla and Zahn) on their honeymoon in Hawaii. Reviews for the film were mostly positive; while The Hollywood Reporter felt that Jovovich gave a "fairly subtle performance", The Globe and Mail noted that she and "[...]Kiele Sanchez manage to bring some dramatic tension to the frightened-girlfriend moments". A Perfect Getaway garnered modest box office returns. Jovovich starred in the science-fiction thriller The Fourth Kind, as a psychologist in Alaska who uses hypnosis to uncover memories from her patients of alien abduction. While the film was largely panned by critics, it made US$47.71 million in cinemas worldwide. Also in 2009, Jovovich posed nude in a black-and-white photoshoot for the Purple Fashion magazine.

=== Recent works (2010–present) ===
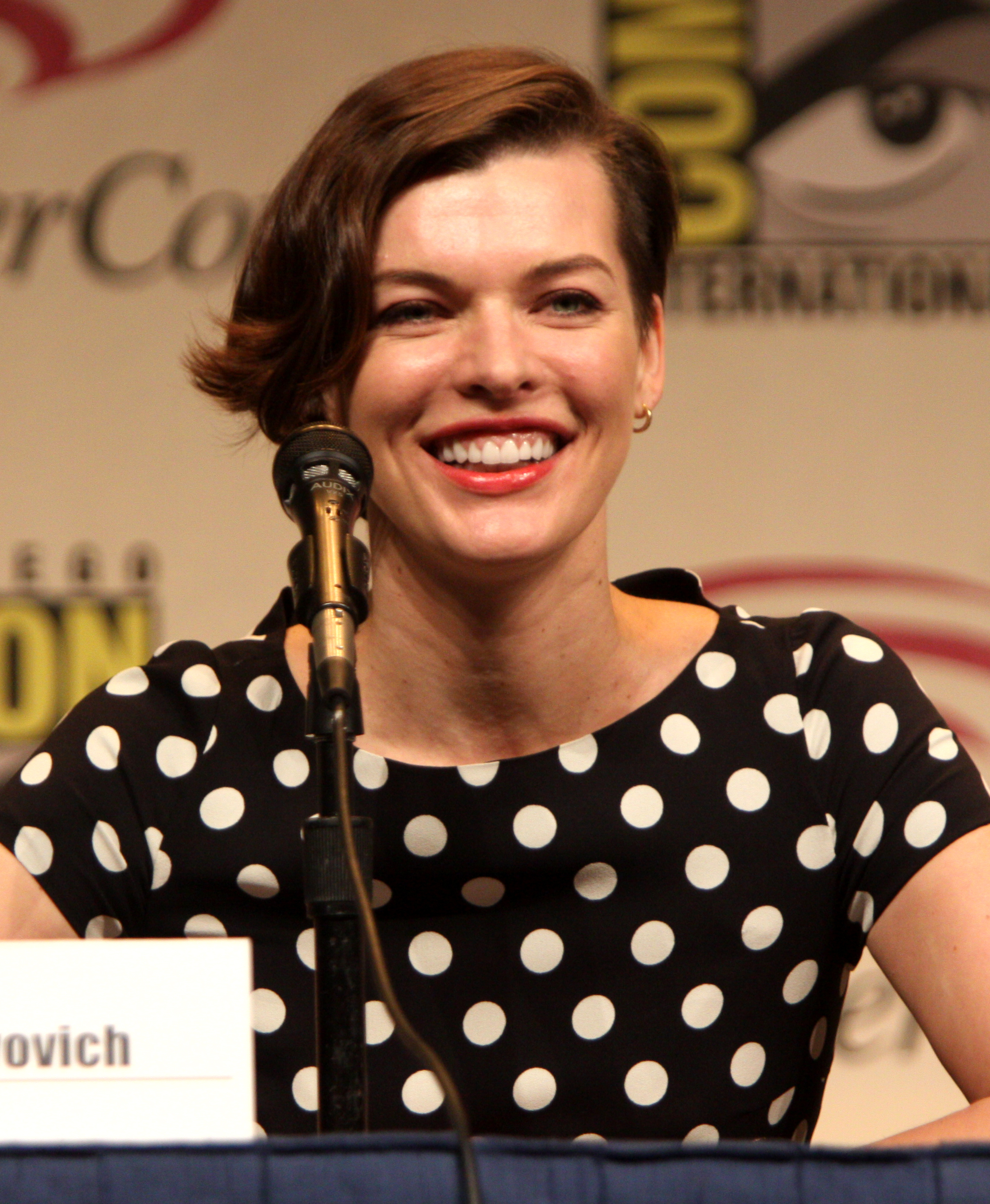
Jovovich attended the 2012 WonderCon promoting Resident Evil: Retribution.

In 2010, Jovovich returned as Alice in the fourth movie of the Resident Evil series, Afterlife, which was directed by her husband, Paul W. S. Anderson, and portrayed the mother of a promiscuous and troubled high school student in the independent coming-of-age dramedy Dirty Girl, which premiered at the Toronto Film Festival, opposite Juno Temple, William H. Macy, Mary Steenburgen, and Tim McGraw. In its review for the latter film, The Hollywood Reporter found Jovovich to be "terrific" in what it described as a "sweet [and] sassy period comedy with a Juno sensibility and the soul of a Little Miss Sunshine". Jovovich played the wife of a jailed arsonist in Stone, a psychological thriller co-starring Robert De Niro and Edward Norton. Filming began in May 2009 at the recently closed Southern Michigan Correctional Facility in Jackson, Michigan. The film was released in late 2010 to a mixed response. Nevertheless, The A.V. Club noted that Jovovich was "particularly good as a breathy femme fatale who seduces De Niro with a mere change in inflection".

Jovovich starred in Paul W. S. Anderson's romantic action adventure film The Three Musketeers, as Milady de Winter, in 2011, alongside Matthew Macfadyen, Logan Lerman, Ray Stevenson, Luke Evans, Orlando Bloom, and Christoph Waltz. After the lackluster response for Musketeers, Jovovich criticised Summit Entertainment for not "promoting [the film] properly" as a "family film" in the United States. Deadline Hollywood reported that Summit responded: "She doesn't know what she's talking about and we don't know where she's coming from." She would next headline the little-seen psychological thriller Faces in the Crowd, which was written and directed by Julien Magnat; in it, she plays the survivor of a serial killer's attack that leaves her suffering from a condition called prosopagnosia, which renders her unable to recognize faces. Sight and Sound remarked that the film suffered from "a central performance not quite strong enough to win Jovovich recognition as a dramatic actress". Also in 2011, Jovovich appeared as a Ukrainian con artist in Famke Janssen's directorial debut film Bringing Up Bobby, alongside Marcia Cross, and starred in the romantic comedy Lucky Trouble, which was her Russian-language film debut.

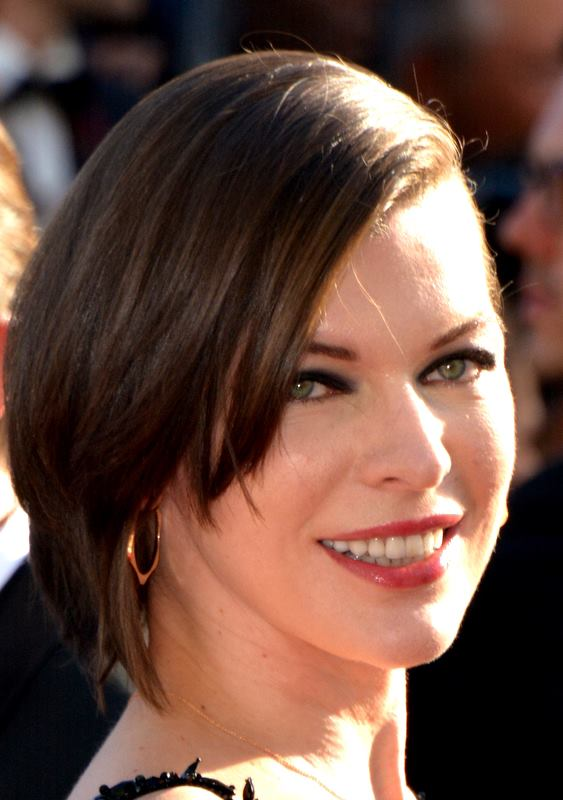
Jovovich at the 2016 Cannes Film Festival

Jovovich returned to her role as Alice in the fifth installment of Resident Evil for Resident Evil: Retribution (2012). She played an ambitious woman and the second wife of the leader of a motorcycle club in 2014's Cymbeline, a film version of the eponymous play by William Shakespeare, and in 2015's Survivor, she took on the role of a Diplomatic Security Service/Foreign Service officer at the US Embassy in London. Both films received a video on demand release in North America, despite theatrical runs abroad. Jovovich made a cameo appearance reprising the role of villain Katinka in 2016's Zoolander 2. Resident Evil: The Final Chapter (2016), the sixth and final film of the Resident Evil franchise, starred Jovovich as Alice as she continues her vengeance against Umbrella for the death of her allies and the catastrophe they have caused. Time Out in its review for the film noted: "While the franchise has slackened into dependably dumb post-apocalyptic thrills, star Milla Jovovich has only gotten better, seasoning her long-legged athleticism with a commanding stare". The Final Chapter was the highest-grossing film in the franchise, earning over US$312 million worldwide.

In Shock and Awe (2017), Jovovich played the wife of an investigator working on the reasons behind the Bush Administration's 2003 invasion of Iraq, starring opposite Woody Harrelson and Tommy Lee Jones. In Future World (2018), she obtained the role of a drug lord, alongside James Franco, who also directed the film. While reviewers felt Jovovich was "underused" in Shock and Awe, Future World holds a 0% approval rating on review aggregator website Rotten Tomatoes, based on 9 reviews. Jovovich starred as the administrator of an island-bound reform school in the fantasy film Paradise Hills (2019), the directorial debut of Alice Waddington. She also played the evil Vivienne Nimue, the Blood Queen in the Hellboy reboot movie, released in 2019.

Jovovich is the co-founder and owner of the production company Creature Entertainment.

== Other endeavors ==
=== Music ===
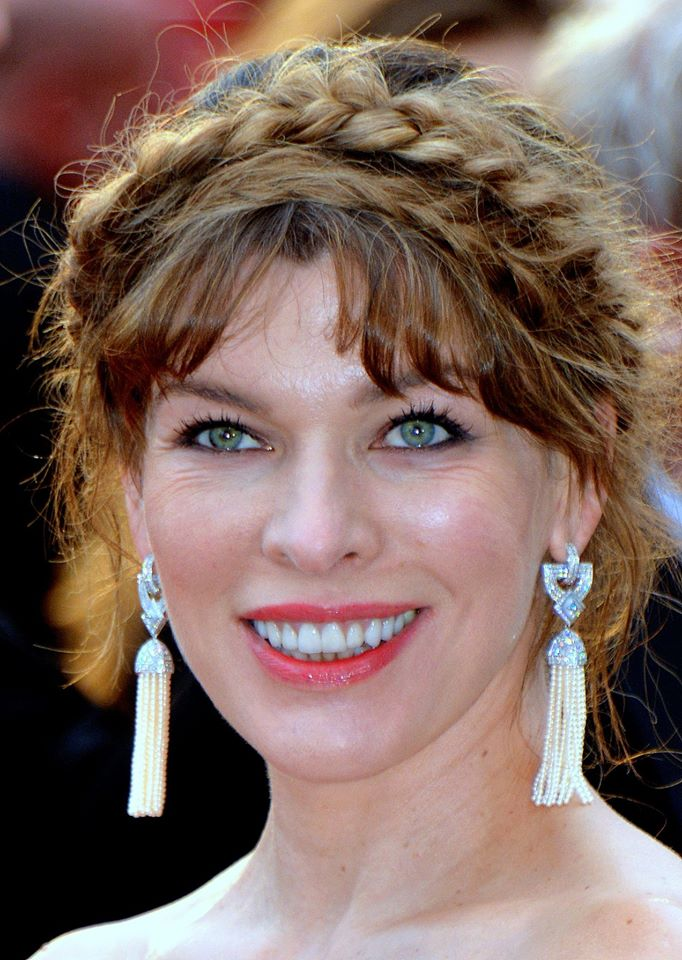
Jovovich in 2019

Jovovich had begun working on a music album as early as 1988, when she was signed by SBK Records after the company heard a demo she recorded. In August 1990, she asserted in an interview that the then-forthcoming album would be "a mix between Kate Bush, Sinéad O'Connor, This Mortal Coil, and the Cocteau Twins." After it was initially presented by SBK strictly as a pop album, Jovovich protested, insisting on using her personal poetry for lyrics and recording her own instrumental material. Jovovich had written the lyrics and composed the music of the songs when she was fifteen, except a cover of a Ukrainian folk song, "In a Glade". In April 1994, billed under her first name, she released The Divine Comedy, a title that was a reference to the epic poem by Dante Alighieri of the same name. Jovovich had chosen the title after seeing Russian artist Alexis Steele's proposed cover artwork sketch for the then untitled album. Jovovich found that the sketch had "all the struggle that I'm singing about. It is the divine comedy." The Divine Comedy was well received by critics, and features pop-infused traditional Ukrainian folk songs that led to comparisons with Tori Amos and Kate Bush. John McAlley of Rolling Stone called the album "remarkable", "strikingly mature and rich in invention", and as featuring "angst-laced poetry with vivid melodies and arrangements that find a common spirit in synth pop, European folk and psychedelic dream rock".

Jovovich released the track "The Gentleman Who Fell (Before The Court)", with an accompanying music video, as the sole single from the album. The music video was originally directed by Lisa Bonet and featured Harry Dean Stanton, but Jovovich, unsatisfied with the results, decided to film another video. The second video for "The Gentleman Who Fell", a homage to Maya Deren, was directed by Kate Garner and Paul Archard and was subsequently played on MTV. Jovovich toured the United States and Canada during most of 1994 to promote the album, opening for Toad the Wet Sprocket, The Philosopher Kings, and Crash Test Dummies, as well as playing smaller acoustic sets. Jovovich had opted to perform in smaller and more intimate settings, turning down a musical appearance on Saturday Night Live. Jovovich has also been collaborating musically with longtime friend and musician Chris Brenner, who co-wrote with her on the Divine Comedy Album and who was the musical coordinator for the supporting tour. She and Brenner met in 1993 and have since worked together on several ventures. Following The Divine Comedy, she expressed interest in releasing a second album, having had ten songs ready for a future recording that was intended for a mid-1996 release.

In May 1999, Jovovich, along with Chris Brenner, formed an experimental band called "Plastic Has Memory", in which she wrote and composed the songs, sang, and played electric guitar. The band was "[m]uch heavier and darker than the vaguely Ukrainian folk-sounding elements of her first album", and it had a similar sound to a grunge and trip hop Portishead. "Plastic Has Memory" played about a dozen shows in Los Angeles and New York City for a potential Virgin Records album release, one of which Mick Jagger had attended. But though "Plastic Has Memory" was featured on Hollywood Goes Wild!, a benefit celebrity compilation album, the group never formally released any albums, and had disbanded as of 2021.

Jovovich has contributed tracks to soundtracks of several of her own films, including The Million Dollar Hotel (2000) and Dummy (2002), and for others films such as Underworld (2003) produced by musician Danny Lohner, who was the bass player in Nine Inch Nails for many years. Her song "The Gentlemen Who Fell" is on The Rules of Attraction soundtrack of 2002. In 2001, Jovovich joined many celebrities whose vocals were featured in a cover of "We are Family" to raise money for the American Red Cross. She has appeared as guest vocalist on the song "Former Lover" on Deepak Chopra's album, A Gift of Love II: Oceans of Ecstasy (2002) and Legion of Boom (2004) by The Crystal Method.

Beginning in 2003, Jovovich worked with musician Maynard James Keenan, of Tool and A Perfect Circle, on his Industrial side project Puscifer, contributing vocals to the track "REV 22:20", which was featured on various film soundtracks in its original or a remixed form. In January 2009, she collaborated with Maynard and Danny Lohner on the Puscifer track called, "The Mission". She performed the song at the first live Puscifer performance on February 13, 2009, in Las Vegas, Nevada. Danny Lohner, and longtime music collaborator Chris Brenner record and perform with Jovovich, who has made several highly praised appearances.

A new single called "Electric Sky" was released on May 18, 2012, and presented at the Life Ball. In 2017, she collaborated in the single "Attention of Ernest Shalubin". Jovovich writes songs which she refers to as "demos", freely downloadable from her website with license to remix the tracks and reserved right to sell and issue them.

=== Modeling ===
Jovovich's early work with Herb Ritts, Richard Avedon, and Peter Lindbergh led to her success in advertising, bringing the young model contracts. Since then, she has been featured on more than 100 magazine covers, including Vogue, Cosmopolitan, Elle, Glamour, Marie Claire, Harper's Bazaar, and GQ.

She has walked for Balmain, Versace, Fendi, Trussardi, Alessandro Dell'Acqua, Costume National, Iceberg, Anna Sui, Dries van Noten, Ann Demeulemeester, Marc Jacobs, Miu Miu, Salvatore Ferragamo, Missoni, Blumarine, Jil Sander, and Jean Paul Gautier. She has been part of campaigns for Banana Republic, Christian Dior, Jimmy Choo, Prada, Isabel Marant, Celine, Guess?, Chanel, Tommy Hilfiger, Tiffany & Co., Roberto Cavalli, Damiani, Donna Karan, Gap, Versace, Calvin Klein, DKNY, Coach, Giorgio Armani, H&M, and Revlon. Since 1998, Jovovich has been an "international spokesmodel" for L'Oréal cosmetics. She was referred to in a minor cameo in Bret Easton Ellis's novel Glamorama, a satire of society's obsession with celebrities and beauty.

Jovovich was said to be designer Miuccia Prada's muse in 2002; a 2003 article claimed she was Gianni Versace's "favourite supermodel". In 2004, Jovovich topped Forbes magazine's "Richest Supermodels of the World" list, earning a reported $10.5 million, and in 2006, Jovovich was picked up by Mango, a Spanish clothing line, as their new spokesmodel and is featured in their advertising campaigns; she is in advertisements for Etro. She has said that "Modeling was never a priority" and that the money she earns enables her "to be selective about the creative decisions [she] make[s]".

In 2012, Jovovich was hired as the new "face" of a global advertising campaign for wristwatch and jewelry retailer Jacob & Co. In 2018, Jovovich became the "face" of a global advertising campaign for Balmain.

In 2019, Jovovich joined more than one hundred models who signed a petition to help protect Victoria's Secret models against sexual misconduct.

=== Fashion design ===
Jovovich and fellow model Carmen Hawk launched a line of clothing called Jovovich–Hawk in 2003. The pair opened a showroom in New York City's Greenwich Village on September 13, 2005. All of the dresses for Jovovich-Hawk line were designed by herself and her partner Carmen Hawk. The atelier is based in Los Angeles, but pieces were at Fred Segal in Los Angeles, Harvey Nichols, and over 50 stores around the world. Vogue praised the line for its "girl-about-town cult status most designers spend years trying to achieve". In November 2006, the Council of Fashion Designers of America (CFDA) and US Vogue nominated Jovovich-Hawk for the CFDA/Vogue Fashion Fund Award. Jovovich-Hawk was nominated as a finalist, although Doo-Ri Chung took the top prize. In 2007, Jovovich and Hawk designed the costume for Jovovich's character Alice in Resident Evil: Extinction. Alice's shorts are a variation on the "Alice Star" Shorts from the Spring 2007 collection. Later, Jovovich-Hawk signed a deal to design a diffusion collection for Target's Go International campaign, following in the footsteps of Luella, Paul & Joe, and Proenza Schouler. In late 2008, Jovovich and Hawk mutually agreed to end the business due to increased demands on their time. Jovovich explained, "I'm an artist. I'm not someone who can deal with shipping rates and taxes".

== Public image ==
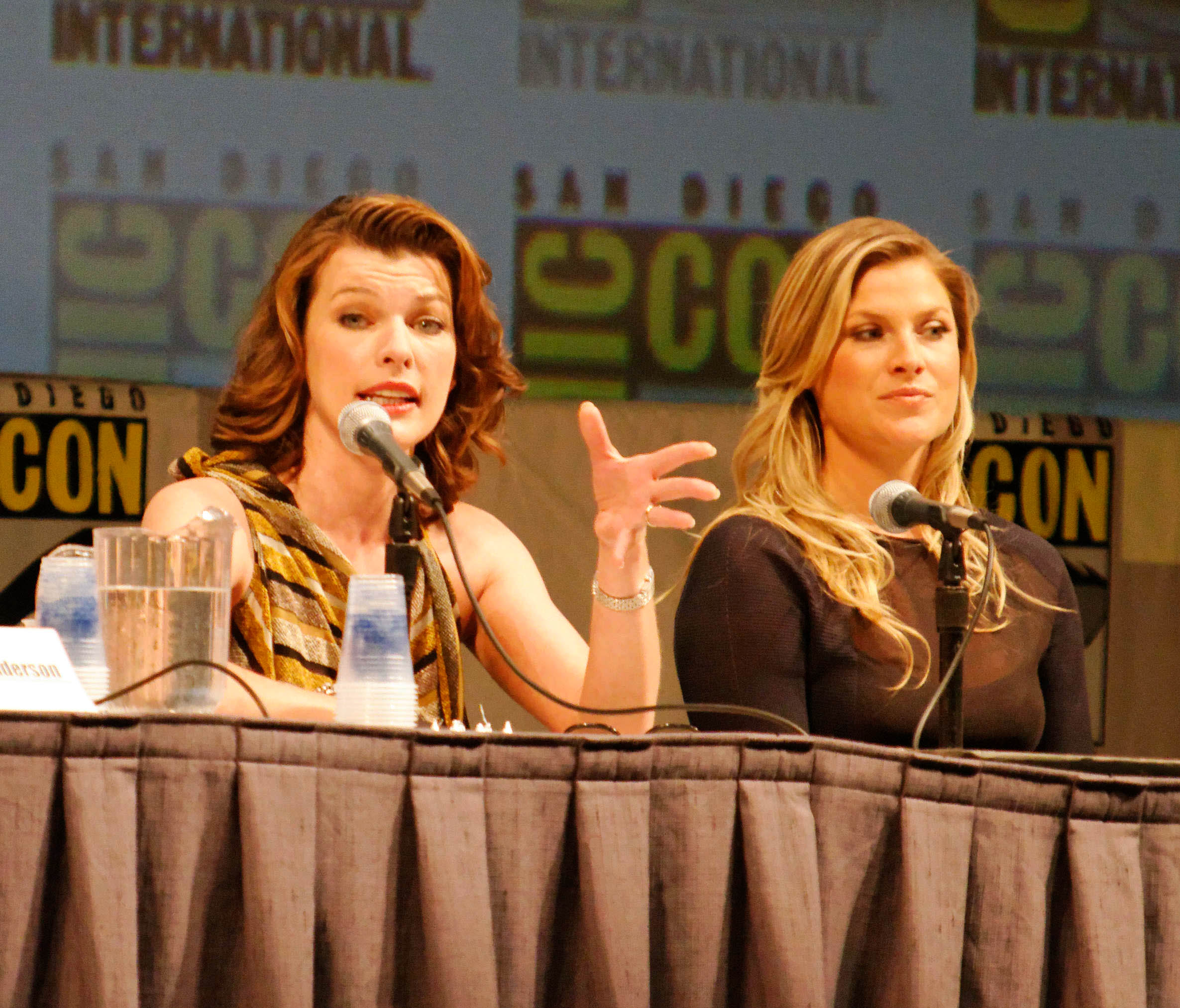
Milla Jovovich and Ali Larter promoted Resident Evil: Afterlife at the 2010 San Diego Comic-Con.

Jovovich has been noted for her careers as a model, singer, and actress. Music channel VH1 has referred to her as the "reigning queen of kick-butt" for her roles in various sci-fi and action films and Rebecca Flint Marx of Allmovie said that despite the negative critical response for the Resident Evil films, the franchise has turned Jovovich into an "A-list action star". Her action roles have given her a geek following for which MTV said she was "Every Geek's Dream Girl".

In 2004, Jovovich was ranked No. 69 on Maxim magazine's "Top 100 Hot List", ranked No. 82 in 2005 and ranked No. 21 in 2010. Maxim also named her No. 11 on their list of "Hottest Nerd Crushes". In 2008, she was ranked No. 90 on Ask Men's Top 99 Women of 2008 List. In 2011, Jovovich attended and sang at the birthday celebration of Mikhail Gorbachev. She gave a speech thanking Gorbachev, saying that when she and her family left the Soviet Union in 1980, they were sure that they would never see their relatives again but they have been reunited.

== Personal life ==
=== Relationships ===
Jovovich married on-screen boyfriend Shawn Andrews in 1992 while filming Dazed and Confused. Andrews was 21 and Jovovich was 16; the marriage was annulled by her mother two months later. Shortly after the annulment, Jovovich moved to Europe with her friend and musician Chris Brenner where she met and lived with her new boyfriend, ex-Jamiroquai bassist Stuart Zender, in London from May 1994 to October 1995.

She married The Fifth Element director Luc Besson in 1997 in Las Vegas, where they went skydiving directly after the ceremony. They divorced in 1999. In 2000, she briefly dated Red Hot Chili Peppers guitarist John Frusciante, saying she fell in love with him after hearing his album Niandra LaDes and Usually Just a T-Shirt six years earlier. Between 1998 and 2001, she befriended the young poet and musician Anno Birkin, as mutual inspiration behind many of their compositions. Jovovich became romantically involved with Birkin just before his death in a car accident on November 8, 2001.

After starring in Resident Evil (2002), Jovovich dated its director Paul W. S. Anderson, who proposed to her in 2003. The two were "engaged on-and-off for four years" before becoming a couple again early in 2007. They married on August 22, 2009. On November 3, 2007, Jovovich gave birth to their first child, daughter Ever Anderson, at Cedars-Sinai Medical Center in Los Angeles, California. Their second child, a daughter, was born on April 1, 2015, also at Cedars-Sinai Medical Center. In 2019, Jovovich revealed she was pregnant with her third daughter after miscarrying two years prior. She gave birth to their third daughter on February 2, 2020. Jovovich resides in Los Angeles and New York City.

=== Lifestyle ===
She speaks fluent English and Russian and some French and Serbian. She was brought up in a Russian household and referred to the role of Russian culture in her life when she stated in 2005:

"I have a Russian mother, she was a famous actress in the USSR (Galina Loginova). And the first books, which I read, were in Russian. I was raised in the atmosphere of the Russian classical theatre school. The art, built on the system of Stanislavsky – that's the most realistic art. And the modern cinema stands on the same principle. A Russian person wants to find the truth. This is the base of the Russian culture. I never forget it, especially since I have Russian roots".

When asked if she still feels Russian after having left Russia at a young age, Jovovich replied, "Definitely. I still speak Russian. I speak it with my daughter. I read her Russian stories and poems. My roots are very important—they make me who I am". Speaking about her early years, Milla noted the importance of education in her life, "...my mom raised me in the traditions of her country. For example, I never spent hours sitting before a TV and always read a lot. And I believe that education, intellect and intelligence are a huge part of the beauty of Russian women."

Jovovich has advocated the legalization of cannabis and appeared in a spread and on the cover for High Times. In an article published in 1994, she said that her only vices were cigarettes and cannabis. She practices yoga and meditates often to live a healthy lifestyle. Unaffiliated with any specific religion, she prays and considers herself a "spiritual person". Jovovich enjoys playing the guitar and writing poems and lyrics for songs.

== Filmography ==
Key
| † | Denotes films that have not yet been released |

=== Film ===
| Year | Title | Role | Notes | Ref. |
|---|---|---|---|---|
| 1988 | Two Moon Junction | Samantha Delongpre | | |
| 1991 | Return to the Blue Lagoon | Lilli Hargrave | | |
| 1992 | Kuffs | Maya Carlton | | |
| 1992 | Chaplin | Mildred Harris | | |
| 1993 | Dazed and Confused | Michelle Burroughs | | |
| 1997 | The Fifth Element | Leeloo de Sabat | | |
| 1998 | He Got Game | Dakota Burns | | |
| 1999 | The Messenger: The Story of Joan of Arc | Joan of Arc | | |
| 2000 | The Claim | Lucia | | |
| 2000 | The Million Dollar Hotel | Eloise | | |
| 2001 | Zoolander | Katinka Ingaborgovinanana | | |
| 2002 | Dummy | Fangora "Fanny" Gurkel | | |
| 2002 | Resident Evil | Alice Reis | | |
| 2002 | No Good Deed | Erin | | |
| 2002 | You Stupid Man | Nadine | | |
| 2004 | Resident Evil: Apocalypse | Alice Reis | | |
| 2005 | Needlework Pictures Presents Francesco Vezzoli in Gore Vidal's 'Caligula' | Julia Drusilla | Short film | |
| 2006 | Ultraviolet | Violet Song jat Shariff | | |
| 2006 | .45 | Kat | | |
| 2007 | Resident Evil: Extinction | Alice Reis | | |
| 2008 | Palermo Shooting | Herself | Uncredited | |
| 2009 | A Perfect Getaway | Cydney Anderson | | |
| 2009 | The Fourth Kind | Dr. Abigail "Abbey" Tyler | | |
| 2010 | Stone | Lucetta Creeson | | |
| 2010 | Blood into Wine | Herself | | |
| 2010 | Resident Evil: Afterlife | Alice Reis | | |
| 2010 | Dirty Girl | Sue-Ann Edmondston | | |
| 2011 | Lucky Trouble | Nadya | | |
| 2011 | Bringing Up Bobby | Olive | | |
| 2011 | The Three Musketeers | Milady de Winter | | |
| 2011 | Faces in the Crowd | Anna Marchant | Also executive producer | |
| 2012 | Resident Evil: Retribution | Alice Reis | | |
| 2014 | Cymbeline | The Queen | | |
| 2015 | Survivor | Kate Abbott | | |
| 2015 | A Warrior's Tail | Savva | Voice role; English dub | |
| 2016 | Zoolander 2 | Katinka Ingaborgovinanana | | |
| 2016 | Resident Evil: The Final Chapter | Alicia Marcus / Alice Reis | | |
| 2017 | Shock and Awe | Vlatka | | |
| 2018 | Future World | The Drug Lord | | |
| 2019 | Paradise Hills | The Duchess | | |
| 2019 | Hellboy | Vivienne Nimue, the Blood Queen | | |
| 2019 | The Rookies | Senior Agent Bruce | | |
| 2020 | Monster Hunter | Captain Natalie Artemis | | |
| 2020 | Showbiz Kids | Herself | Documentary film | |
| 2024 | Breathe | Tess | | |
| 2025 | In the Lost Lands | Gray Alys | Also producer | |
| 2025 | World Breaker | Willa's Mother | | |
| 2025 | Protector | Nikki Halsted | Also producer | |
| TBA | Midnight † | Katarina | Post-production; also executive producer | |

=== Television ===
| Year | Title | Role | Notes | Ref. |
|---|---|---|---|---|
| 1988 | The Night Train to Kathmandu | Lily McLeod | Television film | |
| 1988 | Paradise | Katie | Episode: "Childhood's End" | |
| 1989 | Married... with Children | Yvette | Episode: "Fair Exchange" | |
| 1990 | Parker Lewis Can't Lose | Robin Fecknowitz | Episode: "Pilot" | |
| 2002 | King of the Hill | Serena Shaw | Voice; episode: "Get Your Freak Off" | |
| 2009 | Project Runway | Herself | Episode: "Around the World in Two Days" | |
| 2016 | Lip Sync Battle | Herself | Episode: "Milla Jovovich vs. Ruby Rose" | |
| 2018 | Robot Chicken | Nanny McPhee / Megan Hipwell / Mintie | Voice; episode: "We Don't See Much of That in 1940s America" | |
| 2027 | Heated Rivalry † | Dr. Galina Molchalina | Supporting role; season 2 | |

=== Video games ===
| Year | Title | Voice | Ref. |
|---|---|---|---|
| 1998 | The Fifth Element: The Video Game | Leeloo de Sebat | |
| 2019 | Contract Killer: Sniper | Milla | |
| 2020 | Monster Hunter World: Iceborne | Captain Natalie Artemis | |
| 2026 | Hitman: World of Assassination | Lilith Devereux | |

=== Music videos ===
| Year | Song | Artist | Ref. |
|---|---|---|---|
| 1998 | "If You Can't Say No" | Lenny Kravitz | |
| 2013 | "I Wanna Be a Warhol" | Alkaline Trio | |
| 2016 | "Signal" | Sohn | |
| 2018 | "Withorwithout" | Parcels | |

== Discography ==
=== Studio albums ===
| Title | Details |
|---|---|
| The Divine Comedy | Released: April 5, 1994; Label: SBK, EMI; Format: Digital download, CD |
| The People Tree Sessions | Released: 1998; Label: SBK, Capitol, EMI; Format: Digital download, CD |

=== Singles ===
| Title | Year | Album |
|---|---|---|
| "Gentleman Who Fell" | 1994 | The Divine Comedy |
| "Bang Your Head" | 1994 | The Divine Comedy |
| "It's Your Life" | 1994 | The Divine Comedy |
| "Electric Sky" | 2012 | Non-album single |

=== Soundtrack appearances ===
| Title | Year | Soundtrack |
|---|---|---|
| "Satellite of Love" (with the MDH Band) | 2000 | The Million Dollar Hotel: Music from the Motion Picture |
| "Gentleman Who Fell" | 2002 | The Rules of Attraction – Soundtrack |
| "Shein VI Di l'Vone" (with Botanica Bulgar Ensemble) | 2002 | Dummy – Soundtrack |
| "Mezinka" (with Botanica Bulgar Ensemble) | 2002 | Dummy – Soundtrack |
| "Rocket Collecting" (with Danny Lohner) | 2003 | Underworld – Soundtrack |
| "Underneath the Stars" (Renholdër Mix) (ft. Maynard James Keenan, cover of The Cure) | 2009 | Underworld: Rise of the Lycans – Soundtrack |
| "The Mission" ("M" Is for Milla Mix) (ft. Puscifer & Renholdër) | 2010 | Sound into Blood into Wine |
| "Proud Mary" (Ukrainian language version) | 2011 | Bringing Up Bobby – Soundtrack |

=== Compilation appearances ===
| Title | Year | Soundtrack |
|---|---|---|
| "On the Hill" (with Plastic Has Memory) | 2001 | Hollywood Goes Wild! |
| "Former Lover" (with Deepak Chopra) | 2002 | A Gift of Love II: Oceans of Ecstasy |
| "I Know It's You" (with The Crystal Method) | 2004 | Legion of Boom |
| "The Mission" (ft. Puscifer & Renholdër) | 2008 | "C" Is for (Please Insert Sophomoric Genitalia Reference Here) |
| "Introduction" (ft. Scroobius Pip) | 2011 | Distraction Pieces |

== Awards and nominations ==
| Award | Year | Category | Work / Nominee | Result | Ref. |
|---|---|---|---|---|---|
| Blockbuster Entertainment Awards | 1998 | Favorite Actress – Newcomer | The Fifth Element | Nominated | |
| Golden Raspberry Awards | 1992 | Worst New Star | Return to the Blue Lagoon | Nominated | |
| Golden Raspberry Awards | 1998 | Worst Supporting Actress | The Fifth Element | Nominated | |
| Golden Raspberry Awards | 2000 | Worst Actress | The Messenger: The Story of Joan of Arc | Nominated | |
| Golden Raspberry Awards | 2013 | Worst Actress | Resident Evil: Retribution | Nominated | |
| Golden Raspberry Awards | 2026 | Worst Actress | In the Lost Lands | Nominated | |
| Golden Schmoes Awards | 2002 | Best T&A of the Year | Resident Evil | Nominated | |
| Hollywood Film Awards | 2010 | Spotlight Award | Stone | Won | |
| Jupiter Award | 2012 | Best International Actress | The Three Musketeers | Nominated | |
| MTV Movie & TV Awards | 1998 | Best Fight | The Fifth Element | Nominated | |
| Russian National Movie Awards | 2012 | Best Russian Actress of the Year | Milla Jovovich | Nominated | |
| Russian National Movie Awards | 2014 | Best Russian Actress of the Decade | Milla Jovovich | Nominated | |
| Saturn Award | 1998 | Best Supporting Actress | The Fifth Element | Nominated | |
| Saturn Award | 2003 | Best Actress | Resident Evil | Nominated | |
| Scream Awards | 2008 | Best Science Fiction Actress | Resident Evil: Extinction | Won | |
| Scream Awards | 2010 | Best Horror Actress | The Fourth Kind | Nominated | |
| Scream Awards | 2011 | Best Science Fiction Actress | Resident Evil: Afterlife | Won | |
| Stinkers Bad Movie Awards | 1997 | Worst Supporting Actress | The Fifth Element | Nominated | |
| Stinkers Bad Movie Awards | 1999 | Worst Actress | The Messenger: The Story of Joan of Arc | Nominated | |
| Stinkers Bad Movie Awards | 1999 | Worst On-Screen Female Hairstyle | The Messenger: The Story of Joan of Arc | Nominated | |
| Teen Choice Awards | 2012 | Choice Movie Actress: Action | The Three Musketeers | Nominated | |
| Young Artist Award | 1991 | Best Leading Young Actress in a Feature Film | Return to the Blue Lagoon | Nominated | |
