= The People Tree Sessions =

The Peopletree Sessions

Studio album by Milla Jovovich
- Released: September 1998
- Studios: Peopletree (Los Angeles); SINC (San Francisco)
- Genres: Electronic; experimental
- Length: 57:17
- Label: Peopletree
- Producers: H. Loops; Danny Elder

Milla Jovovich chronology
The Divine Comedy (1994)	The Peopletree Sessions (1998)

The Peopletree Sessions is the second studio album by American actress and model Milla Jovovich, released in September 1998 by Peopletree Recordings. The material on the album was largely recorded at the Los Angeles home studio of producer and Peopletree label head David Turin. Jovovich and her musical collaborator Chris Brenner have disowned the album as an unauthorized release.

== Background ==
Milla Jovovich and her frequent collaborator Chris Brenner were invited by producer David Turin (also known as Emit Bloch, and credited on The Peopletree Sessions as H. Loops) to work on music with him after being introduced to Turin by his wife Kate Garner, who had previously worked with Jovovich on some photography shoots. The songs on The Peopletree Sessions were recorded in home studios in Los Angeles and San Francisco, with most of the material being recorded in Turin's Hollywood Hills apartment. Speaking about the album's production, Turin said: "We did it in hallways, bathrooms, straight into the jack in the back of the Mac, over the phone ... and then passed the tracks around to all sorts of home studios, even e-mailing them as mp3s, just to see what other people would do with them in the comfort of their own homes."

== Release ==
Professional ratings
Review scores
Source	Rating
AllMusic	3/5 stars
The Guardian	3/5 stars

The Peopletree Sessions was issued in September 1998 by Turin's Peopletree Recordings label, from which the album derives its name, and was made available for purchase exclusively via mail order through the label's website. Jovovich afterwards disputed the release's legitimacy. Brenner similarly disavowed the album, which he said consisted of demos that were subsequently remixed and compiled into a Jovovich album without her consent, and stated that legal action had been taken to quell its distribution.

Two versions of the album were released. The first, the standard version, has a black cover art and includes sixteen tracks and one untitled hidden track. The second, labeled as the UK edition and issued by Cherry Red Records subsidiary Sidewinder Sounds, has a different orange cover art and adds the tracks "Hi, It's Milla", "Loose Weight", and "Queen of the Parade", while omitting the remix of "House of Spiders".

In a review for AllMusic, Dave Sleger described The Peopletree Sessions as "a 180-degree turnaround" from Jovovich's 1994 debut album The Divine Comedy, with a "do-it-yourself, in-home approach" and "dark, electro-urban, dadaistic" sound. Following its 2000 reissue, the album was chosen as the "Pop CD of the week" by The Guardian, whose critic Betty Clarke called it "so barking, it's great", while also noting, "The Sessions tag is a good indication of the half-finished nature of most of these songs, the experimental and just-having-a-laugh vibe the project has."

== Track listing ==
=== Standard edition ===
1. "Queen Electric" (Milica Jovović, David Turin, Chris Brenner, Danny Elder) – 3:37
2. "Flu with Adam" (Jovović, Turin, Brenner) – 3:50
3. "Sweetheart" (Jovović, Turin, Brenner, Elder) – 4:17
4. "DJ Puppy Ink" (Jovović, Elder) – 2:28
5. "I Tell" (Jovović, Turin, Brenner, Elder) – 3:19
6. "Going Down" (Jovović, Turin, Brenner, Elder) – 3:02
7. "Flu Acoustic" (Jovović, Turin, Brenner) – 6:18
8. "Purge" (Jovović, Turin, Brenner, Elder) – 3:22
9. "House of Spiders" (Jovović, Turin, Brenner) – 7:03
10. "Secret Society" (Jovović, Turin, Brenner, Elder) – 3:09
11. "Flu @ SINC" (Jovović, Turin, Brenner) – 2:44
12. "Separate Worlds" (Jovović, Turin, Brenner) – 2:45
13. "Separate Worlds" (Remix) (Jovović, Turin, Brenner) – 3:08
14. "Wake Baby" (Jovović, Turin, Brenner) – 3:55
15. "Saturday" (Jovović, Turin, Brenner) – 2:47
16. "House of Spiders" (Remix) (Jovović, Turin, Brenner) – 1:35
17. "Untitled" (Jovović, Turin, Brenner) – 4:02

=== UK edition ===
1. "Hi, It's Milla"
2. "Queen Electric" (Jovović, Turin, Brenner, Elder) – 3:37
3. "Flu with Adam" (Jovović, Turin, Brenner) – 3:50
4. "Sweetheart" (Jovović, Turin, Brenner, Elder) – 4:17
5. "DJ Puppy Ink" (Jovović, Elder) – 2:28
6. "I Tell" (Jovović, Turin, Brenner, Elder) – 3:19
7. "Going Down" (Jovović, Turin, Brenner, Elder) – 3:02
8. "Flu Acoustic" (Jovović, Turin, Brenner) – 6:18
9. "Purge" (Jovović, Turin, Brenner, Elder) – 3:22
10. "Secret Society" (Jovović, Turin, Brenner, Elder) – 3:09
11. "Flu @ SINC" (Jovović, Turin, Brenner) – 2:44
12. "Separate Worlds" (Jovović, Turin, Brenner) – 2:45
13. "Separate Worlds" (Remix) (Jovović, Turin, Brenner) – 3:08
14. "Wake Baby" (Jovović, Turin, Brenner) – 3:55
15. "Saturday" (Jovović, Turin, Brenner) – 2:47
16. "House of Spiders" (Jovović, Turin, Brenner) – 7:03
17. "Loose Weight"
18. "Queen of the Parade" (Remix)

Notes

- "Queen Electric" and "Saturday" share the same background music.
- "Flu Acoustic" is an acoustic version of "Flu with Adam".
- "Flu @ SINC" is another version of "Flu with Adam".
- "Queen of the Parade" (Remix) is another version of "Queen Electric".

== Personnel ==
Credits are adapted from the album's liner notes.

- Milla Jovovich – lead vocals, instruments, programming
- Chris Brenner – vocals, instruments, programming
- Danny Elder – instruments, programming, production, remixing, mastering
- Kate Garner – vocals, photography
- David Turin (also credited as H. Loops) – instruments, programming, production, executive production
- Adam, AM D'Funk, Farmer, Ezra G., Charles Goodan, Stephen Perkins, Summer Winkey, Nick Young – instruments, programming
- Sharlene Durfey – graphic art
