= Behnaz Sarafpour =

American fashion designer

- Born: 1969 (age 56–57); Tehran, Iran
- Education: Parsons School of Design
- Occupation: Fashion designer
- Known for: Women's apparel
- Website: behnazsarafpour.com

Behnaz Sarafpour (born 1969) is an Iranian-born American fashion designer, and fragrance designer. She had a ready-to-wear line of women's apparel bearing her name, Behnaz Sarafpour, Ltd. from 2001 until 2014, and has her own perfume line. Sarafpour has held design positions at Isaac Mizrahi, Narciso Rodriguez, Richard Tyler, Anne Klein, and Barneys New York. She has been based in New York City and Pound Ridge, New York.

== Early life and education ==
Sarafpour was born in 1969 in Tehran, Iran. She was raised in Philadelphia, Pennsylvania.

She attended Parsons School of Design (BFA 1992), where she was honored with the Golden Thimble Award. She interned at Anne Klein, studying under Narciso Rodriguez and Richard Tyler. Sarafpour's aesthetic is a layered look, often in the colors black, white, shades of grey, and metallics, and she likes a hand–dyed or hand-painted fabric. She likes to experiment with fabrics.

== Career ==
After graduation she designed for Isaac Mizrahi from 1994 to 1998. She later became a womenswear designer for the Barneys New York private apparel label from 1998 to 2003. In 2001, she founded her own label, and first sold it at Barneys New York.

In 2002, Sarafpour had her first runway show at New York Fashion Week, sponsored by Style.com. Other runway sponsors have included Moët & Chandon, Hewlett-Packard, Van Cleef & Arpels, and Tiffany & Co. Her Spring 2005 sponsor, Tiffany & Co., allowed her to present the collection at the jewelry company's 5th Avenue flagship store. In November 2006, Sarafpour designed a collection of clothing and accessories for Target Corporation's Go International. Sarafpour also minted a limited-edition lipstick for Lancôme and jeans for Scott Morrison's Earnest Sewn collection.

Sarafpour is a member of Council of Fashion Designers of America (CFDA). She has been nomination for the CFDA Swarovski/Perry Ellis Award for ready to wear apparel in 2003, 2004, and 2005. In 2013, she was awarded the Cooper Hewitt, National Design Award in fashion.

In 2007, Sarafpour was one of five designers whose work was chosen to feature in the Sportswear section of the Victoria and Albert Museum, London's New York Fashion Now exhibition. Sarafpour was honored at the White House in July 2010 as a finalist of the Smithsonian's National Design Award in the fashion design category.

== See also ==
- List of Iranian artists
