= Gentleman Who Fell =

Single by Milla Jovovich

Single by Milla Jovovich

from the album The Divine Comedy
- Released: March 1994
- Recorded: 1993
- Genre: Folk rock
- Length: 4:39
- Label: SBK
- Songwriters: Milla Jovovich, Richard Feldman, Mark Holden
- Producer: Richard Feldman

Milla Jovovich singles chronology
| "Gentleman Who Fell" (1994) | "It's Your Life" (1994) |

"Gentleman Who Fell" is the first single released by Milla Jovovich from her debut album, The Divine Comedy. It was released in March 1994 in the United Kingdom.

Written by Jovovich with Richard Feldman and Mark Holden, the single peaked at No. 21 on the Billboard Modern Rock Tracks chart, spending seven weeks on it. A review in that publication by Larry Flick called the recording an "utterly charming single" with a melody that was a "breath of fresh air".

== Track listing ==
1. "Gentleman Who Fell" – 4:39
2. "You Did It All Before" (Acoustic Version) – 3:58

== Charts ==
| Chart (1994) | Peak position |
|---|---|
| Canada Top Singles (RPM) | 72 |
| UK Singles (Official Charts) | 65 |
| US Modern Rock Tracks (Billboard) | 21 |
