= Tara Jarmon =

Canadian fashion designer

Tara Jarmon is a Paris-based canadien fashion designer. Born in Canada, she moved to Newport Beach, California in high school. Jarmon launched her self-titled clothing line over 30 years ago, which now spans more than 23 free-standing Tara Jarmon boutiques and 80 store-in-store locations throughout Europe and Asia. Jarmon attended The University of Southern California, but graduated from The American University of Paris. She resides in Paris. In May 2006, Jarmon designed a collection of affordable women's apparel and accessories for Target Corporation's Go International line.

Following the sale of her namesake brand to AMS industries in 2016, she decided to launch in 2018 a new brand named Mirae with her daughter Camille.
