= Go International =

Affordable women's apparel and accessories brand

Go International is a Target Corporation store brand that focuses on affordable apparel and accessories for women. Each season is created by a different designer who is already well known for their high-end collections and is only available for 90 days from its release.

== Designers ==
- Fiorucci (December 2005)
- Luella Bartley (January 2006)
- Tara Jarmon (May 2006)
- Paul & Joe by Sophie Albou (August 2006)
- Behnaz Sarafpour (November 2006)
- Proenza Schouler (February 2007)
- Patrick Robinson (May 2007)
- Libertine (July 2007)
- Alice Temperley (September 2007)
- Erin Fetherston (November 2007)
- Jovovich-Hawk (March 2008)
- Rogan (May 2008)
- Richard Chai (August 2008)
- Jonathan Saunders (October 2008)
- Thakoon Panichgul (December 2008)
- McQ by Alexander McQueen (March 2009)
- Tracy Feith (May 2009)
- Anna Sui (September 2009)
- Rodarte (December 2009)
- Jean Paul Gaultier (March 2010)
- Zac Posen (April 2010)
- William Rast (December 2010)
- Calypso St. Barth (June 2011)
- Missoni (September 2011)
- Jason Wu (February 2012)
- Neiman Marcus Holiday collection (December 2012)
- Prabal Gurung (February 2013)
- Phillip Lim (September 2013)
- Peter Pilotto (February 2014)
- TOMS (November 2014)
- Lilly Pulitzer (April 2015)
- Eddie Borgo (June 2015)
- Adam Lippes (August 2015) Announced
- Marimekko (April 2016)
- Victoria Beckham (April 2017)
