= Luella Bartley =

British fashion designer and journalist (born 1974)

- Born: 1974 (age 51–52); Stratford Upon Avon, England
- Education: Central Saint Martins College of Art and Design
- Label: Luella

Luella Dayrell Bartley MBE (born 1974) is an English fashion designer, magazine editor and former journalist based in the UK.

== Biography ==
A one-time journalist and fashion editor of British Vogue and Evening Standard newspaper, Bartley first attended the further education arts college, Warwickshire School of Arts, before gaining a place at the Central Saint Martins College of Art and Design and launched her eponymous fashion label "Luella" in 1999 with a collection entitled "Daddy, I want a Pony" at a friend's (Steve Mackey – bassist from Pulp) apartment. Bartley is a former roommate of artists Justine Frischmann and Mathangi Arulpragasam (M.I.A.). A year after her first showcase, she was awarded Britain's Young Designer of the Year award. Her designs are influenced by the British music scene and have been acclaimed for her quirky, punk inspired, often distinctly English style. Her LFW debut in February 2000 was the show "Daddy, who were the Clash?"

In 2002, the "Gisele" bag she designed from the best selling "Luella for Mulberry" edition was an instant success and revived the ailing Mulberry brand. This, in turn led to Club21, the Singapore-based retail group, investing in a global licensing agreement for Luella Bartley ready-to-wear and accessories.

In January 2006, Bartley was selected to launch Target's Go International line.

She has showcased her work several times during London Fashion Week. She returned to London for Spring/Summer 2007, after six and a half years based in New York and previously Milan fashion weeks. During the same week she opened her first store, on London's Brook Street.

In 2008, she launched a limited edition bag collection "Friends of Luella" in Hong Kong. Later that year, the British Fashion Council named Luella 'Designer of the Year', having been nominated previously for two consecutive years. Following on from this award, Luella was dubbed 'International Designer of the Year' by Elle Sweden in January 2009.

Wearers of her designs have included Kate Nash, Kelly Osbourne, Lily Allen, Amy Winehouse, Gwyneth Paltrow, Sienna Miller, Mischa Barton, Chloë Sevigny, Keira Knightley, Foxy Brown, Christina Aguilera, Reese Witherspoon, Cate Blanchett, Kate Bosworth, Alexa Chung, Pixie Geldof, Zooey Deschanel, and Princess Beatrice and Princess Eugenie. Bartley was announced to design the Liberty Christmas decor. Despite this, on 10 November 2009, it was reported that Luella had ceased trading. Bartley works as a celebrated artist currently showing at the Kristin Hjellegjerdw gallery in London

She was appointed Member of the Order of the British Empire (MBE) in the 2010 New Year Honours.

== Publications ==
- Luella's Guide to English Style' (2010)
