= Richard Chai =

American fashion designer

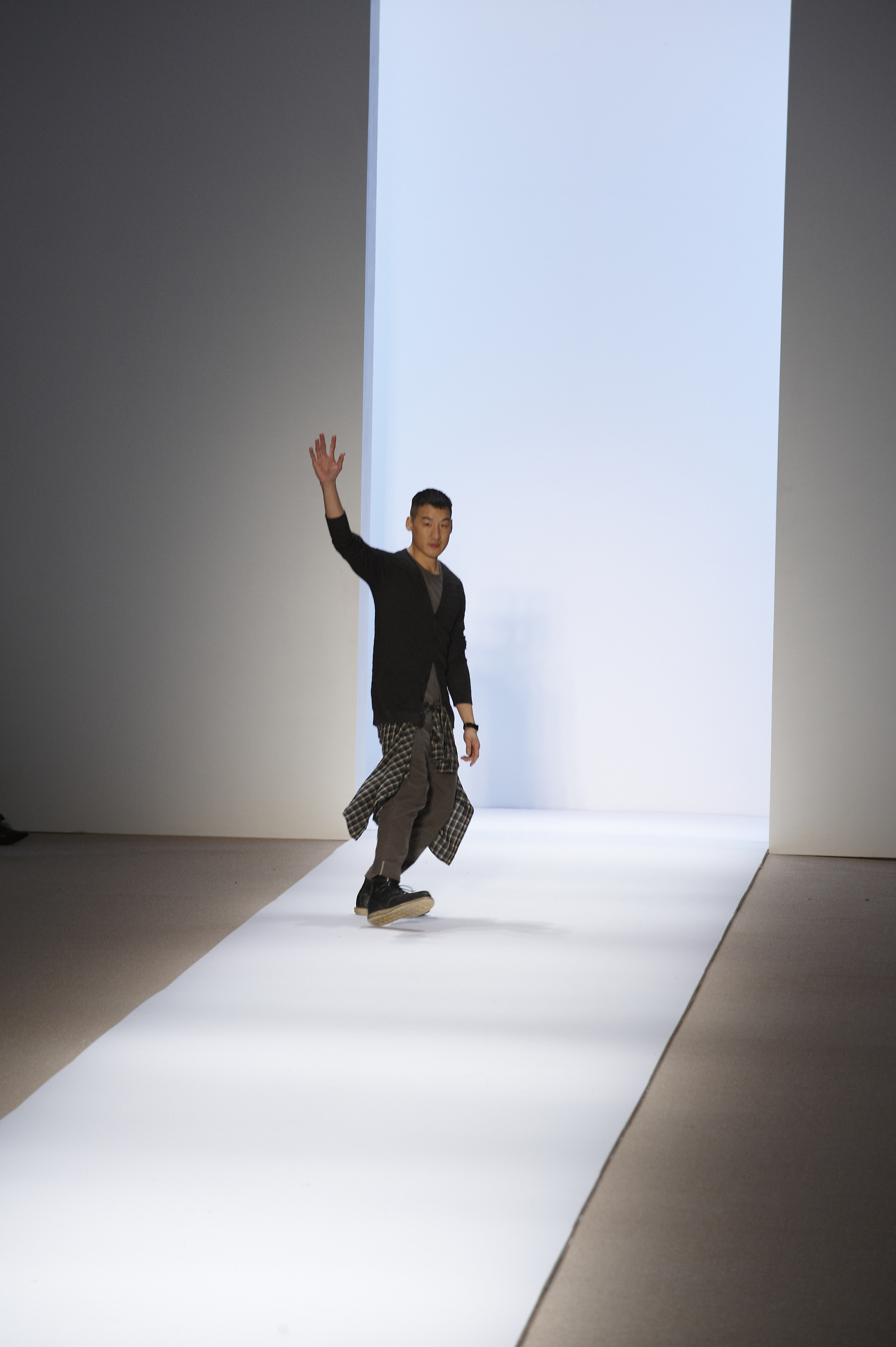
Richard Chai receives applause at the conclusion of his Fall/Winter 2010 show at New York Fashion Week, February 2010.

Richard Chai is an American fashion designer.

== Career ==
Chai creates clothes for an eponymous label. Before launching his own line, he designed for Marc by Marc Jacobs, and Cristiano Ronaldo for two labels, for underwear and socks from 2013 and then for shirts from 2014.

In 2008, he released a capsule line under Target's Go International.

=== Collaborations ===
Richard Chai partnered with design firm Snarkitecture for a new pop-up retail store underneath the Highline at 504 West 24th Street in Manhattan. The project entitled "Building Fashion" and conceived by BOFFO and Spilios Gianakopoulos aimed to promote collaborations between architecture and fashion. Snarkitecture's installation re-imagined the retail interior as a glacial cavern, hand carved from EPS foam. The store carried Chai's men's and women's collections and was open for 10 days in October 2010.

== Awards and nominations ==
- 2008 CFDA/Vogue Fashion Fund top 10 finalists
- 2010 Council of Fashion Designers of America Designer of the Year – Men's Wear

== See also ==
- Korean Americans in New York City
