= The Divine Comedy (Milla Jovovich album) =

Studio album by Milla Jovovich
- Released: April 5, 1994
- Studios: Albion (London); Metropolis (London)
- Genres: Folk rock; folk-pop
- Length: 45:24
- Label: SBK
- Producers: Rupert Hine; Richard Feldman

Milla Jovovich chronology
The Divine Comedy (1994)	The People Tree Sessions (1998)

Singles from The Divine Comedy
- 1. "Gentleman Who Fell" Released: 1994; 2. "Bang Your Head" Released: 1994; 3. "It's Your Life" Released: 1995

The Divine Comedy is the debut studio album by American actress and model Milla Jovovich, released on April 5, 1994, by SBK Records. She was billed as simply Milla for this release. The album is named after Dante Alighieri's Divine Comedy.

The Divine Comedy was met with positive reception by critics and peaked at number 23 on the Billboard Heatseekers Albums chart, while its lead single, "Gentleman Who Fell", reached number 21 on the Modern Rock Tracks chart. Jovovich toured North America throughout 1994 to promote the album, opening for Crash Test Dummies and Toad the Wet Sprocket, as well as playing smaller acoustic sets.

== Background and production ==
She was ... shuffled off to sing along with tracks laid down by producers who saw her as a potential looker out of whom they might be able to squeeze a couple quick European hits. She initially complied, then balked, defiantly insisting on recording her own material. The impasse was resolved in her favor; SBK eventually allowed its headstrong teen creative control, and those embarrassing early sessions never saw the light of day.

— Chris Willman, Los Angeles Times

Milla Jovovich began working on a music album as early as 1988, when she was signed by SBK Records after the company heard a demo she had recorded. After some scrapped early recording sessions with producers under whom Jovovich found her creative input limited, Rupert Hine and Richard Feldman were ultimately enlisted to produce, and SBK acquiesced to Jovovich's demand for creative control over her own album. Jovovich was the album's primary lyricist and songwriter, while the music on four songs was co-written with Feldman and Mark Holden. Jovovich also collaborated musically with longtime friend Chris Brenner, who, in addition to co-writing one song, later served as a musical coordinator and member of Jovovich's backing band for the album's supporting tour.

Jovovich titled the album The Divine Comedy after the 14th-century epic poem by Dante Alighieri of the same name, widely considered the preeminent work of Italian literature. She chose the title after seeing Russian artist Alexis Steele's proposed cover artwork sketch for the then-untitled album, explaining: "When I was first working on the sketch for the album cover my mom introduced me to a young Russian artist named Alexey Steele. I looked at his sketch for the cover and I saw that struggle—all the struggle that I'm singing about. It is the divine comedy."

== Music and lyrics ==
In August 1990, Jovovich asserted in an interview that the then-forthcoming album would be "a mix between Kate Bush, Sinéad O'Connor, This Mortal Coil and the Cocteau Twins". After it was initially presented by SBK strictly as a pop album, Jovovich protested, insisting on using her personal poetry for lyrics and recording her own instrumental material. Drawing inspiration from philosophy readings and her own Slavic background, Jovovich had written the songs when she was 16, with the exception of a Ukrainian folk song, "In a Glade", that she covered in her native tongue. Three songs were written by Jovovich during the period she spent shooting the film Dazed and Confused (1993); one, "The Alien Song (For Those Who Listen)", would be incorporated into the film itself, which features Jovovich performing a short rendition of the song. Describing her lyrics on The Divine Comedy as reflecting a mixture of "youth and experience", Jovovich said: "I was confused like any other 16-year-old is. There's this young woman just fighting to get out, but there's still a kid, you know—an experienced kid that's gone through a lot, that's read a lot of books and that knows a lot more than a lot of 40-year-olds do."

Musically, The Divine Comedy is predominantly acoustic, coupling Jovovich's "strong, emotional" vocals with guitars, flutes, mandolins, and dulcimers, among other instruments. Chris Willman of the Los Angeles Times called it an album of "acoustic-oriented, airy, folk-pop tunes", while Razor journalist Bret Love noted its "largely acoustic folk-rock" sound and "philosophical lyrics and earnest melodies", which earned Jovovich comparisons to musicians such as Tori Amos and Kate Bush.

== Release and promotion ==
"Gentleman Who Fell"
A 20-second audio sample of "Gentleman Who Fell", the album's lead single.

For The Divine Comedy, Jovovich was billed mononymously as Milla, which she attributed to her surname frequently being mispronounced. Before the album's release, SBK Records issued a promotional EP called Music from the Forthcoming Album 'The Divine Comedy', featuring five songs from the album: "Gentleman Who Fell", "It's Your Life", "Bang Your Head", "Clock", and "In a Glade". The Divine Comedy was released on April 5, 1994, peaking at number 23 on the Billboard Heatseekers Albums chart.

"Gentleman Who Fell" was released as the first single from The Divine Comedy. It reached number 21 on Billboard's Modern Rock Tracks chart. In the United Kingdom, where The Divine Comedy was released on June 6, 1994, "Gentleman Who Fell" peaked at number 65 on the UK Singles Chart, while in Canada, it reached number 72 on RPM's singles chart. A music video for the song, directed by Lisa Bonet and featuring Harry Dean Stanton, was produced, but Jovovich was unsatisfied with the results and decided to film another version. The second video paid homage to Maya Deren's short film Meshes of the Afternoon (1943) and was filmed in black and white. Later in 1994, "Bang Your Head" was released as a promotional single to radio, as was "It's Your Life" the following year.

The supporting tour for The Divine Comedy comprised three legs and 50 shows in total. The tour began with a small concert at the Borderline in London on February 1, 1994. The tour resumed in July with a first leg consisting of 22 shows at bars and cafés across North America. Jovovich had opted to perform in smaller and more intimate settings, turning down a musical appearance on Saturday Night Live. The second and third legs consisted of 14 North American shows each, during which Jovovich opened for the bands Crash Test Dummies and Toad the Wet Sprocket.

== Critical reception ==
Professional ratings
Review scores
Source	Rating
AllMusic	4/5 stars
Entertainment Weekly	B
Los Angeles Times	3/4 stars
NME	5/10
The Philadelphia Inquirer	3.5/4 stars
Rolling Stone	3.5/5 stars
The San Diego Union-Tribune	3/5
Select	4/5
SKY Magazine	5/5
Slant Magazine	4/5 stars

The Divine Comedy was released to positive reviews from music critics. In Rolling Stone, John McAlley praised the album as "remarkable" and "strikingly mature and rich in invention, counterpointing Milla's lovelorn, angst-laced poetry with vivid melodies and arrangements that find a common spirit in synth pop, European folk and psychedelic dream rock." Entertainment Weekly's Dimitri Ehrlich highlighted Jovovich as a gifted songwriter and melodist, noting "an ear for delicate, medieval tunes and aching drama that would make Tori Amos envious." Dan O'Kane of CD Review called her "a decent songwriter with a poetic style (in the Kate Bush vein) and a smoky, provocative voice", adding that the album's various "exotic flavors—pipes, panflute, Eastern strings, and chants—make this first effort interesting and different from the onslaught of grrrl rock." San Diego Union-Tribune critic Mikel Toombs stated that Jovovich "impressively keeps both her imagery and her import-implying vocals in check" and "supplies just the right touch of the dark drama suggested by the album's unnecessarily pretentious title, and gives all indications of a bright future."

Mike Joyce of The Washington Post wrote that Jovovich "is forever struggling with words and emotions on ... The Divine Comedy, forever trying to make sense of love or the lack of it. She never succeeds, of course, but her tenacity is what makes the album worth hearing. Evoking a curious combination of childlike innocence, Harlequin romance and hippie sentimentality, her songs are tone poems of a sort, inspired by vulnerability and wariness, sung in a small, plaintive, unguarded soprano. At times she seems hopelessly lovesick, a prime candidate for any heartbreaker's ruse, but on 'You Did It All Before,' 'Clock,' and 'Don't Fade Away' she sounds a lot older and wiser, no stranger to hurt and disillusionment." Let It Rock commented: "Her songs take form in fairytale poetry, as if she were some medieval storybook princess, held captive against her will in a Dragon's Lair. Authentic Russian acoustic instruments create a soundscape of delicate beauty, ethereal, yet soulful and heartfelt. An original."

Johnny Cigarettes was more ambivalent in NME, writing that The Divine Comedy lacked "a decent tune" despite Jovovich's "fine voice" and "intriguingly whimsical lyrics". In his Microsoft Music Central review, Ian Cranna said: "At times it's all too ethereal for its own good (though the second half is brighter and catchier), or a tad adolescent (she's still only 18). Milla already floats like a butterfly; now she needs to sting like a bee. Better will come."

== Legacy ==
Following The Divine Comedy, Jovovich expressed interest in releasing a second album, having had ten songs ready for a future recording that was intended for a summer 1997 release. However, Jovovich has yet to formally release a second album. Her 1998 studio album The People Tree Sessions was reportedly unauthorized, and Jovovich launched legal action in order for it to be taken off the market. In recent years, Jovovich has opted to release her new songs for free on her official website. With these demos, she extends to all listeners the right to remix the songs, but reserves the right to sell the songs, preventing unauthorized resale of her material.

"While it's now common for models and actors to try their hand at music," wrote Tom Demalon in a review for AllMusic, "the good results of The Divine Comedy are not as common ... Milla has a pleasant voice and above-average songwriting ability, and the songs are organic, light, airy concoctions that work well in their understated settings." In 2003, Slant Magazine named The Divine Comedy to their list of "50 Essential Pop Albums". Slant critic Sal Cinquemani said:

Though some of the singer's lyrics can err on the loopy side ... Milla's messages are mostly conveyed through passion, not words, a claim only the finest performers can make. The listener is transported into Milla's medieval faerie land of Russian folk influences and contemporary synth-pop via a series of eclectic yet seamless tracks like the mesmerizing "Charlie" and the dramatic "Don't Fade Away" ... Although many were quick to dismiss Milla for attempting to crossover into yet another industry (she has since gone on to headline the Resident Evil film franchise and continues to record music independently), The Divine Comedy stands as one of the best lost pop albums of the '90s.

"Gentleman Who Fell" appears on the soundtracks for The Leading Man and The Rules of Attraction; "It's Your Life" appears on the soundtrack for the Randal Kleiser film It's My Party. "In a Glade" plays on many of the in-game radios in the Oblivion Lost mod of the game S.T.A.L.K.E.R.: Shadow of Chernobyl, which takes place in Ukraine.

== Track listing ==
No.	Title	Writer(s)	Length
1.	"The Alien Song (For Those Who Listen)"	Milla Jovovich	4:45
2.	"Gentleman Who Fell"	Jovovich; Richard Feldman; Mark Holden	4:39
3.	"It's Your Life"	Jovovich; Feldman; Holden	3:45
4.	"Reaching from Nowhere"	Jovovich	4:10
5.	"Charlie"	Jovovich; Feldman; Holden	3:43
6.	"Ruby Lane"	Jovovich	4:36
7.	"Bang Your Head"	Jovovich; Feldman; Holden	3:23
8.	"Clock"	Jovovich	4:15
9.	"Don't Fade Away"	Jovovich	5:43
10.	"You Did It All Before"	Jovovich; Chris Brenner	3:58
11.	"In a Glade"	traditional; arranged by Feldman and Holden	2:27
Total length:			45:24

== Personnel ==
Credits are adapted from the album's liner notes.

Musicians

- Milla Jovovich – lead vocals, backing vocals (tracks 9, 10)
- Eric Bazilian – guitar (tracks 2, 7, 11), mandolin (tracks 2, 5), hammered dulcimer (tracks 5, 11), bouzouki (track 11)
- Curt Bisquera – percussion (track 7)
- Chris Brenner – backing vocals (track 10)
- Paul Buckmaster – string arrangement (track 3)
- Martha Davis – backing vocals (track 2)
- Richard Feldman – keyboards (tracks 2, 3, 5), arrangement (track 11)
- Rupert Hine – keyboards (tracks 1, 4, 6, 8, 9, 10), keyboard bass (tracks 1, 4, 8, 9, 10), percussion (tracks 4, 6, 9, 10), drums (tracks 4, 6), arrangement (tracks 1, 4, 6, 8, 9, 10), piano (track 9), backing vocals (track 9)
- Mark Holden – arrangement (track 11)
- Ethan James – harmonium (tracks 2, 5), hurdy-gurdy (track 7)
- Charles Judge – keyboards (tracks 2, 3, 5, 7, 11)
- Brian Kilgore – percussion (tracks 2, 3, 5, 7)
- Larry Klein – bass (tracks 2, 7)
- Hélène Labarrière – bass (tracks 1, 8)
- John Leftwich – bass (tracks 3, 5)
- Jamie Oldaker – percussion (track 7)
- Phil Palmer – acoustic guitar (tracks 4, 9, 10)
- Dean Parks – guitar (tracks 3, 5, 7, 11), mandolin (track 3), bouzouki (track 11), hammered dulcimer (track 11)
- Geoffrey Richardson – acoustic guitar (tracks 1, 6, 8), bamboo flute (track 1), violin (tracks 1, 6, 9, 10), viola (tracks 1, 6), penny whistle (tracks 1, 6, 10), mandolin (tracks 8, 10), kalimba (track 9), flute (track 10), ukulele (track 10)

Production

- Jamie Cullum – recording assistance
- Richard Feldman – production (tracks 2, 3, 5, 7, 11), engineering (tracks 2, 3, 5, 7, 11), mixing (tracks 2, 3, 5, 7, 11)
- Manu Guiot – mixing (tracks 2, 3, 5, 7, 11)
- Rupert Hine – production (tracks 1, 4, 6, 8, 9, 10)
- Mark Holden – co-production (tracks 2, 3, 5, 7, 11)
- Jon Ingoldsby – engineering (tracks 2, 3, 5, 7, 11)
- Patrice Lazareff – mixing assistance
- Lee Manning – engineering (tracks 2, 3, 5, 7, 11)
- Stephen W. Tayler – engineering (tracks 1, 4, 6, 8, 9, 10), mixing (tracks 1, 4, 6, 8, 9, 10)

Design

- Carla Leighton – design
- Henry Marquez – art direction
- Alexis Steele – painting
- Mario Testino – photography

== Charts ==
Chart (1994)	Peak position
US Heatseekers Albums (Billboard)	23
