= Doo-Ri Chung =

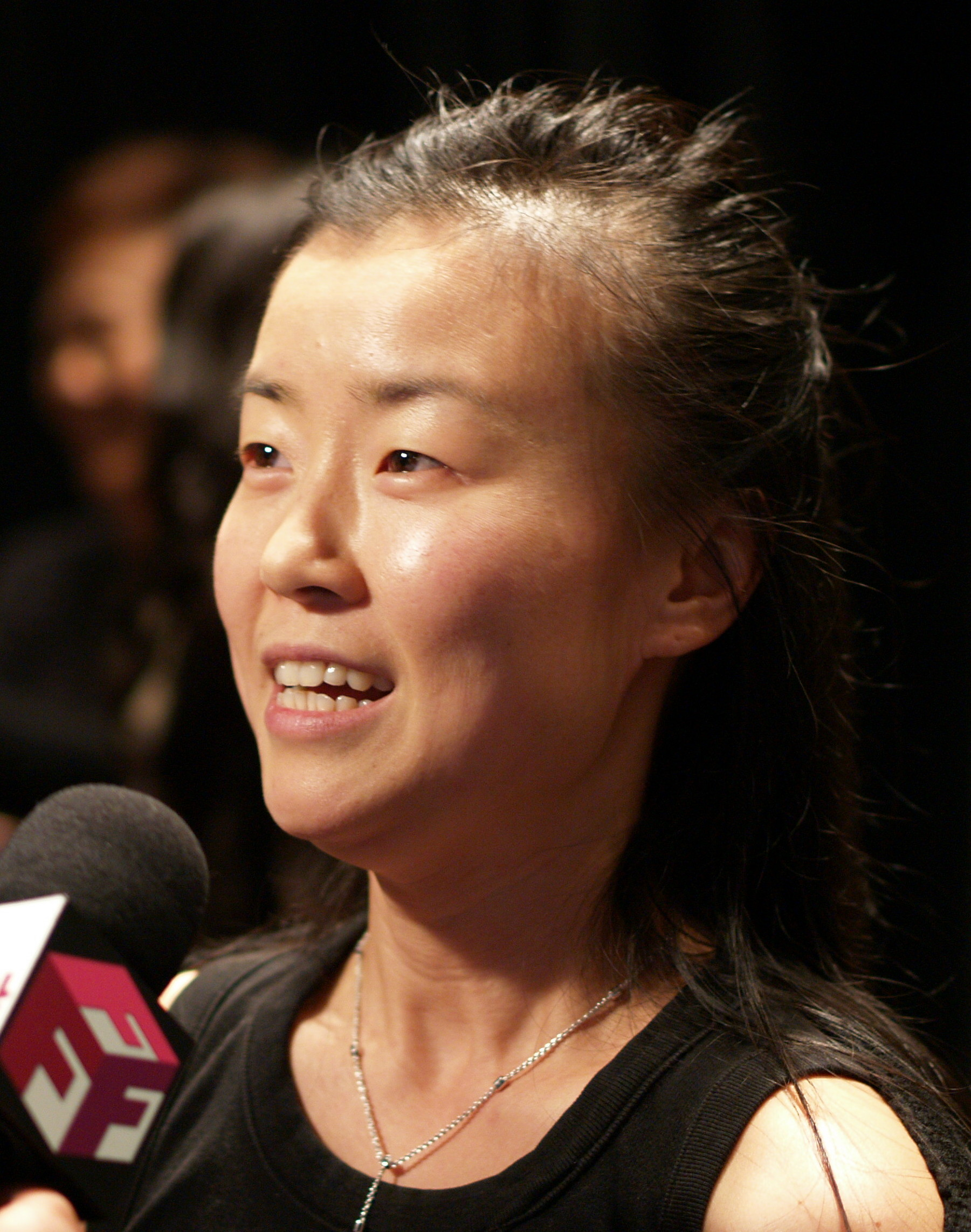
- Chung in September 2006
- Born: 1973 (age 52–53)
- Education: The New School (Parsons division)
- Label: Doo-Ri Chung
- Awards: 2006 Swarovski's Perry Ellis Award; 2006 Council of Fashion Designers of America/Vogue Fashion Fund Award

- Doo-Ri Chung
- Hangul: 정두리
- RR: Jeong Duri
- MR: Chŏng Turi

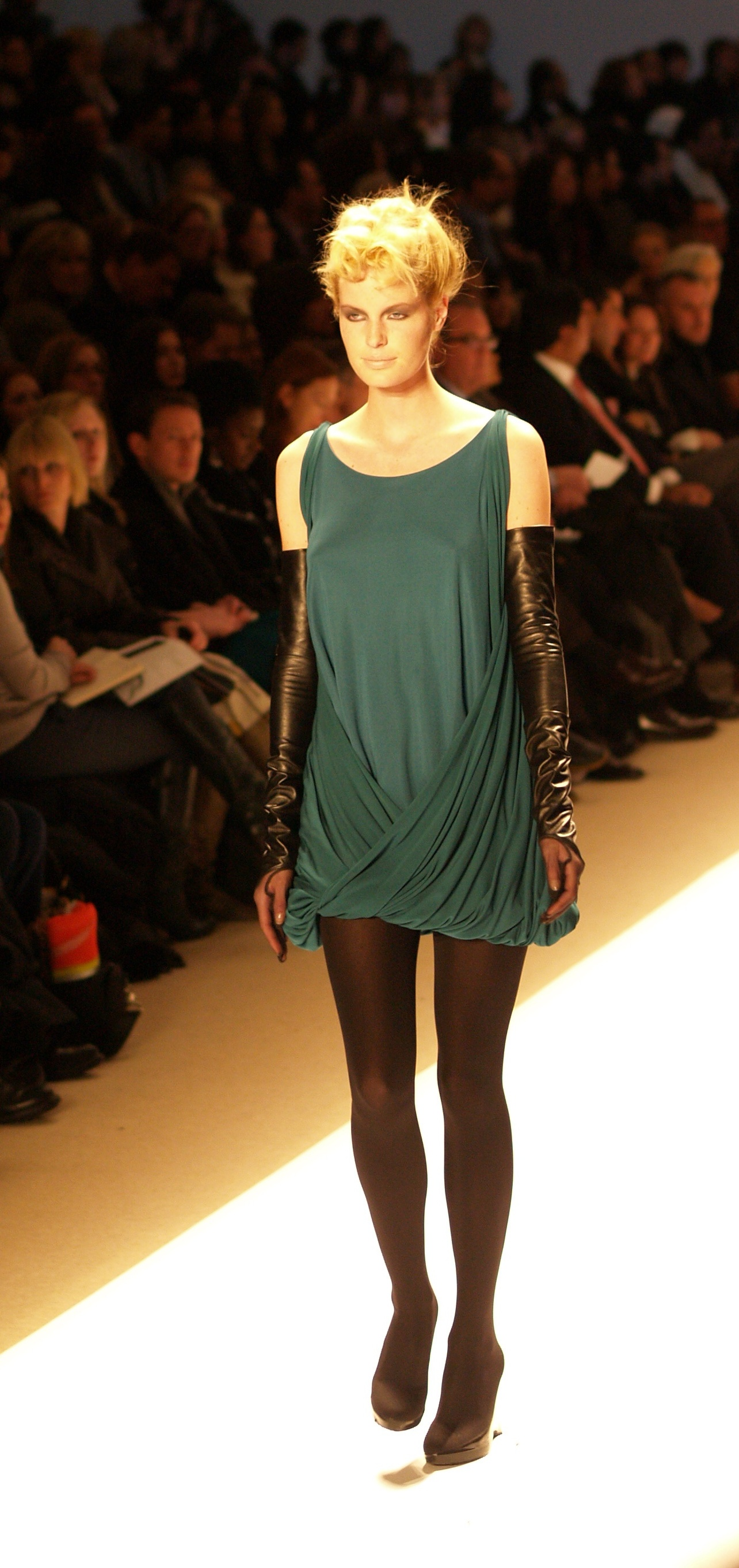
Doo-Ri runway presentation during New York Fashion Week (Fall 2007)

Doo-Ri Chung (Korean: 정두리; born 1973) is an American fashion designer.

== Training and career ==
Chung graduated from The New School university's Parsons division with a Bachelor of Fine Arts in Fashion in 1995. After receiving her degree, Chung worked for Geoffrey Beene for six years, rising to the position of head designer.

In 2001, Chung started her own firm in the basement of her parents' dry cleaning business. The firm remained there for the next four years. Chung is best known for her jersey dresses, which have a unique drape. Chung has stated that she has no plans to move away from creating such dresses, as she now has a steady clientele. She is inspired by Ann Demeulemeester, Martha Graham and Joseph Beuys. Chung planned to introduce a shoe line in fall 2008.

In October 2011, at a state dinner honoring South Korean President Lee Myung-bak and his wife, Kim Yoon-ok, First Lady Michelle Obama wore an asymmetrical purple dress designed by Chung. The dress was a classic Chung creation, featuring draped jersey fabric with a chiffon belt embellished with multicolored crystals. It was described as "Ultra-violet, ultra-cool"

In June 2012, Chung announced she was leaving Doo.Ri, her eponymous label. In January 2013, she became creative director of the contemporary clothing line Vince in Los Angeles, a position she left in October 2013.

== Awards ==
In 2004, Chung was a finalist for the Vogue/Council of Fashion Designers of America Fashion Fund Award.

Chung won the Swarovski's Perry Ellis Award for emerging talent in womenswear from the Council of Fashion Designers of America in June 2006. Chung's award was based on her 2005 Spring and Fall collections. Also in 2006, Chung won the Council of Fashion Designers of America/Vogue Fashion Fund Award. This $200,000 prize also came with a Lexus and a Montblanc watch.

== Personal life ==
In 2006, Chung married Jeff Green. She and her husband made their own wedding rings. When not working, Chung enjoys travel, cooking, films, and reading the newspaper. Chung's favorite destinations are Turks and Caicos and Anguilla.

== Filmography ==
- Seamless, 2005
