= Tourist attractions in Kalahandi district =

Bhawanipatna is classified as one of the major tourist destinations by the tourism Department of Government of Odisha. All the tourist attraction in Kalahandi region comes under Bhawanipatna jurisdiction. Though tourist potential of Kalahandi has not been fully exploited, the land is rich in terms of waterfalls, forest and wild life, natural scenery, tribal life, mountains, agriculture field, historical sites and handicrafts. The best time to visit Kalahandi region is from October to March. April–June is hard Summer and temperatures may reach 45 degree C and June to August is the Monsoon Season. While it occasionally rains in September, the Nuakhai festival is help in September and Dassara is held at the end of September or early October. The celebration of Chaitra occurs in February/March.

== Introduction ==
=== History ===
The history of Kalahandi goes back to the primitive period where a well-civilized, urbanized and cultured people inhabited on this land mass around 2000 years ago. The world's largest celt of Stone Age and the largest cemetery of the megalithic age have been discovered in Kalahandi – this shows the region had cradle of civilization since the pre-historic era. Asurgarh near Narla in Kalahandi was one of the oldest metropolises in Odisha whereas the other one was Sisupalgarh near Bhubaneswar. Some other historical forts in the region includes Budhigarh (ancient period), Amthagarh (ancient period), Belkhandi (ancient to medieval period) and Dadpur-Jajjaldeypur (medieval period). In ancient history this kingdom was serving as salt route to link between ancient Kalinga and South Kosala. This land was unconquered by the great Ashoka, who fought the great Kalinga War, as per Ashokan record. In medieval period the region had played a prominent role to link South India, Eastern India and Central India region and witnessed the battle ground for Somavamsi, Chola, Kalachuris of Kalyani and Eastern Ganga dynasty. Kalahandi region was the main route for Chola to attack Subarnapur of South Kosal.

The history of Kalahandi is rich in terms of contribution towards the Indian culture and temple architecture. Temple of Goddess Stambeswari at Asurgarh, built during 500 AD, is a perfect example where the first brick Temple in Eastern India was built. Sanskritization in Odisha was first started from Kalahandi, Koraput region, ancient Mahakantara region. Earliest flat-roofed stone temple of Odisha was built at Mohangiri in Kalahandi during 600 AD. Temple architecture achieved perfection at Belkhandi in Kalahandi and then traversed to Ekamra, present Bhubaneswar, along with the political expansion of the Somavamsis during the 1000–1100 AD.

The distribution and occurrence of precious and semi-precious gemstones and other commercial commodities of Kalahandi region have found place in accounts of Panini (5th century BC), Kautilya (3rd century BC), Ptolemy (2nd century AD), Wuang Chuang (7th century AD) and Travenier (19th century). Present name Kalahandi finds mention for the first time in the Junagarh Dadhivaman temple inscription issued from Kalahandinagara by Maharaja Jugasai Dev in A. D. 1718... The region was known as various names in different period of time such as Kantara, Mahakantara, Titilaka Janapada, Atavi Land, Chakrakota Mandala, Kamala Mandala and Karonda Mandal. It was also part of South Kosal and Trikalinga. It was a feudatory under Eastern Ganga dynasty, Gadajat under Maratha and Princely State under British rule in India. After independence of India, in 1948, Kalahandi joined Indian Union and became a part of Odisha state. However, in post independence period the name Kalahandi got associated with backwardness despite its rich history, culture, art, craft and agriculture & forest resources.

=== Topography and culture ===
The topography of Kalahandi consists of plain land, hills & mountains. Kalahandi is surrounded by hills with its border with other districts in the South and East, whereas large part of its land in North and West is primarily agricultural and plain land. Over one third of tKalahandi is covered with dense jungle forest and one third of the population is tribal. Thus, Kalahandi is a rich land in terms of culture and festivals. Since it is a melting point of South Odisha and Western Odisha with a substantial tribal population, those living in hills as well as plain land, their different culture, tradition, languages and belief along with mainstream Hindu culture have made Kalahandi region rich with culture and festivals. In pre-independence period Kalahandi was largely inspired to Saivaism, Vaishanivism and Shakti puja. Shakti Puja is largely accepted among tribal, perhaps due to which Kalahandi was well known for celebrating Shati Puja. However, affect induction of Kalahandi as part of Odisha state, dominance of coastal Odisha culture in the state is increasingly influencing the local culture. Celebration of Rathajatra and construction of Jaggannath temple in Kalahandi has been increasingly realized unlike in old days of Radha Krishna temple.

=== Transportation and hospitality ===
For transportation to Kalahandi, the nearest airport is located in Raipur (200–250 km) having daily flights to majority of the cities in India. Kalahandi can be reached from Raipur via Nuapada or Dharamgarh. Vishakhapatnam airport is located in 300 km and Bhubaneswar airport in 450 km. Kesinga is the gateway of Kalahandi for rail connectivity. It is directly linked with most of the major cities in India, such as Delhi, Chennai, Kolkata, Bangalore, Hyderabad, Ranchi, Bhubaneswar, Visakhapatnam, Raipur, Nagpur, and Ahmedabad, by rail. The train connection to Bhawanipatna and Junagarh is getting operational via Lanjigarh road. National Highway 26 and 27 pass through Kalahandi. Luxury night buses are available to Bhubaneswar, Katak, Raipur, Visakhapatnam, Sambalpur and Rourkela from Bhawanipatna, Dharamgarh, Jaipatna, Junagarh, Kesinga, Koksara, etc. Accommodation and hotels are available in Bhawanipatna, Dharamgarh, Junagarh and Kesinga.

== Major destinations ==
Bhawanipatna, Dharamgarh, Golamunda, Jaipatna, Junagarh, Karlamunda, Kalampur, Kesinga, Koksara, Lanjigarh, Madanpur Rampur, Narla, and Thuamul Rampur

== Water features ==
Lake

Indravati Lake in Mukhiguda, Jaipatna

Ashasagar, Bhawanipatna

Chhoriagad, Dharamgarh

Waterfall

Phurlijharan, Bhawanipatna

Dokarichanchara, Dharamgarh

Rabanddarah, Bhawanipatna

Urladani, Madanpur Rampur

Karaka, Ampani

Dumri Jhulla, Karlapat

Kamla Jharan, Karlapat

Kuang, Karlapat

Ghusurigudi, Karlapat

Ghumar, Thuamul Rampur

Sindher, Thuamul Rampur

Mardiguda, Thuamul Rampur: Origin of Indravati river under the Mango tree

Dhoben Chanchra, Sagada, Bhawanipatna

Khandual, Karlapat

== Wild life ==
Sanctuary

Karlapat

Ampani (sometime referred as Ambapani in Oriya)

Scenic Spot

Thuamul Rampur

Perumanji

Ampani

Jakam

Dokarichanchara

Chora Dangar or Chura Pahad

Karlapat

== Monuments ==
Amthaguda

An ancient fort

Asurgarh

An ancient fort, a civilisation about 2000 years old, it is located in Narla and 30 km from Bhawanipatna

Behera

Danteswari Temple

Belkhandi

12th century monuments

Bhawanipatna

Old city, centuries old Manikeswari Temple, Royal Palace

Bhimkhoj

Shiva Temple and Foot Print of Bhima

Budhigarh

Ancient fort

Dadpur-Jajjaldeypur

Medieval fort

Dharamgarh

Old Radhakrushna Temple, Paradeswar Temple

Gudahandi

Ancient caves and painting

Junagarh

An old town, Century old temples, Lankeswari Temple, Dadhibamana Temple, Kanakdurga Temple, Fort Kusurla and Sapagarand

Religious Centers

Mohangiri

Oldest temple in Odisha, 6th century Shiva Temple

Mukhiguda

Power plant

Talguda fort

Historical site

Teresinga

Historical site

Urlukupgarh

Ancient fort

== Festivals ==
Chhatar Jatra in Bhawanipatna

Khandabasa in Junagarh

Kalahandi Utsav

Chaitra or Ghanta Jatra in Dharamgarh

Nuakhai

Pora Uansh (or Pura Uansha)

Tokimara Jatra

Budharaja Jatra in Ampani

Pat Jatra, Luhabahal in Jaipatna

Nagabom (Shivaratri) in Dharamgarh

Shivaratri in Mohangiri, M.Rampur

Talgud Jatra at Talgud(Mukhiguda)

== Arts and Crafts ==
Wood Craft in Khairpadar

Bamboo Craft in Narla

Stone Work in Ampani

Handicraft in Habaspur

Handicraft in Chichiguda

== Tribal culture ==
Niyamgiri

Lanjigarh

The village has some fortifications with a large moat around. It contains the temples of Gopinath and a female Deity called "Dokari" greatly revered in the area. The local Jhami Yatra or Jhamu Yatra in the month of Chaitra (March–April) is an occasion when thousands of people gathered and witness the walking on burning charcoal by a number of devotees,

Nakarundi

Thuamul Rampur
