= Festivals of Kalahandi =

Festivals of Kalahandi are rich in nature as the place is a melting point of South Odisha and Western Odisha. Kalahandi, a district of Odisha, shelters a substantial tribal population residing both in hills and plain land. It is a place where people of different cultures, traditions, languages and beliefs live together.

== Culture ==
Kalahandi is a rich land in terms of culture and festivals. Since it is a melting point of South Odisha and Western Odisha with a substantial tribal population, those living in hills as well as plain land, their different culture, tradition, languages and belief along with mainstream Hindu culture have made Kalahandi region rich with culture and festivals. The mixture of Aryan and tribal culture makes Kalahandi region rich in its culture and festivals. In pre-independence period Kalahandi was largely inspired to Saivaism, Vaishanivism and Shakti puja. Shakti Puja is largely accepted among tribal, perhaps due to which Kalahandi was well known for celebrating Shakti Puja. However, affect induction of Kalahandi as part of Odisha state, dominance of coastal Odisha culture in the state is increasingly influencing the local culture. Celebration of Rathajatra and construction of Jaggannath temple in Kalahandi has been increasingly realized unlike in old days of Radha Krishna temple.

== Festivals ==
=== Popular Hindu festivals ===
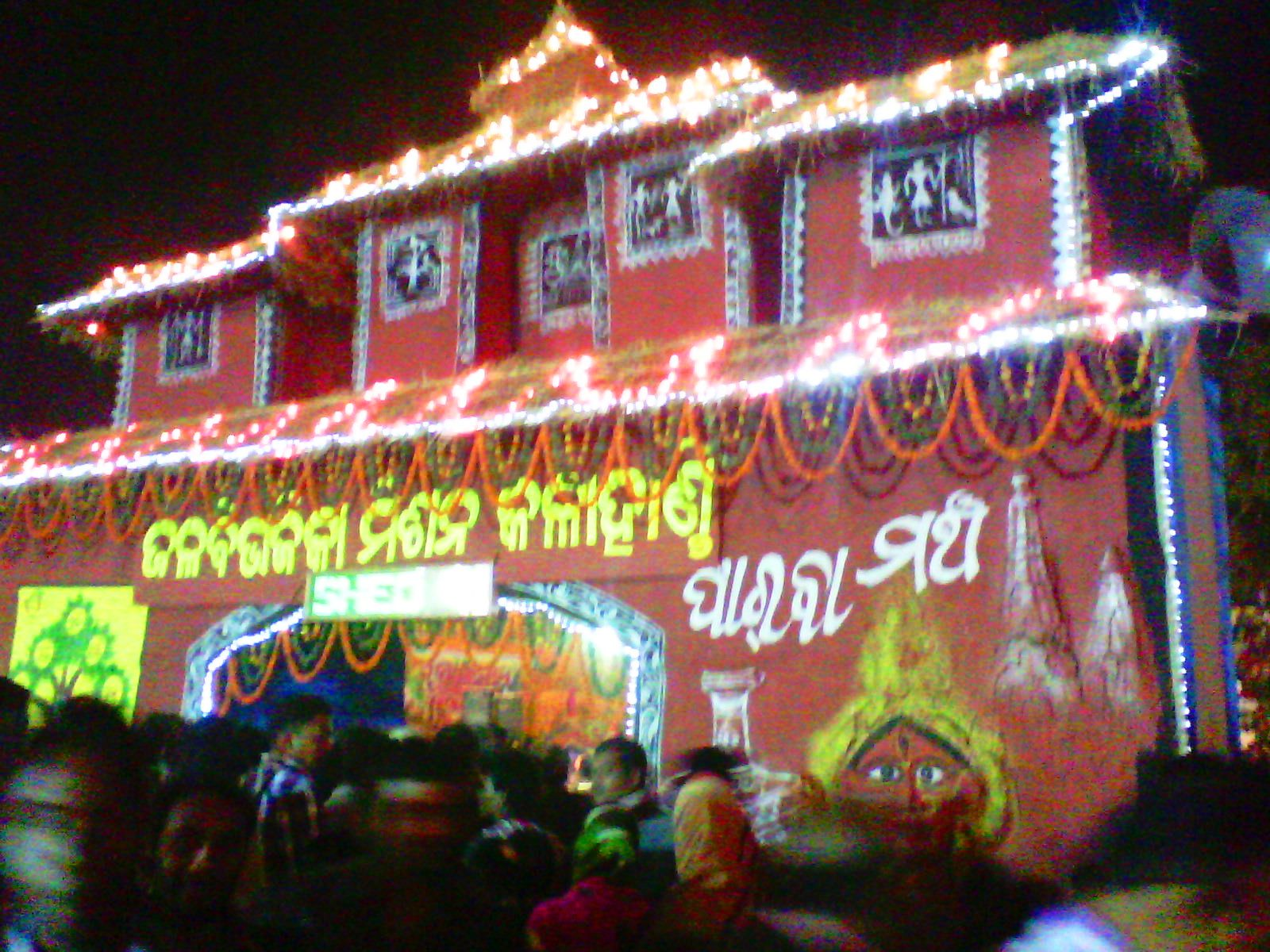
Durga Puja in Naktiguda, Kalahandi

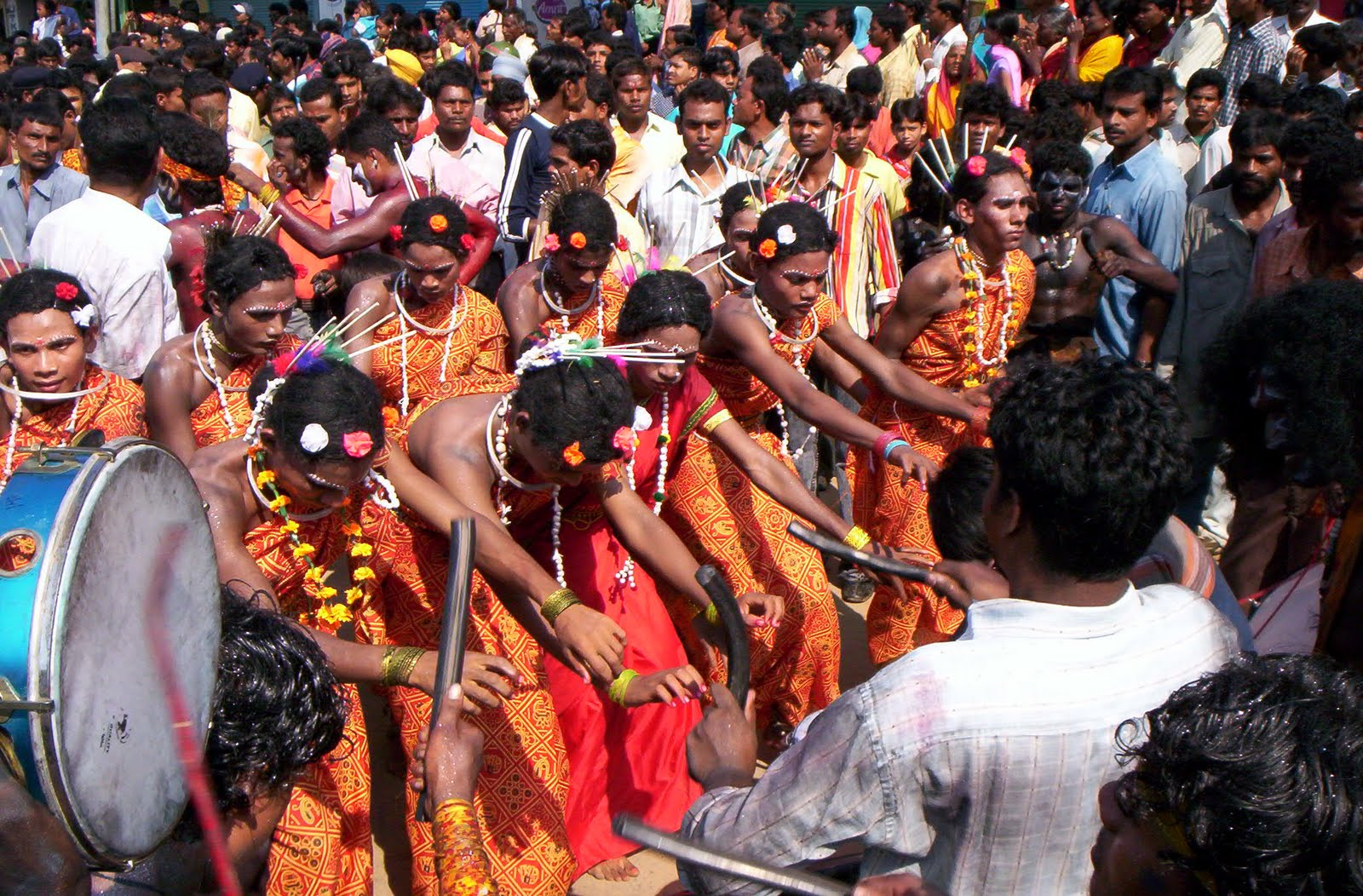
Chhatra Jatra in Bhawanipatna

- Dasra (Dasara): Dasara or Durga Puja is celebrated among Hindu all over India, but it is very popular in Eastern part of India including West Bengal, Odisha, Assam etc. However, goddess Durga is known as Shakti (Energy) and most of the goddess based on tribal and Shakti is inspired from goddess Durga. The major goddess of Kalahandi including Mnikeswari, Lankeswari, Denteswari, Khameswari, Bhandargharen etc. are seen as a reflection of goddess Durga and most of the major festivals like Chhatar Jatra, Kkandabasha, Budharaja Jatra, etc. are celebrated during Dusra. Dusra is significant in all the Shakti Pitha in Kalahandi and is one of the popular festival in the region.
- Diel or Deepawali: Also popularly known as Diwali is celebrated in Kalahandi. But this is getting popular due to immigrant business community mainly from Marwadi community, however, slowly it has entered the local stream.
- Rathajatra: The festival of Rathjatra. Chariot of Jagannath from Jagannath temple procession is being observed by everyone in not only Odisha but the whole world.
- Kartik Purnima:This festival is celebrated across kalahandi and one of the major festival of locals, kartik puraan being read through the night and finally at morning the bath clears away the sins.

=== Local special festivals ===
Kalahandi Utsav in Bhawanipatna

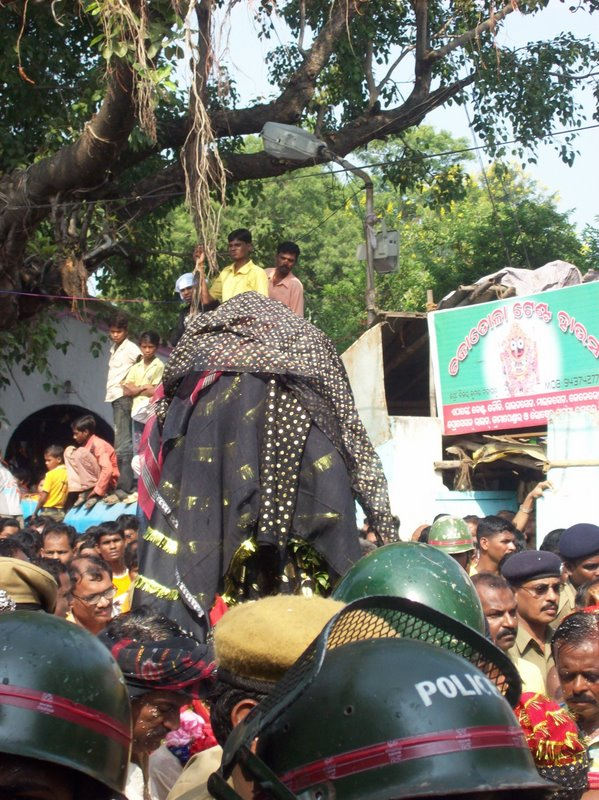
Chhatar of Chhatra Jatra in Bhawanipatna

- Chhatar Jatra: The festival is celebrated in Bhawanipatna.
- Khandabasa: The festival is celebrated in Junagarh in the Lankeswari Temple.
- Nuakhai: Nuakhai is typically a local festival prevalent in Western Odisha including Kalahandi. It is inspired from harvesting of new crops and historically came from tribal. But now everybody irrespective of caste, creed and religion celebrate it. Many tribal converted Christian do celebrate Nuakhai in the region. There are many kinds of Nuakhai according to tribal culture, out of which Dhan (Rice) Nuakhai is most popularly celebrated.
- Amnuan: This is Nuakhai celebration for Am (Mango).
- Kandulnuan: This festival is meant for Nuakhai of Kandul (one kind of lentil)
- Seminuan: This is Nuakhai celebration for Semi, one kind of beans.
- Dumernuan: This Nuakhai resemblances that of a kind of forest fruit known as Dumer.
- Kendunuan: This Nuakhai is meant for Kendu, another kind of forest fruit.
- Kalahandi Utsav: Along with the district administration this festival is celebrated in Bhawanipatna and Dharamgarh.
- Paraja, Permanji: This is a private initiated festivals on tribal culture and life.
- Chaitra
- Bhejinta
- Pojinta
- Sasti Osha
- Janhi Osha
- Beljatra
- Pusparab: It is celebrated throughout Western Odisha and also known as Puspuni and Cherchera.
- Bihanchhina
- Poel Uansh
- Pora Uansh
- Nagbom
- Lakhamara: It is celebrated on the day of Dushera Dasami at Bhawanipatna
