= Karanjkot =

Human settlement in India

Coordinates: 20.055908°N 82.927708°E

Karanjkot is a village in Golamunda block of Kalahandi district, Odisha state, India. It is situated in a place covered with forest and mountains.
