= Mingur =

Coordinates: 19.613°N 82.844°E

Mingur is one of the villages situated in Kalampur block of Kalahandi district in the State of Odisha in India.
