= Junagarh, Kalahandi =

Junagarh
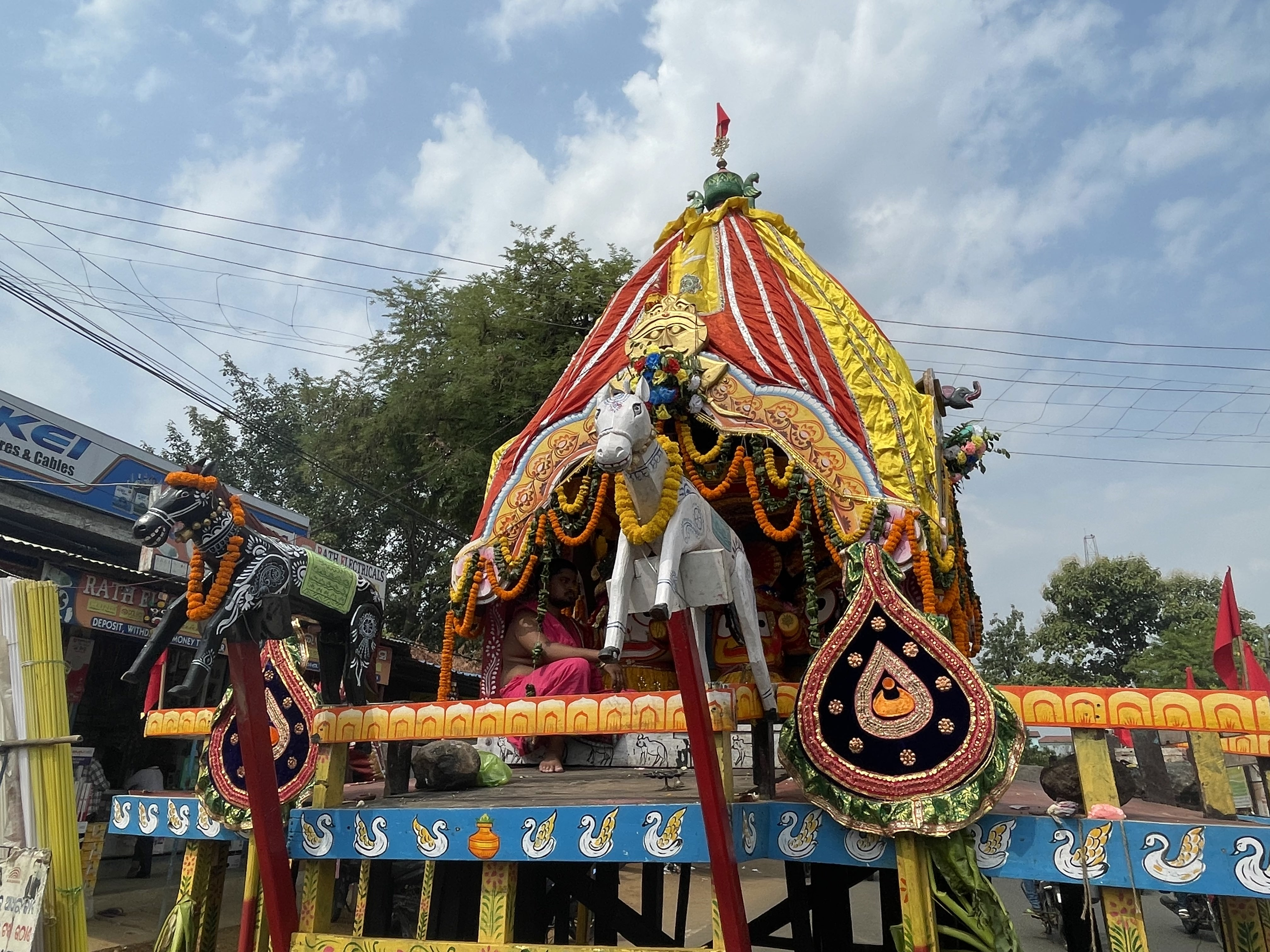
- Ratha Jatra, Junagarh

- Location within Odisha Location within India
- Coordinates: 19°51′43.442″N 82°56′24.297″E
- Country: India
- State: Odisha
- District: Kalahandi
- NAC: 1970

Government
  - Type: Notified Area Council
  - Body: Chairman
  - MLA: Dibya Sankar Mishra
  - MP: Malabika Kesari Deo

Area
  - Total: 15.54 km^{2} (6.00 sq mi)
- Elevation: 216 m (709 ft)

Population (2001)
  - Total: 15,759
  - Density: 1,014/km^{2} (2,626/sq mi)
- Demonym: Junagadia
- Time zone: UTC+5:30 (IST)
- ZIP code(s): 766014
- Vehicle registration: OD-08
- Website: Kalahandi.nic.in

Junagarh is a town and a notified area council in Kalahandi district in the Indian state of Odisha. MLA of Junagarh is Captain Dibya Sankar Mishra. It was the capital of the former state of Kalahandi. Junagarh is 26 km from Bhawanipatna, connecting National Highway 201.This highway recently has been termed as National Highway 26.

Junagarh was a well-built fort and capital of Kalahandi during king rule. The fortified area has a number of temples with Odia inscriptions. This is a place which has sculptural evidence of the sati rite, which was prevalent in medieval India, and was stopped during the British Raj by Lord William Bentinck. The sculptures are identified as sati pillars. Junagarh was famous for its ponds and fruit garden "chha kodi bandha naa kodi tota", means 120 ponds and 180 orchard. Junagarh is also famous for its temples. It is also known as temple town of Kalahandi.

== Demographics ==
Junagarh city is divided into 12 wards. As of 2001 India census, Junagarh had a population of 15,759. Males constitute 51% of the population and females 49%. Junagarh has an average literacy rate of 55%, lower than the national average of 59.5%: male literacy is 66%, and female literacy is 44%. In Junagarh, 14% of the population is under 6 years of age.

== Areas In Junagarh ==
- Talbandh Para
- Aam gachh para
- Babu para
- Bad para
- Bajar para
- Bargachh para
- Bramhin para
- Chamra bandh Para
- Dangaghat para
- Dhoba Para
- Fateh Nagar
- Gantayat Para
- Handa Khal Para
- Hinjli Baheli
- Indra khunti Para
- Laxmisagar Para
- Madhyam Para
- Marwadi Para
- Samia bandh Para
- Pragati Nagar Para
- Kanya Ashram Para
- Durga Nagar Para

== Education ==
Schools

- Shinning Kids World
- Junagarh English school
- Junagarh Government High School
- Block Colony U.G.M.E. School
- Jogeswar U.G.M.E School
- Lankeswari Government Girls High School
- Saraswati Sishu Vidya Mandir
- Government TRW Girls school
- Government TRW Boys school
- Guru Gita Smart School
- El Nissi Mission School
- Sri Aurobindo Integral Education Center
- Odisha Adarsh Vidyalaya

(S.A.I.E.C.)

Colleges

- Priyadarsini Indira mahavidyalaya

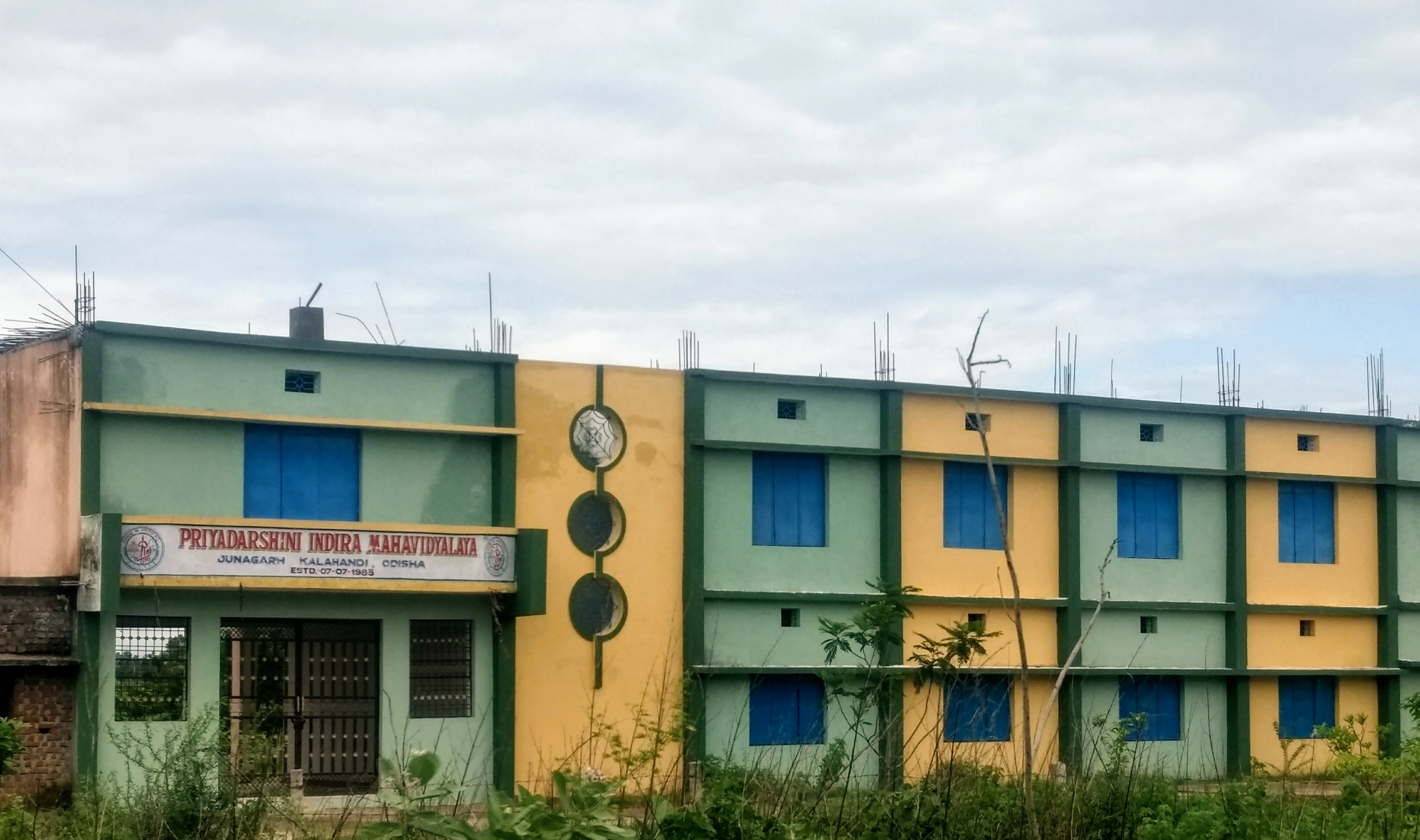
P.I. College

- Chameli Devi women's College
- Sardar Raja Medical College, Jaring
- Lambodara College of Science, Chichaiguda
- Sudhansu Sekhar (Junior) Mohavidyalaya, Karlakot
- Swami Chidananda (Junior) Mahavidyalaya, Karchala
- Chichaiguda (Junior) Mahavidyalaya, Chichaiguda

== Temples ==
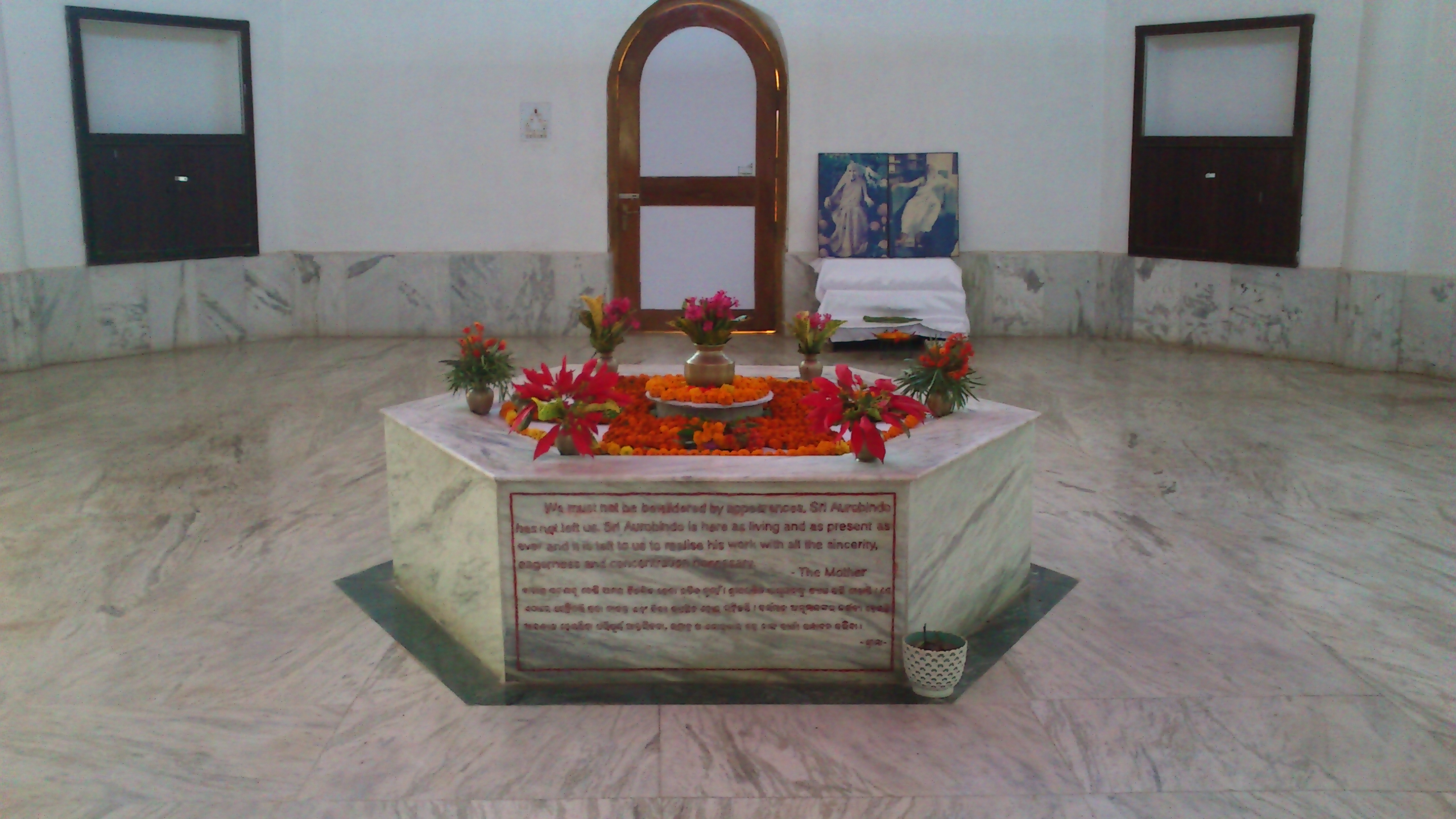
SRI AUROBINDO RELICS CENTER, JUNAGARH

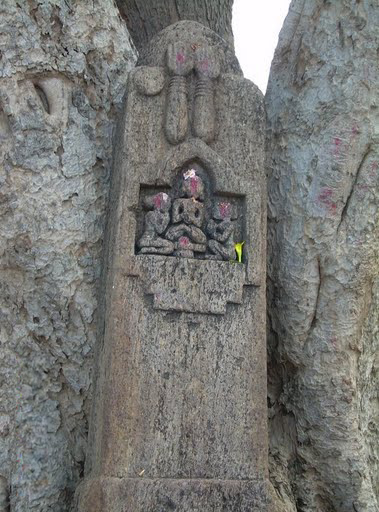
bhairav gudi Junagarh

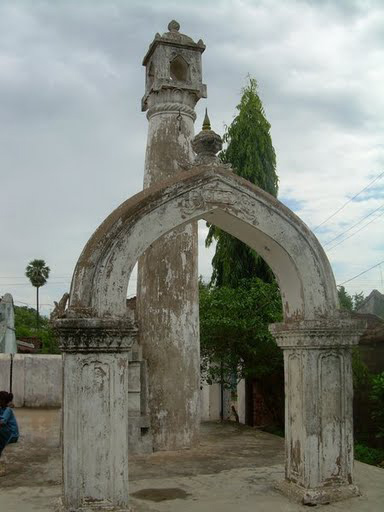
dadhi baman templeJunagarh

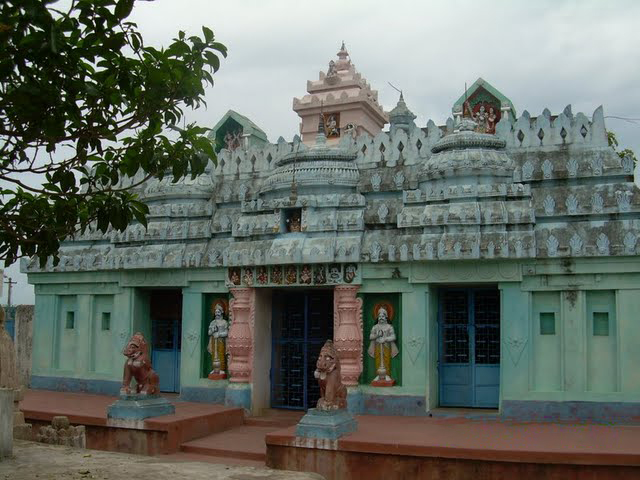
dadhi baman temple Junagarh

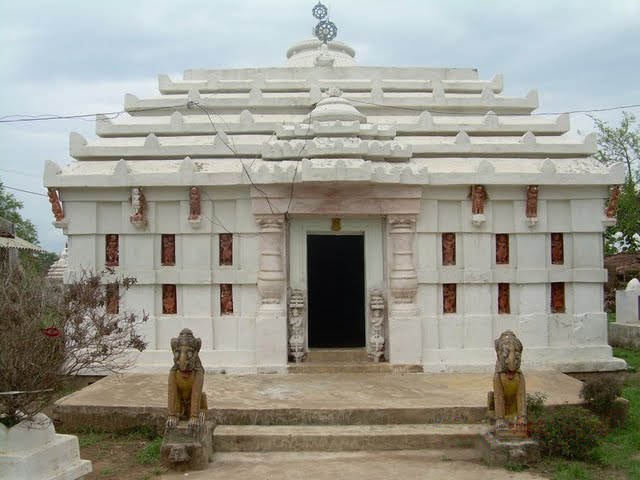
sri ram Temple Junagarh

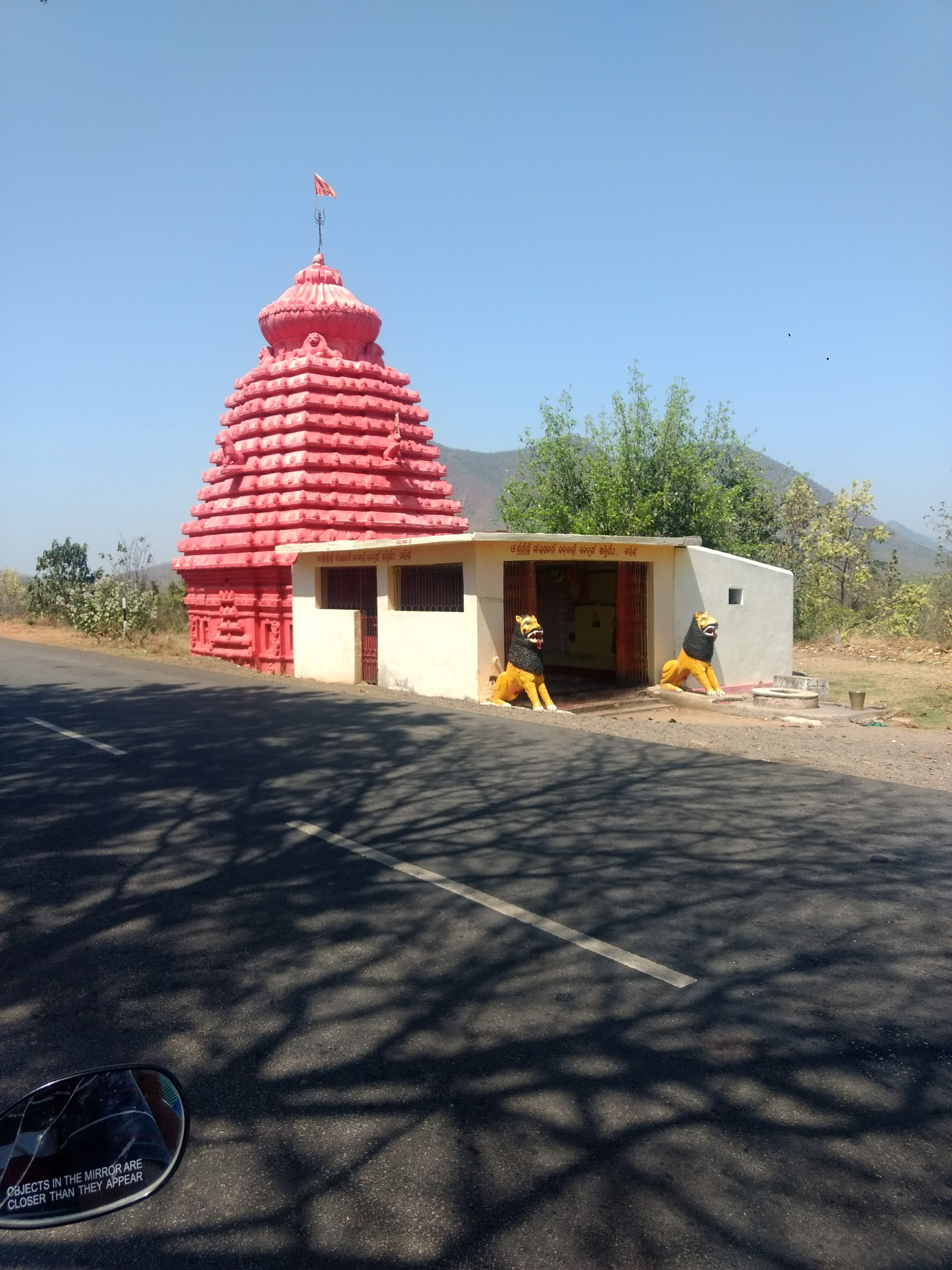
Banjari Temple

== Ganesh Idols at Pandals ==
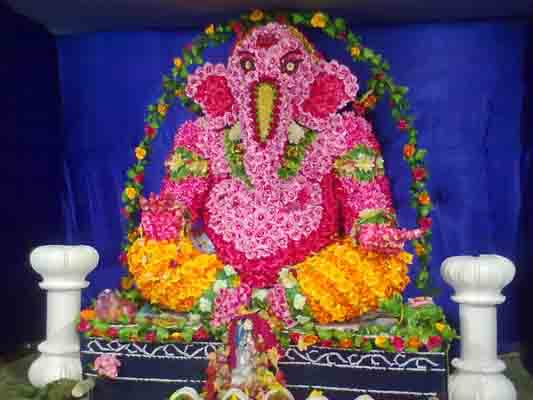
At Bajar Pada in 2011

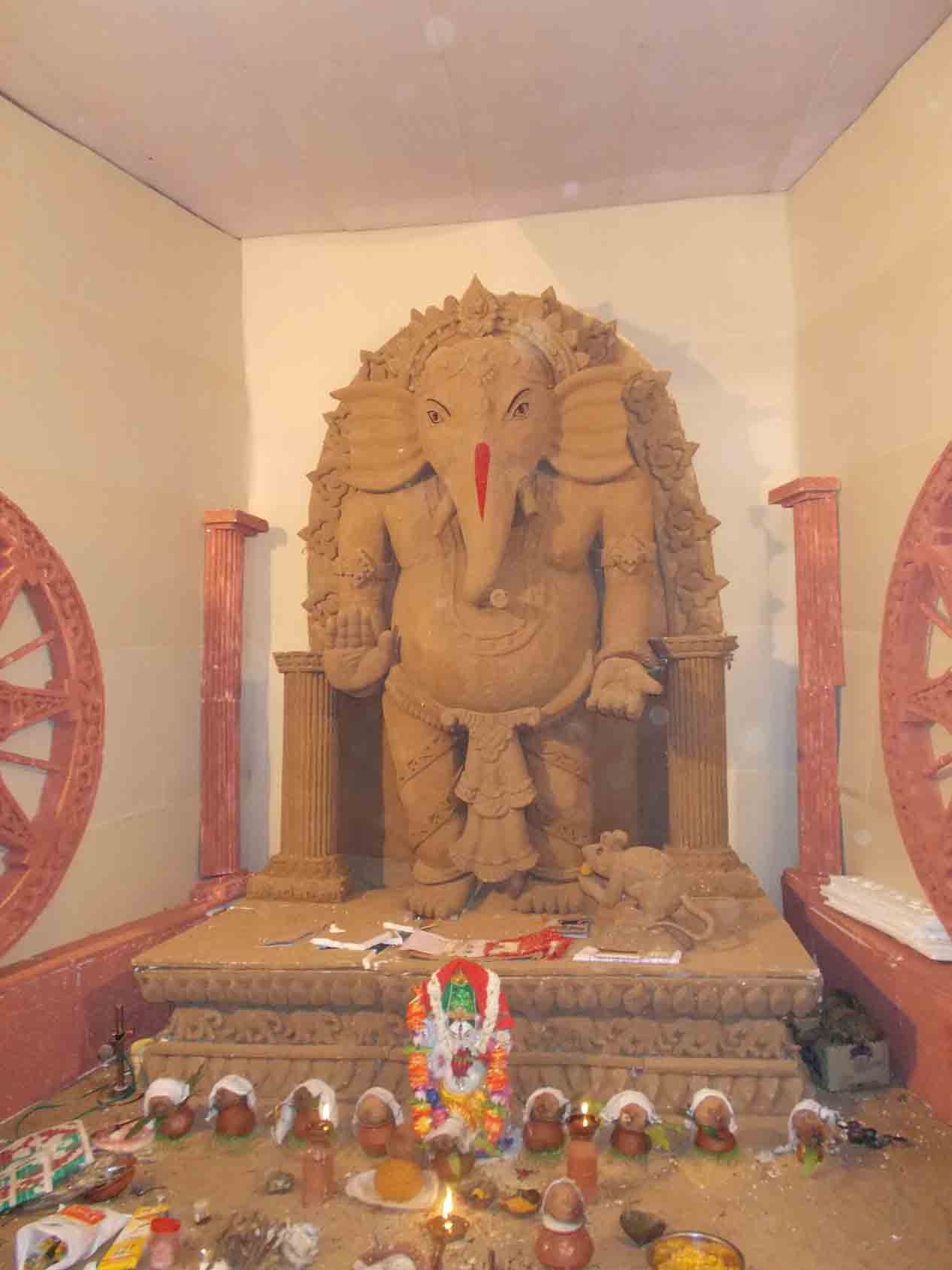
At Bajar Pada in 2012

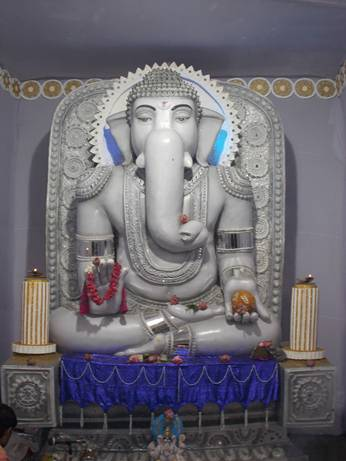
At Bad Pada in 2012

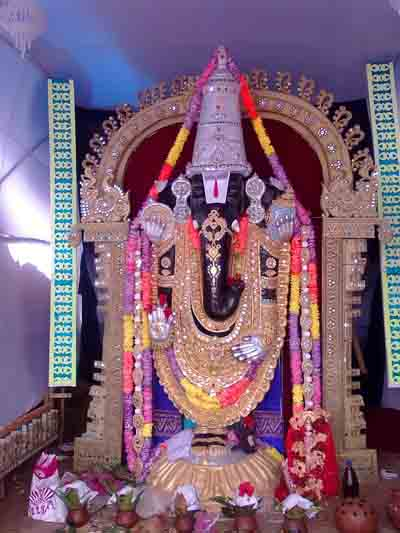
At Bad Pada in 2011
- Lankeswari Temple
- Shiva Temple
- Dadhi baman Temple
- Jagannath Temple
- Trinath Temple
- Sai Temple
- Gayatri Temple
- Kanak Durga Temple
- Poda Mahadev Temple
- Sriram Temple
- Sani dev Temple
- Loknath Temple

== Festivals ==
Maa Lankeshwari is the principal deity of the Naga clan at Junagarh. The deity is still revered by the king and his descendants. The descendants of the king perform puja in the temple of Lankeshwari on the auspicious day of Mulashtami as KHANDABASA

‘Khandabasa’ festival was observed at Goddess Lankeswari temple at Junagarh with the congregation of a large numbers of devotees. After performing the traditional rituals, the swords of Goddess Lankeswari and Bhairav were placed on the two sides of the Goddess Lankeswari altar by a representative of the royal family in standing position over a heap of rice. Goddess Lankeswari is treated as a war Goddess as thus the significance of the practice of ‘Khandabasa’. Tradition has it that during the rule of Chindakanaga, Ganga, Kalachuri and Naga dynasties the traditional sword of Goddess Lankeswari was worshipped to seek her blessings before going to a war.

Durga Puja and gajalaxmi puja are also important festivals. Various pandals are constructed throughout the town.

== Tourist place ==
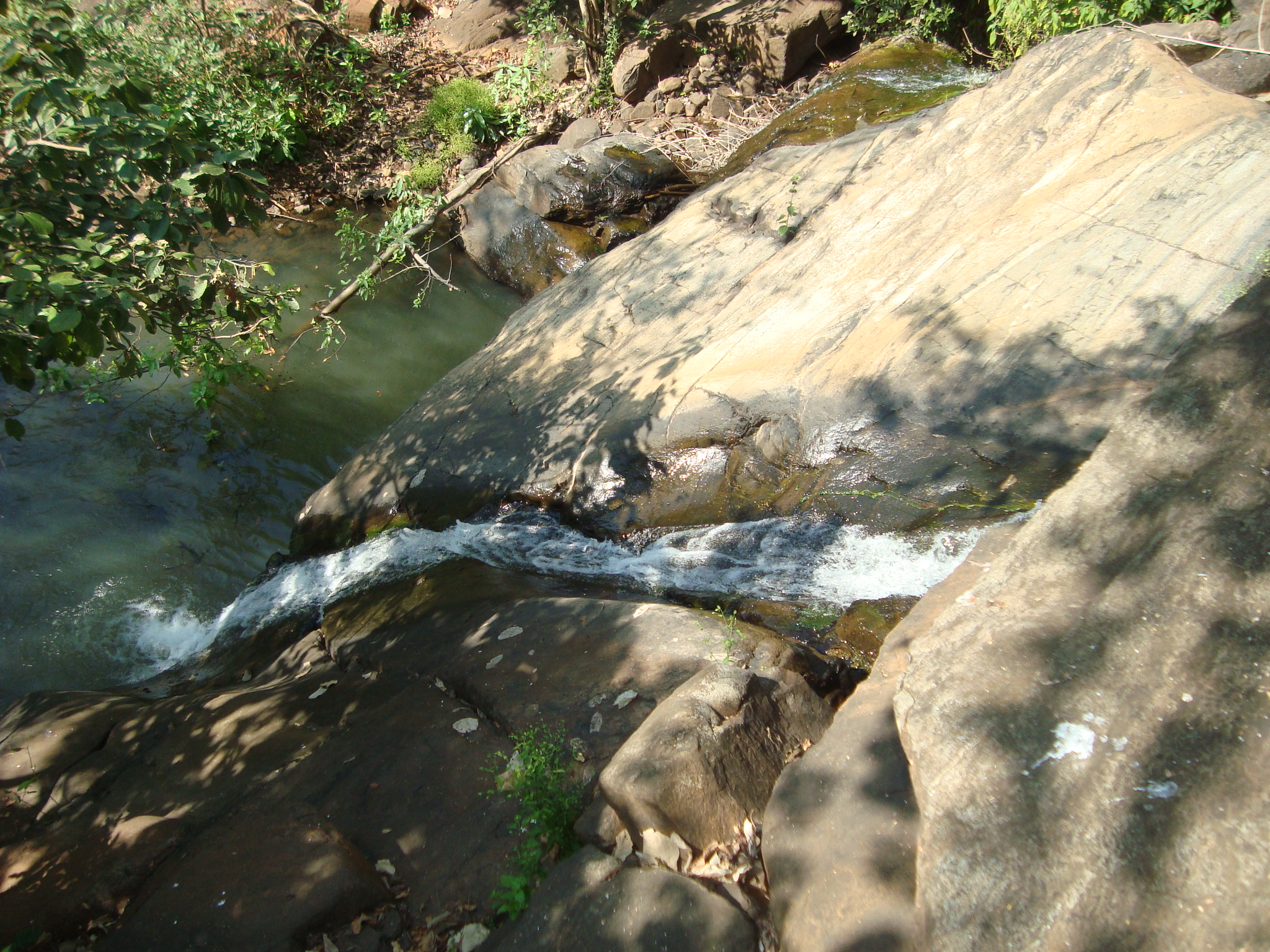
Palmajharan

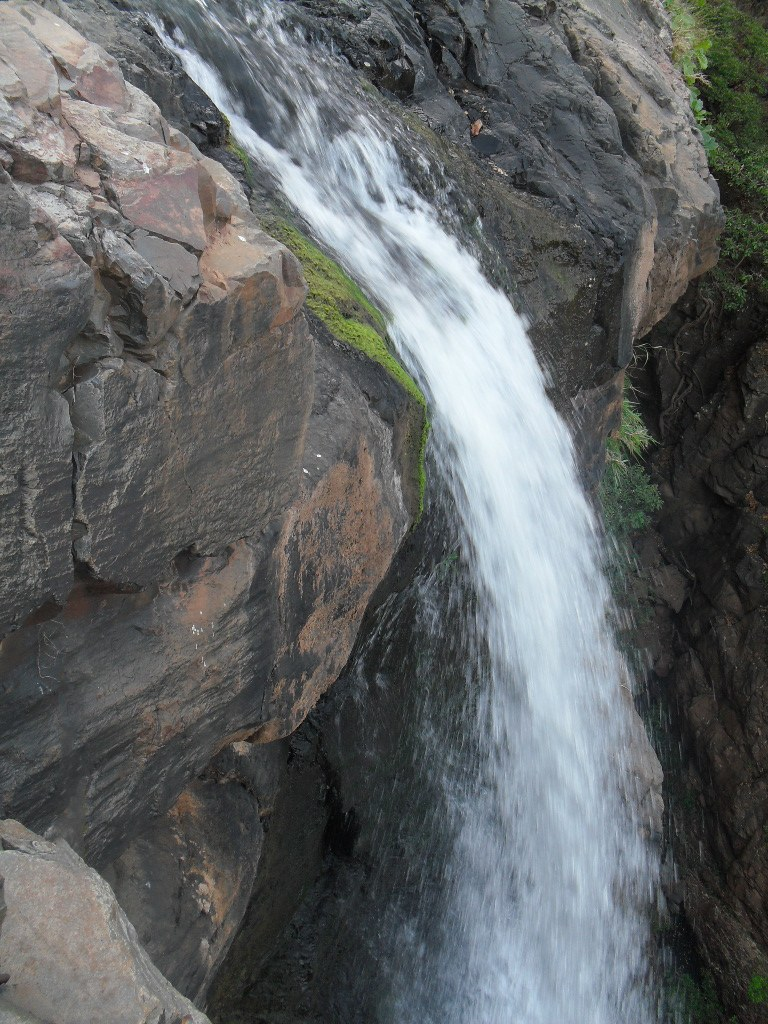
Dokrichanchara

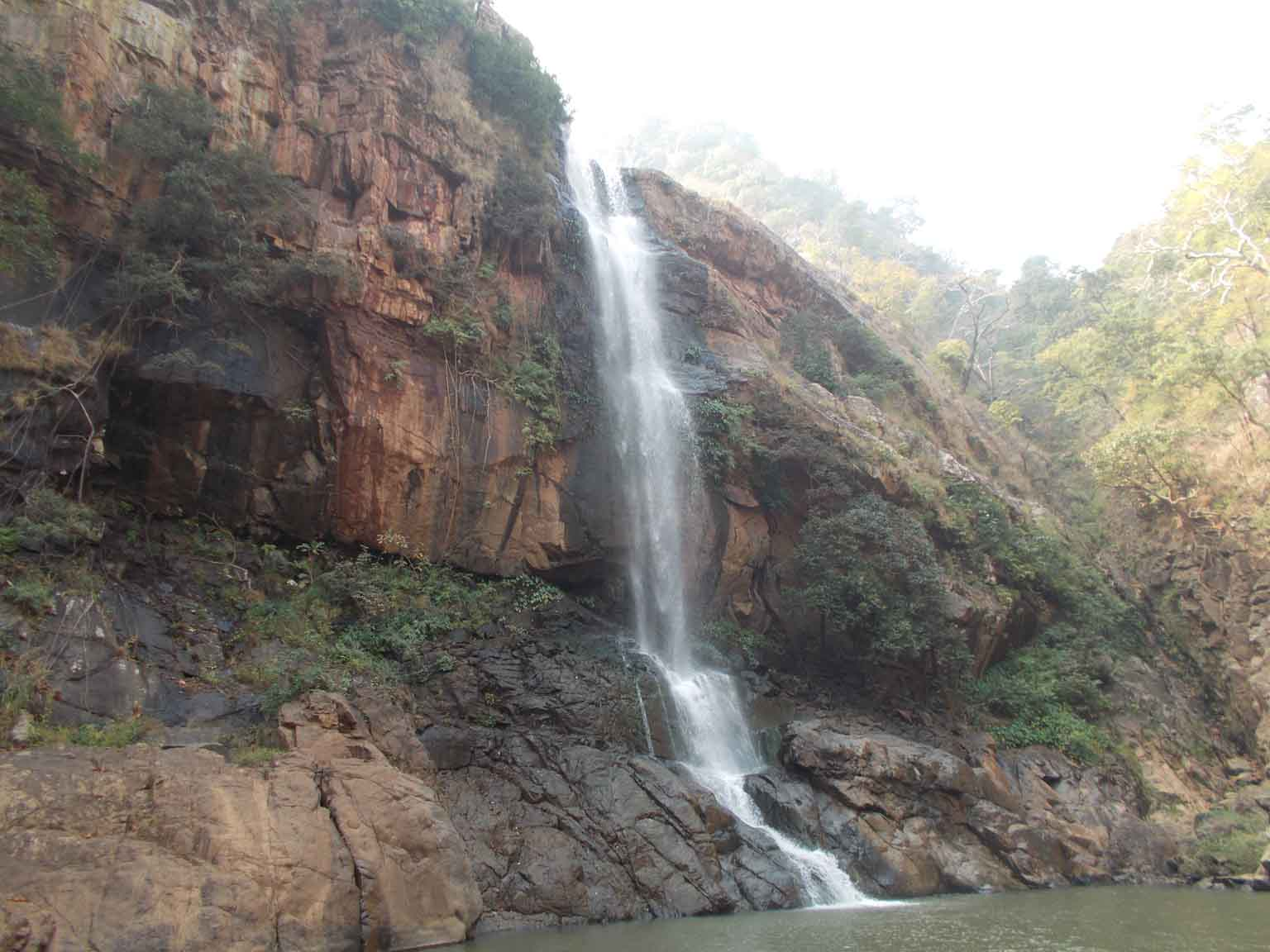
Dokrichanchara
- Chuda pahad
- Bhatra jor(jojna)kupagaon)
- Palma jharan
- Dokarichanchara
- Nilakantheswar Temple, Chichaiguda

== Ponds ==
- Lakshmi Sagar
- Siba Sagar
- Kastura Sagar
- Hira Sagar
- Dhoba Sagar
- Sunari Bandh
- Tal Bandh
- Atra Bandh
- Chamra Bandh
- Samia Bandh
- Rani Bandh

== River ==
- Hatinadi
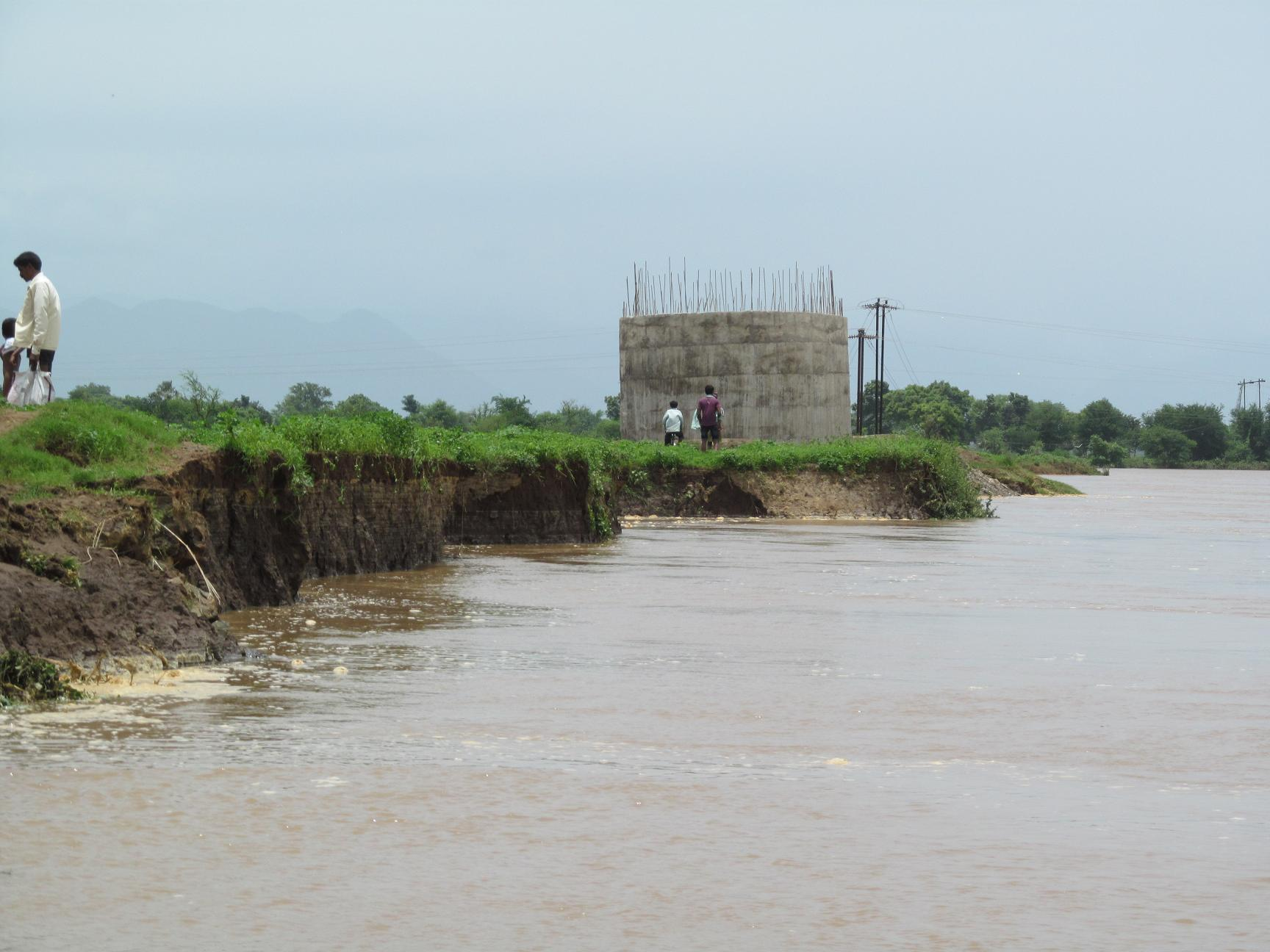
Hati Nadi Bank

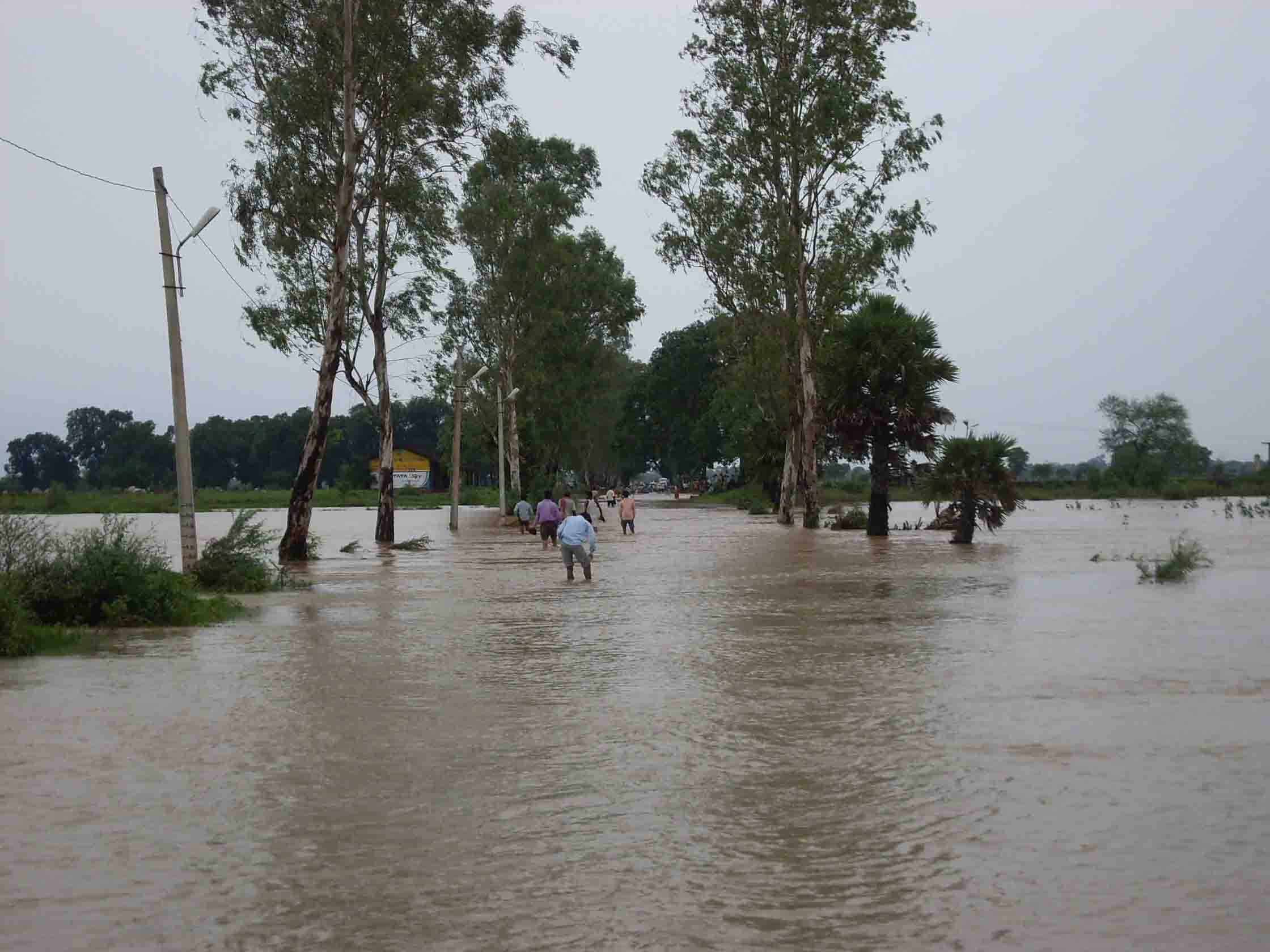
A view of flood in Junagarh
- Sagda
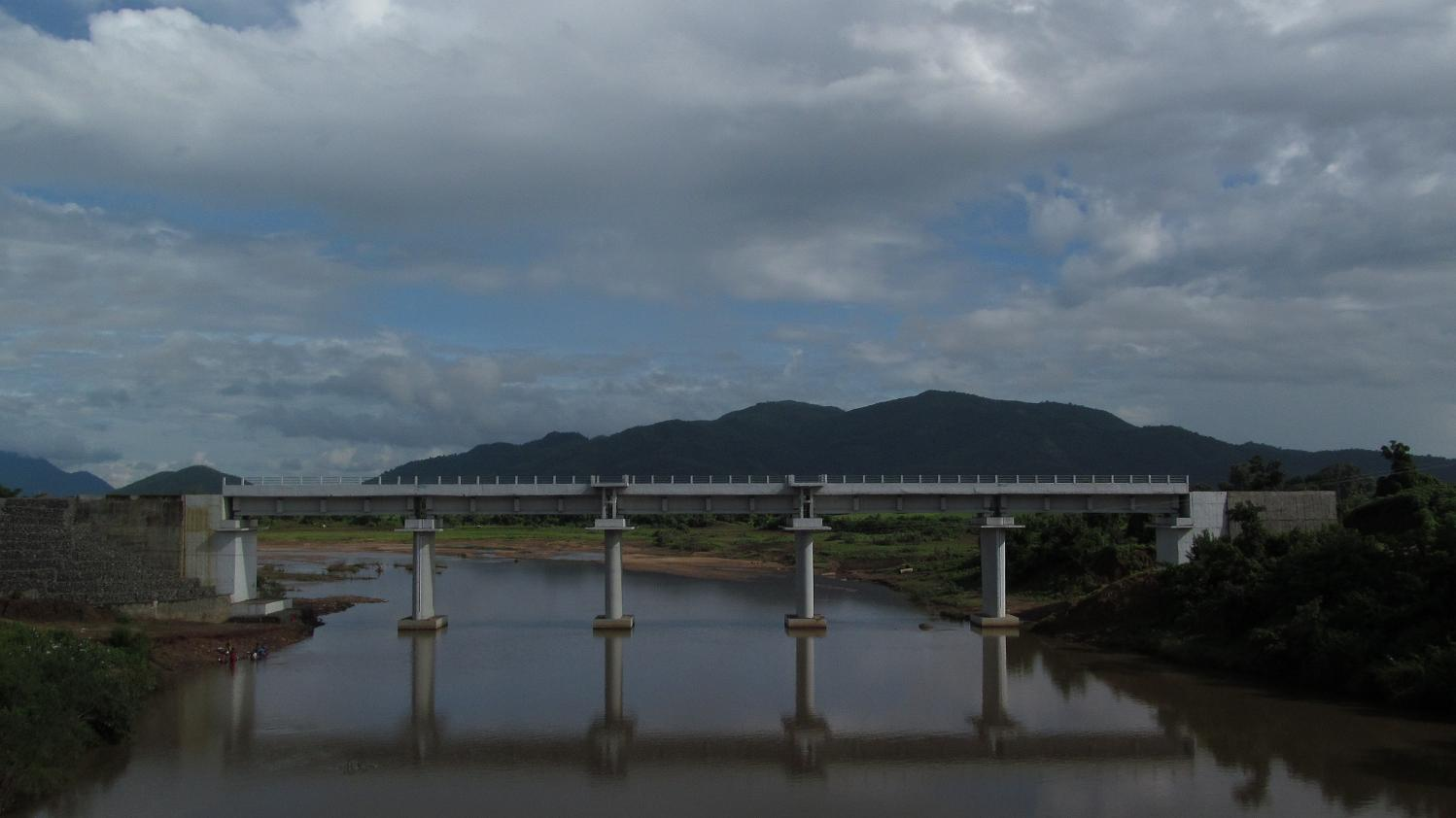
Rail bridge over sagda river

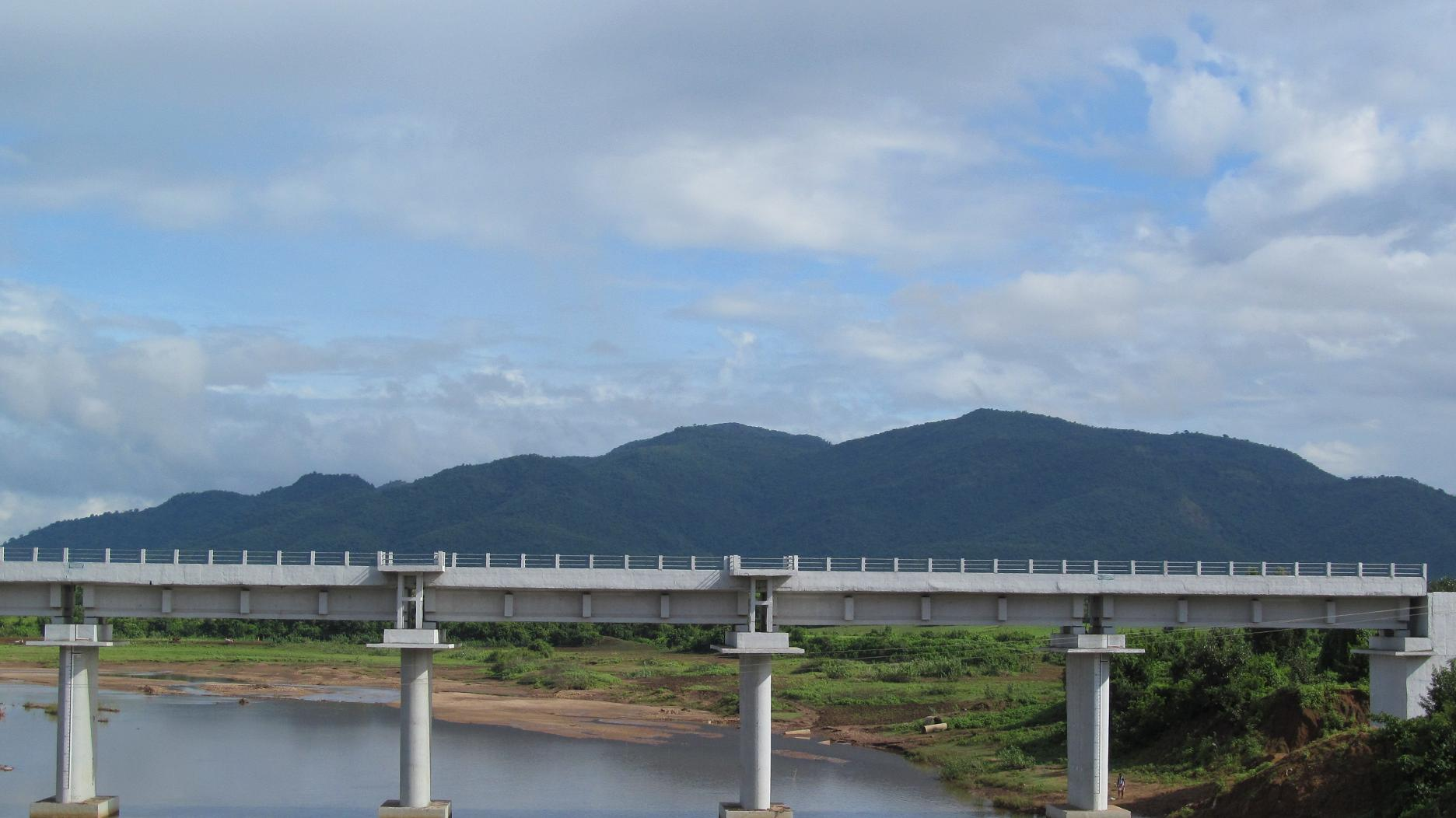
Rail bridge over sagda river

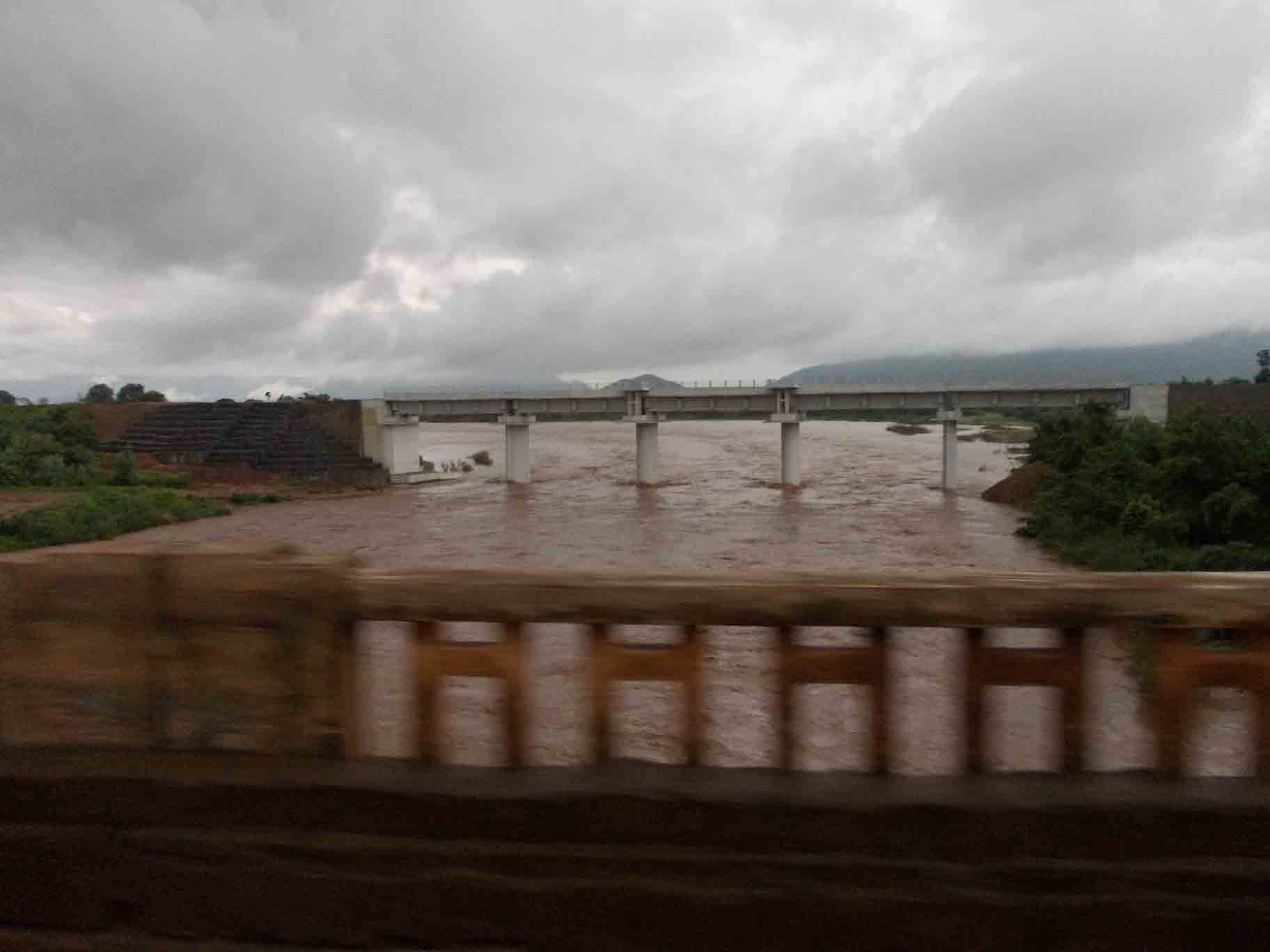
Bridges over Sagda River
- Telnadi

== Hospitals ==
A 50 bedded government hospital is present in the town. A multi specialty clinic named as Bharati health foundation is present near the block office which caters both Medical and Dental facilities. Hospitals Nearby

- Community Health Center, Junagarh (ଗୋଷ୍ଠୀ ସ୍ୱାସ୍ଥ୍ୟ କେନ୍ଦ୍ର, ଜୁନାଗଡ)
- Eye Hospital, Junagarh (ନେତ୍ର ଚିକିତ୍ସାଳୟ, ଜୁନାଗଡ)

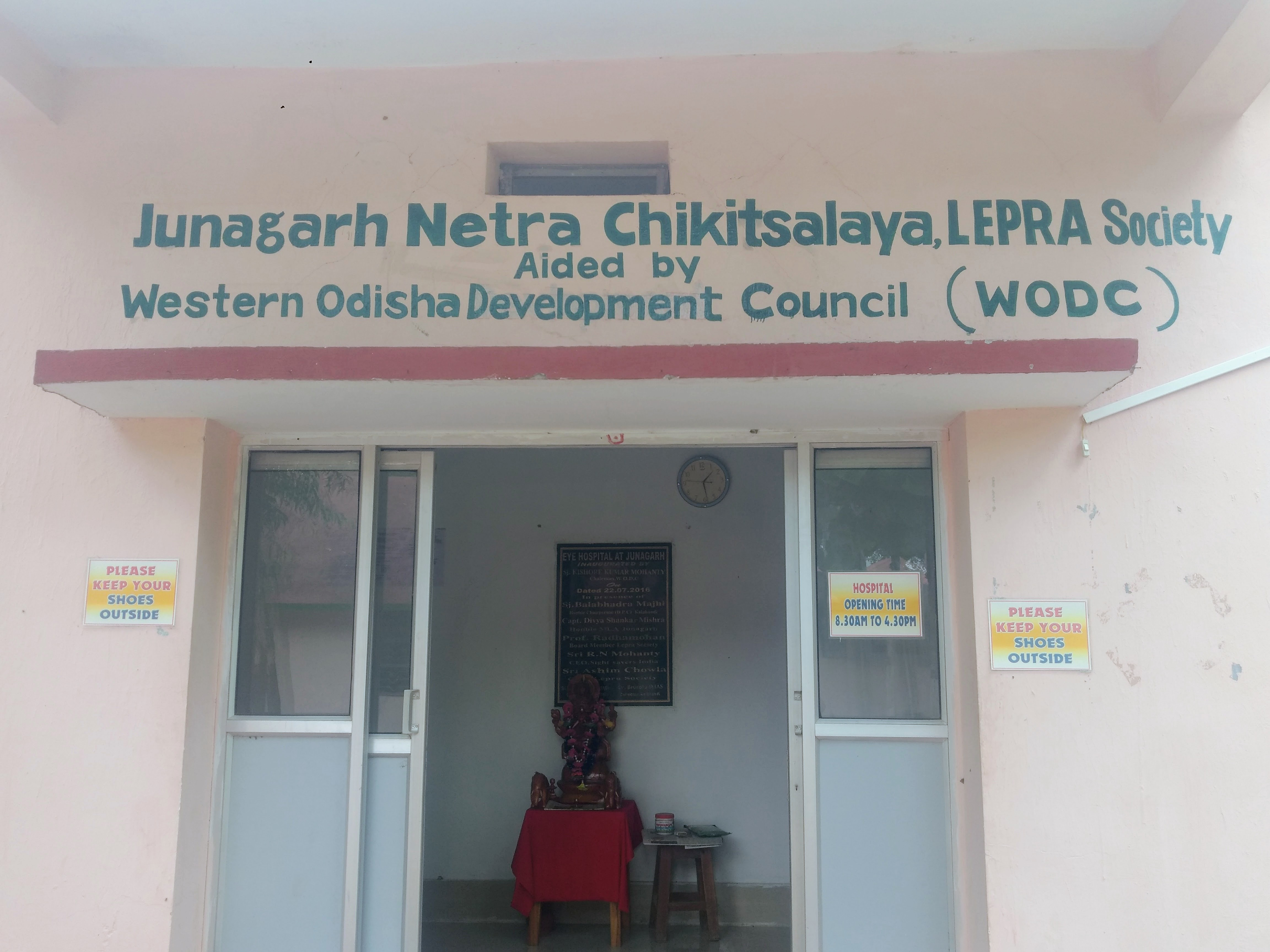
Eye Hospital Junagarh

- Dr UKP Dental & Eye centre(ଦାନ୍ତ ଏବଂ ଚକ୍ଷୁ ଚିକିସ୍ଯାଳୟ)
- Sub-Divisional Headquarters Hospital, Dharamgarh

== Transport ==
A new railway station for Junagarh has been opened for service and was inaugurated on 2 March 2014.

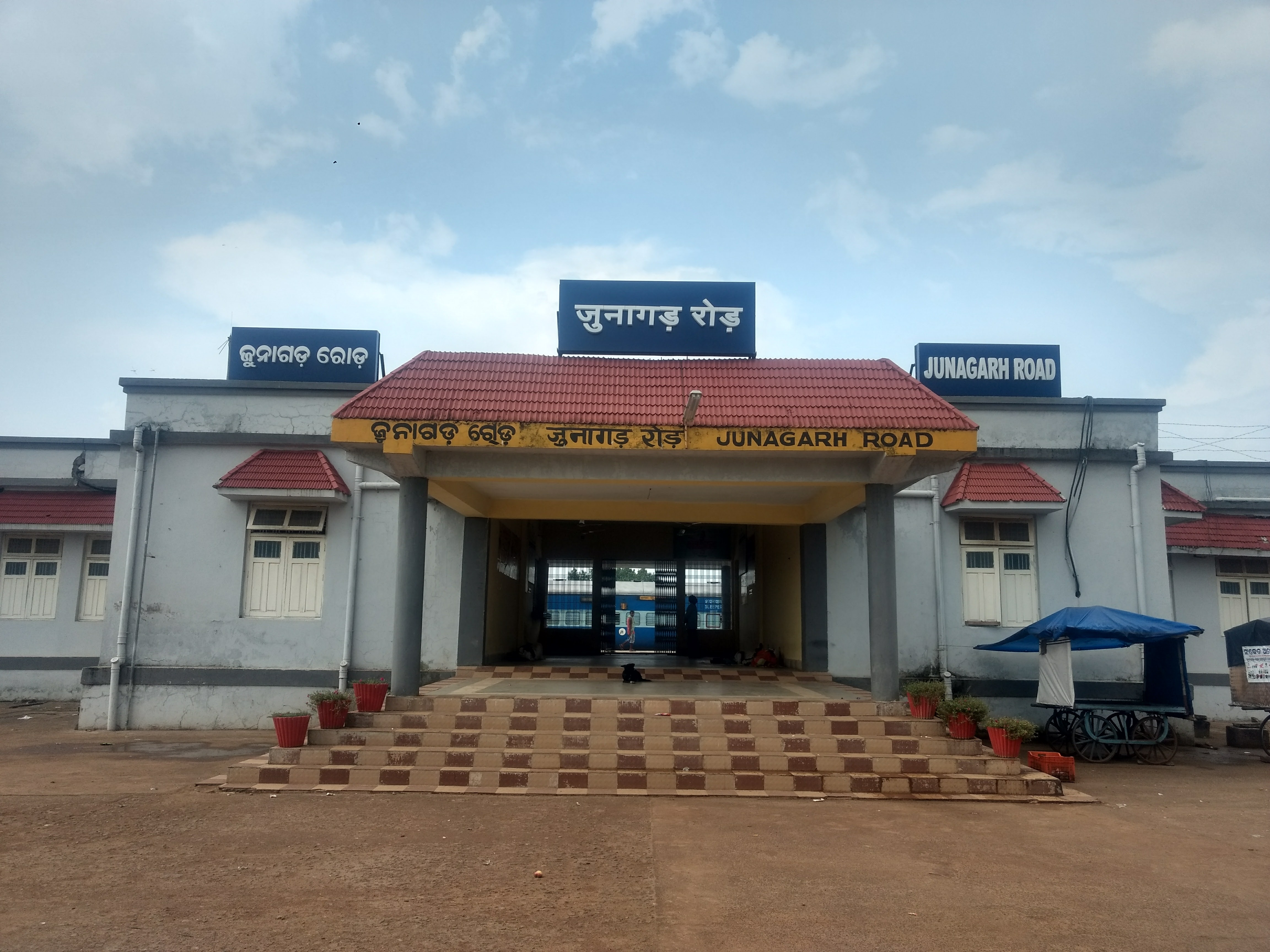
Junagarh Road Railway Station

Junagarh to Raipur 58208/Junagarh Road - Raipur Passenger

Junagarh to Bhubaneswar 18438/Junagarh Road - Bhubaneswar Express

Junagarh to Sambalpur 58304/Junagarh Road - Sambalpur Passenger

== Politics ==
Current MLA from Junagarh Assembly Constituency is Dibya Shankar Mishra of BJD, who won the seat in State elections of 2014. Previous MLAs from this seat include Himansu Sekhar Meher who won this seat in 2004 and also in 2000 as BJP candidate, Late Bikram Keshari Deo who won this seat in 1995 and 1990 as BJP candidate and also in 1985 as JNP candidate, Maheswar Barad who won this representing INC(I) in 1980 and as INC candidate in 1977.

Junagarh is part of Kalahandi (Lok Sabha constituency).
