= Golamunda =

- Village/Town
- Location in Odisha, India Golamunda (India) Golamunda (Asia) Golamunda (Earth)
- Coordinates: 20°3′47″N 82°59′47″E
- Country: India
- State: Odisha
- District: Kalahandi

Government
  - Body: Gram Panchayat Samiti
  - MP: Malabika Devi
  - MLA: Captain Dibya Shankar Mishra

Population (2001)
  - Total: 4,479

Languages
  - Official: Odia English
- Time zone: UTC+5:30 (IST)
- PIN: 766016
- Vehicle registration: OD 08
- Sex ratio: 52.1:47.9 ♂/♀
- Website: odisha.gov.in

Golamunda is a town and a block (Panchayat Samiti) in Golamunda Tehsil, Kalahandi, Odisha. Golamunda is 58 km from its district main city Bhawanipatna and 500 km from its state main city Bhubaneswar. Dharamgarh is the sub-divisional headquarters of Golamunda block.

== Demographics ==
Golamunda had a population of 5681 with 2852 males and 2829 females as per the 2011 Census. The total literacy population of Golamunda was 62.10%, compared to 72.87% of Odisha in 2011. Male and female literacy rates were 73.75% and 50.46% respectively.

== Administration ==
Golamunda block consists of 28 Gram Panchayats and 127 villages. The Vidhan Sabha constituency of Golamunda block is Junagarh.

== Educational Background ==
The education system of Golamunda town is well organised in terms of schools and colleges. Junior college is available for higher secondary education, established in 1989. Three U.P. Schools and one Govt. High School are present for primary and secondary education.
