= Dokarichanchara =

Tourist area in Odisha, India

Dokarichanchara Waterfalls
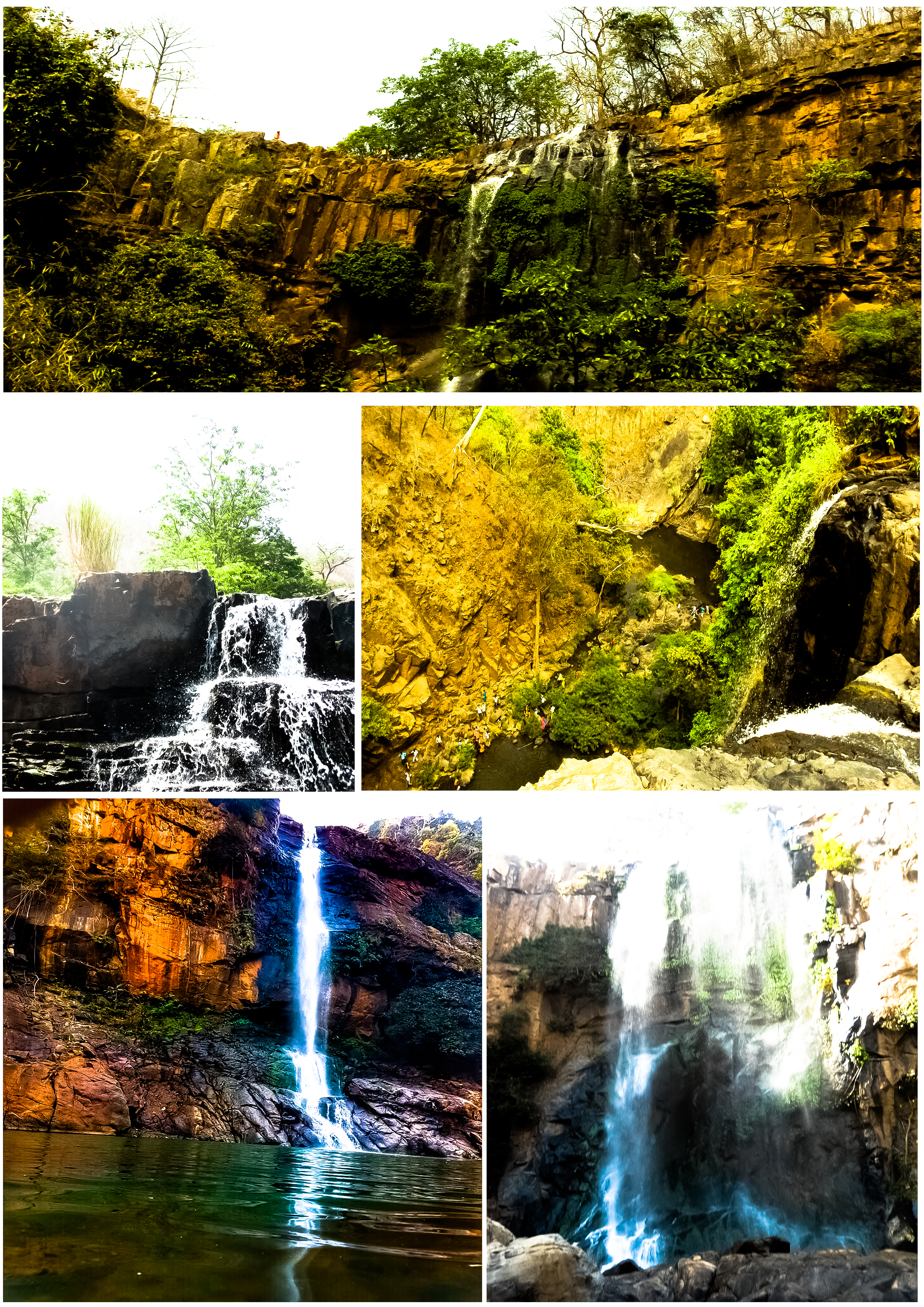

- Location within Odisha
- Location: Khaligarh, Koksara, Odisha
- Coordinates: 19°37′13.6″N 82°32′59.4″E
- Elevation: 150 ft (46 m)
- Total height: 100 ft (30 m)
- Number of drops: 2
- Watercourse: Behera River

Dokarichanchara (Odia: ଡୋକରୀଚଂଚରା) is a picnic spot and tourist place situated in Khaligarh village, Koksara, Kalahandi, Odisha, India.

== Tourism ==
About 80 years ago, a temple of Rama, one of the major deities in Hindusm was built here. Because of this Ram Navami, a 9-day-long festival, occurs every year, which attracts tourists from throughout Odisha.

== Gallery ==
=== Gudahandi ===
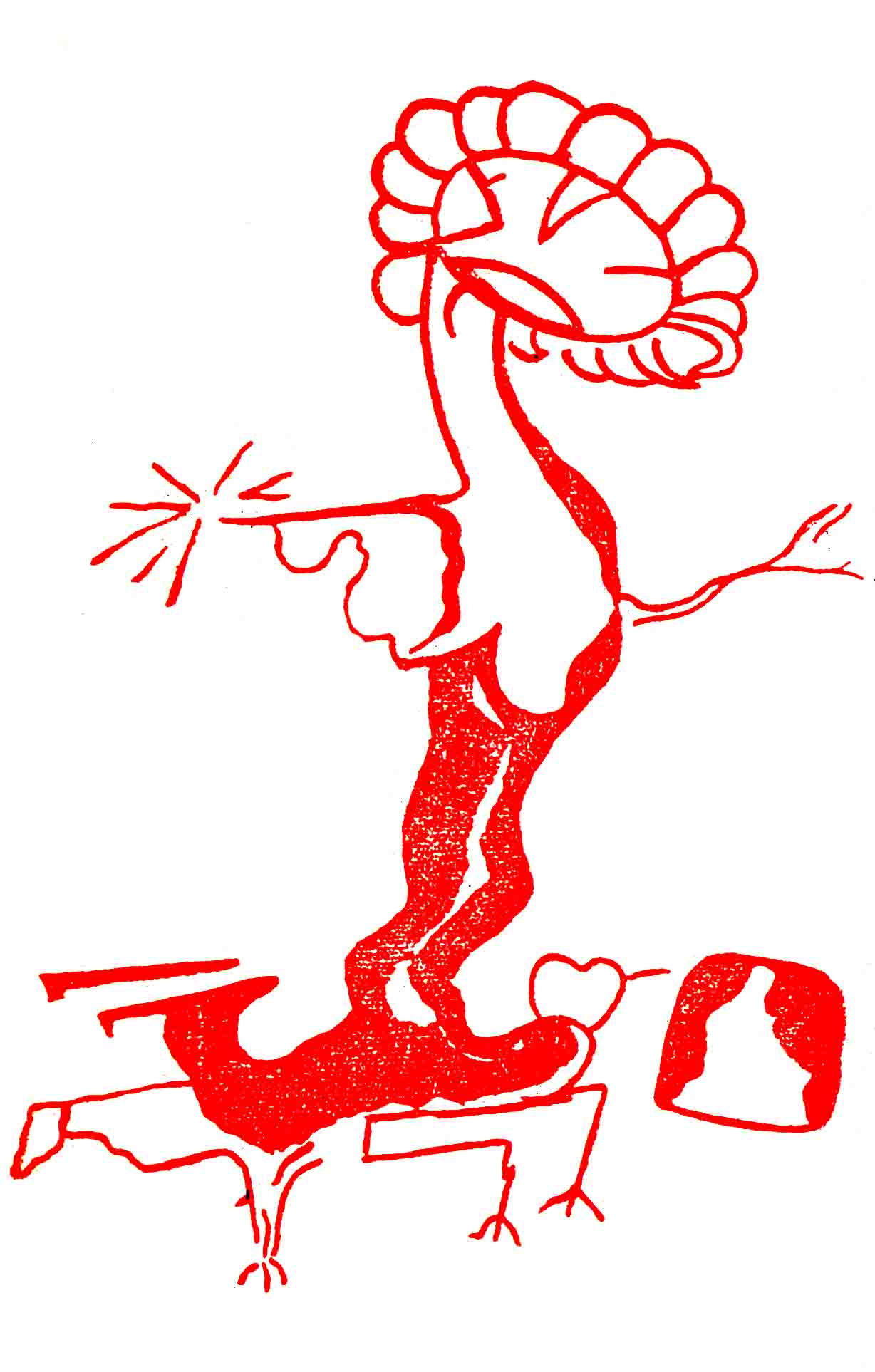
Gudahandi rock art

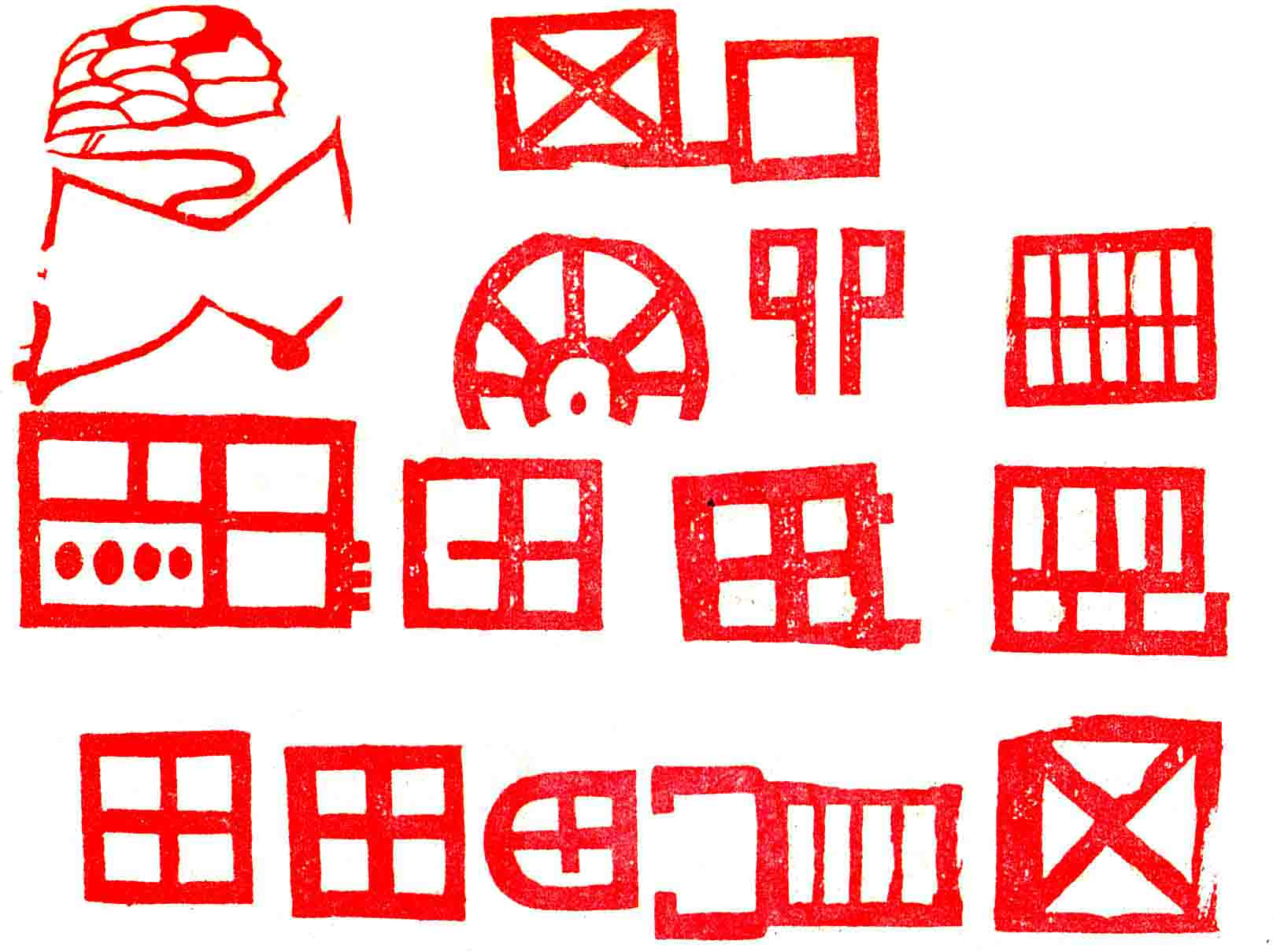
Paleothic rock paintings at Gudahandi Cave

=== Dokarichanchara Waterfalls ===
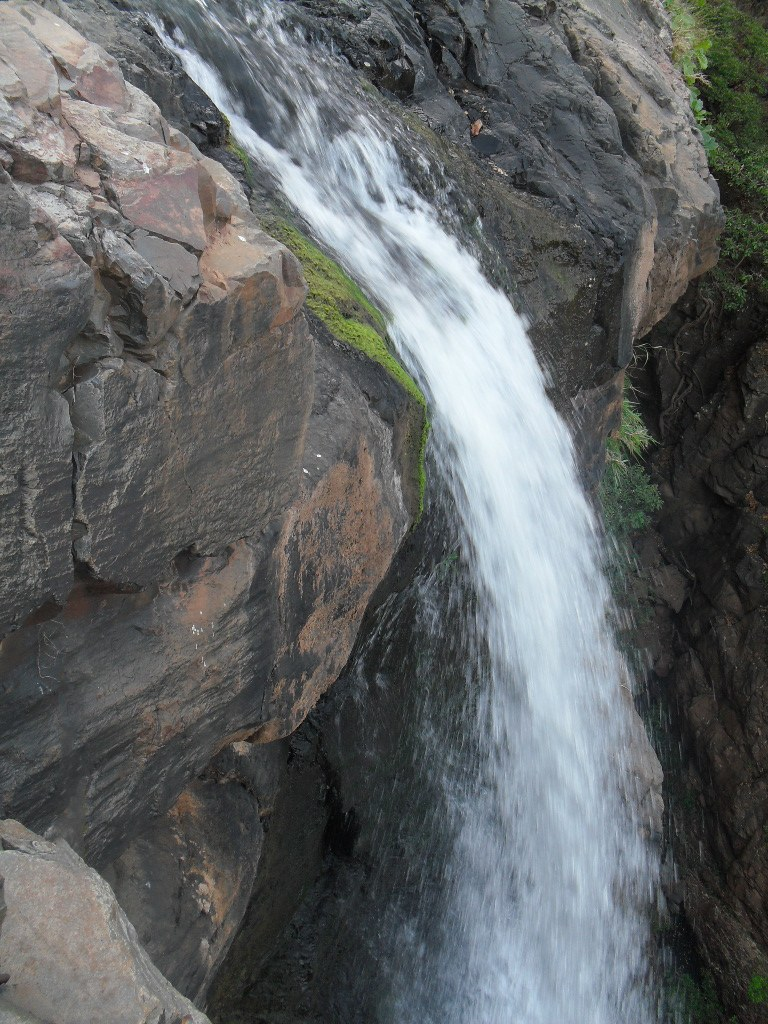

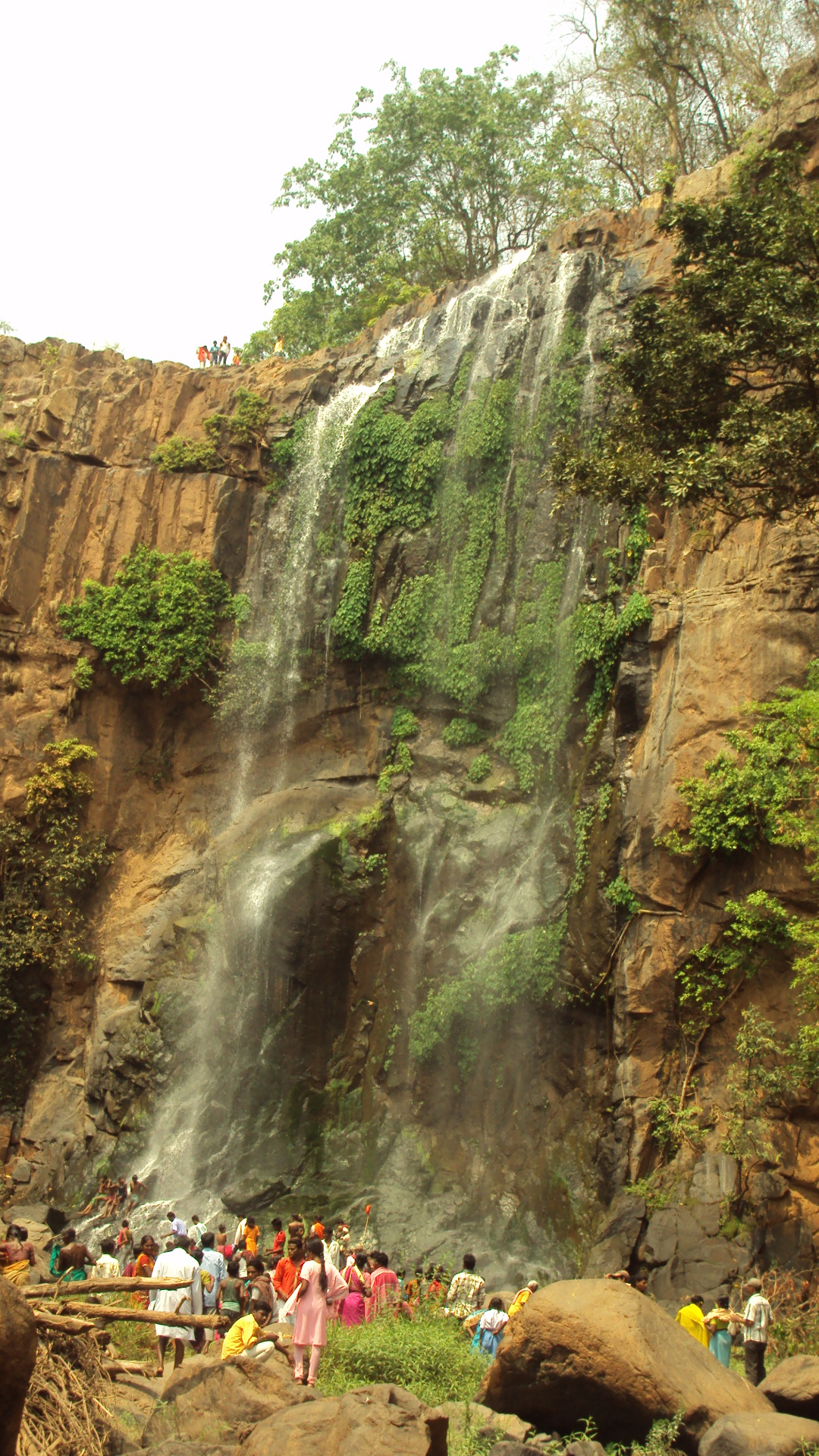

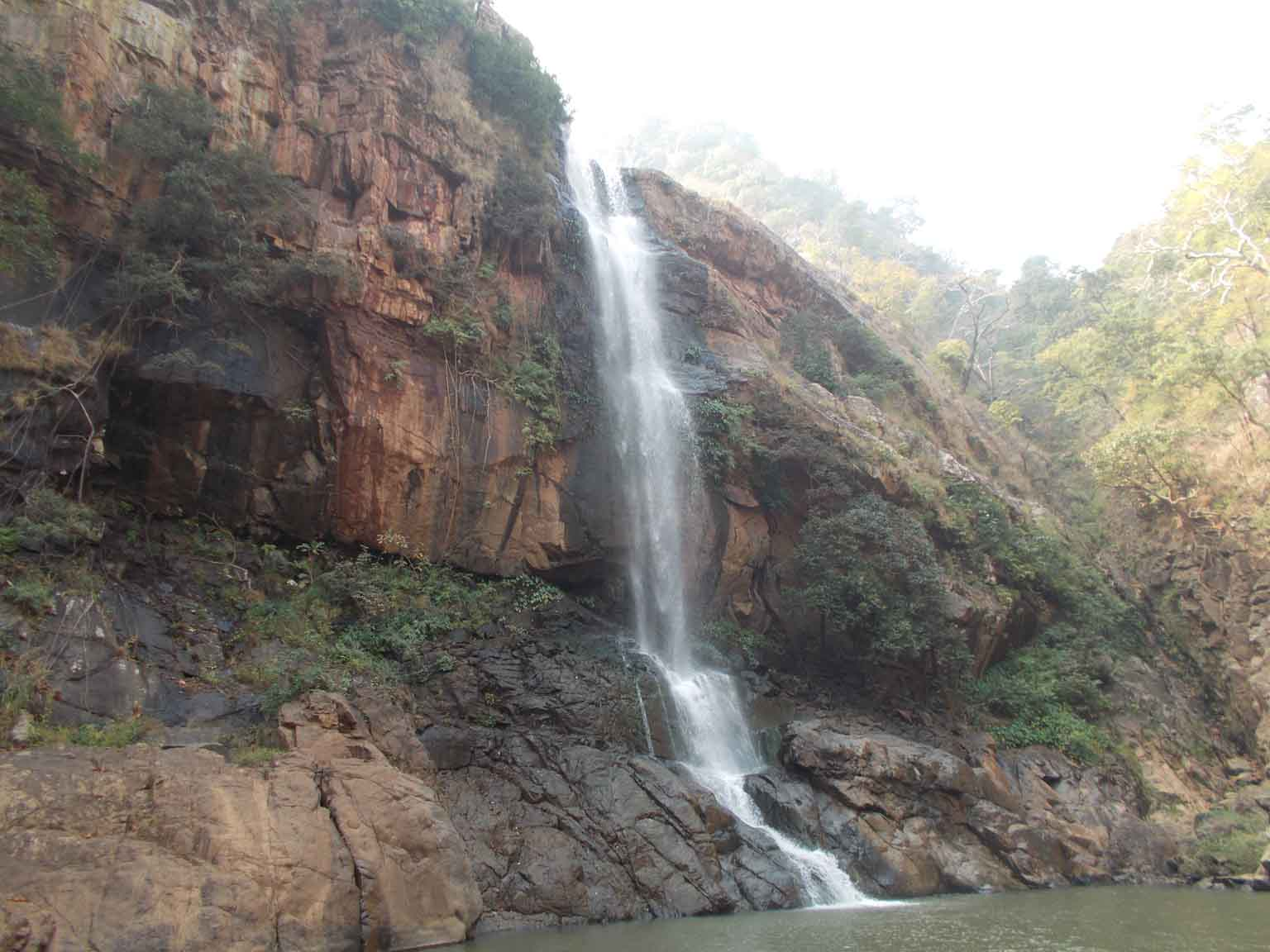

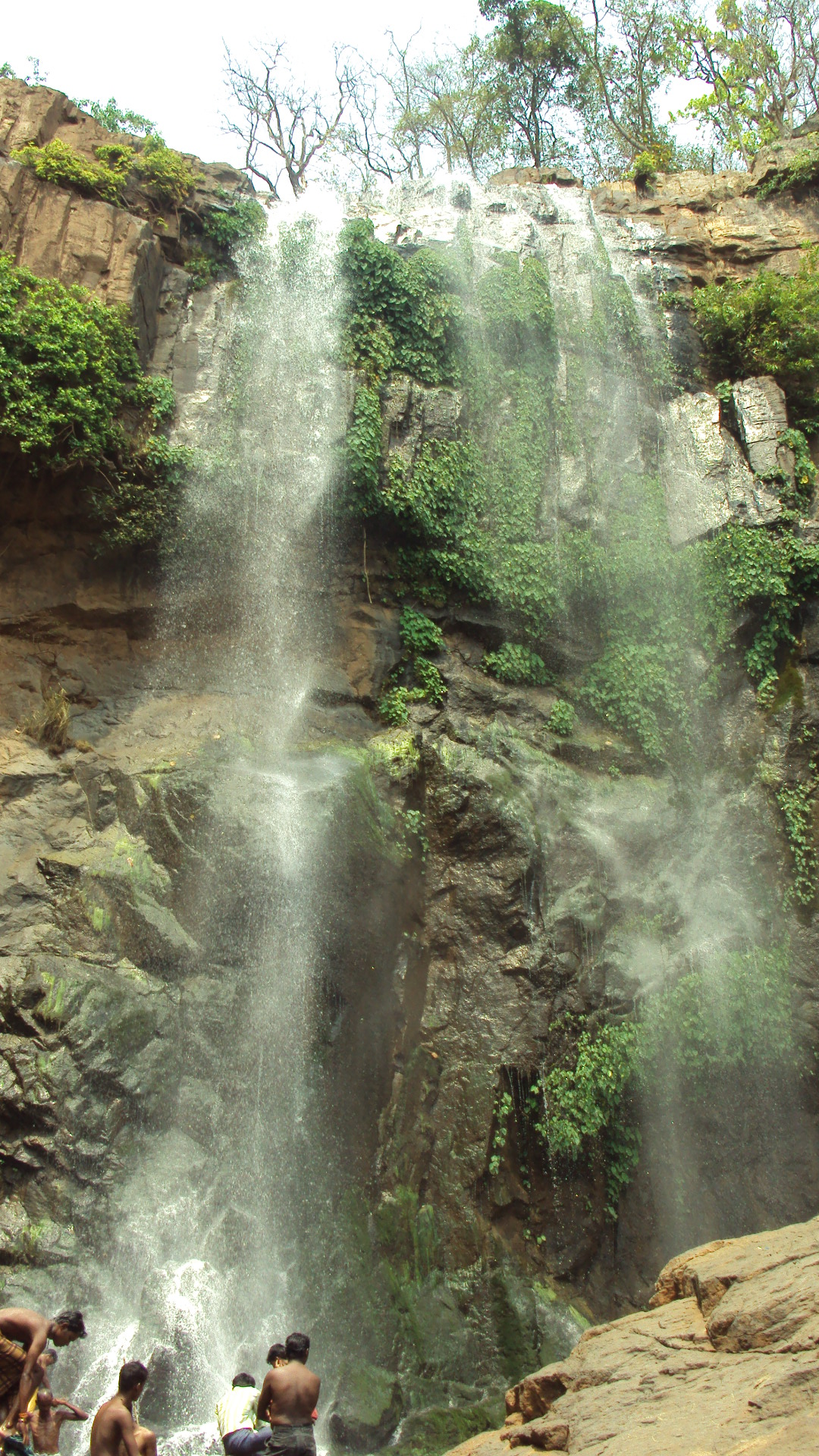

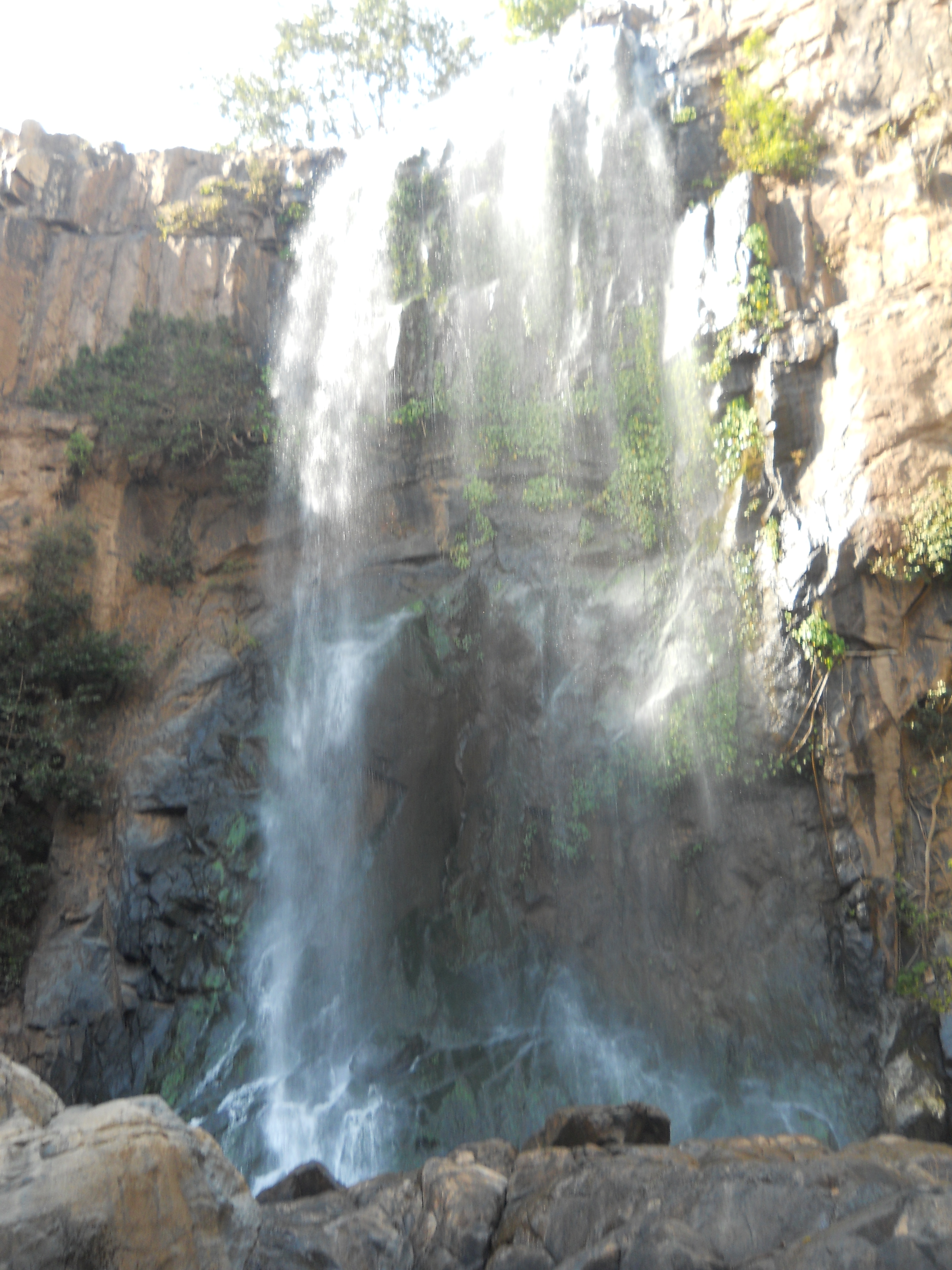

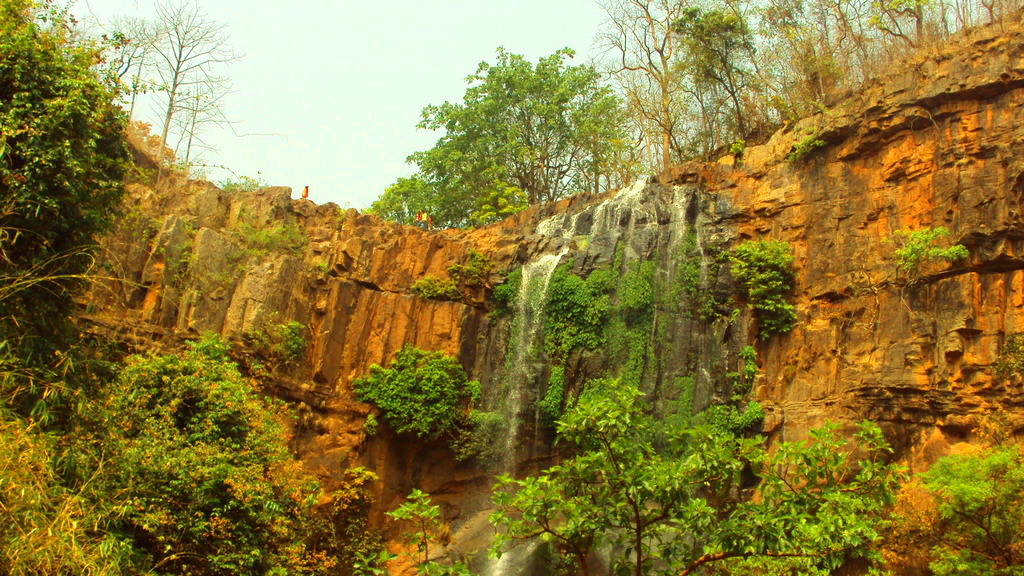

=== Ram Navami ===
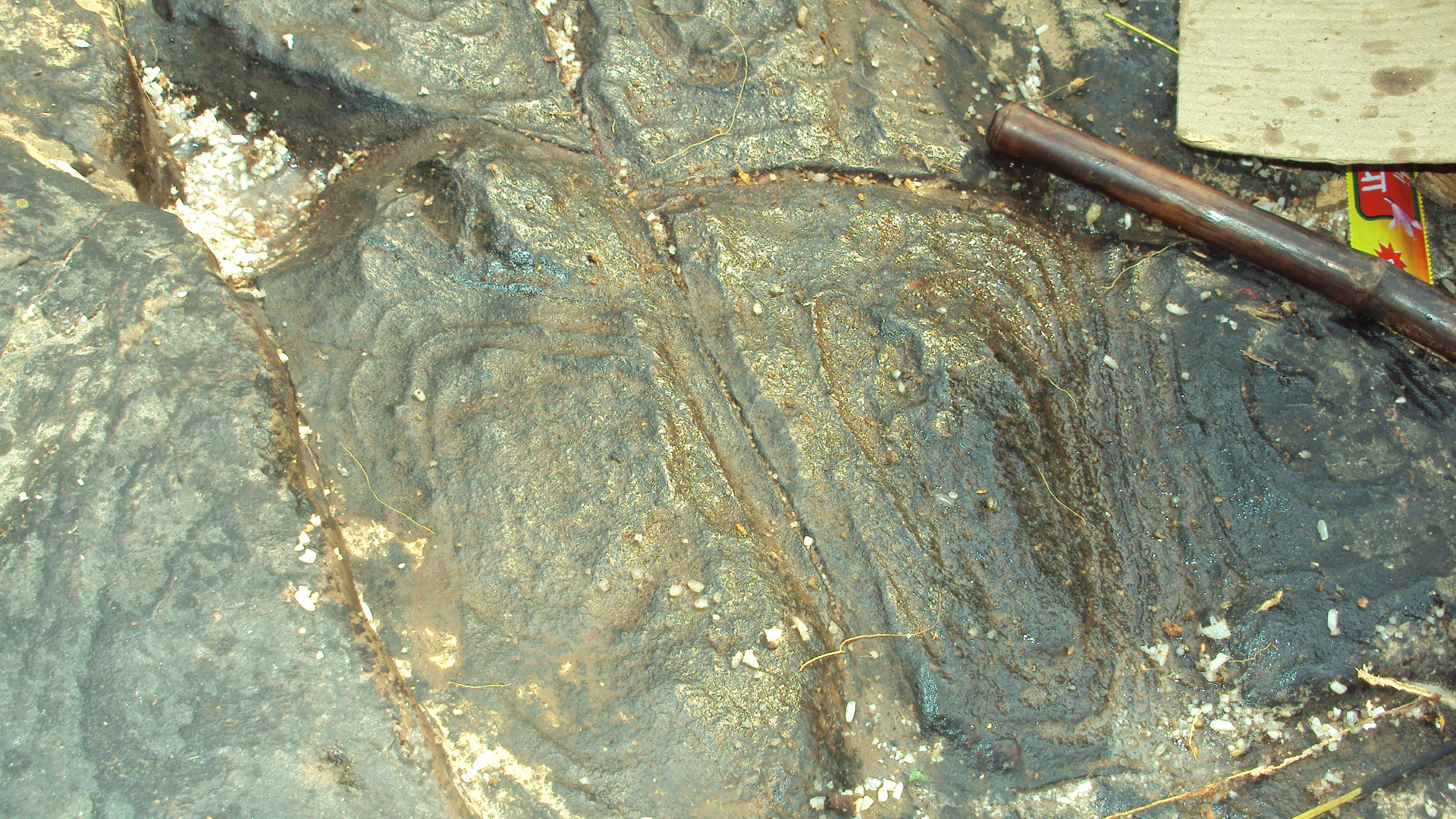

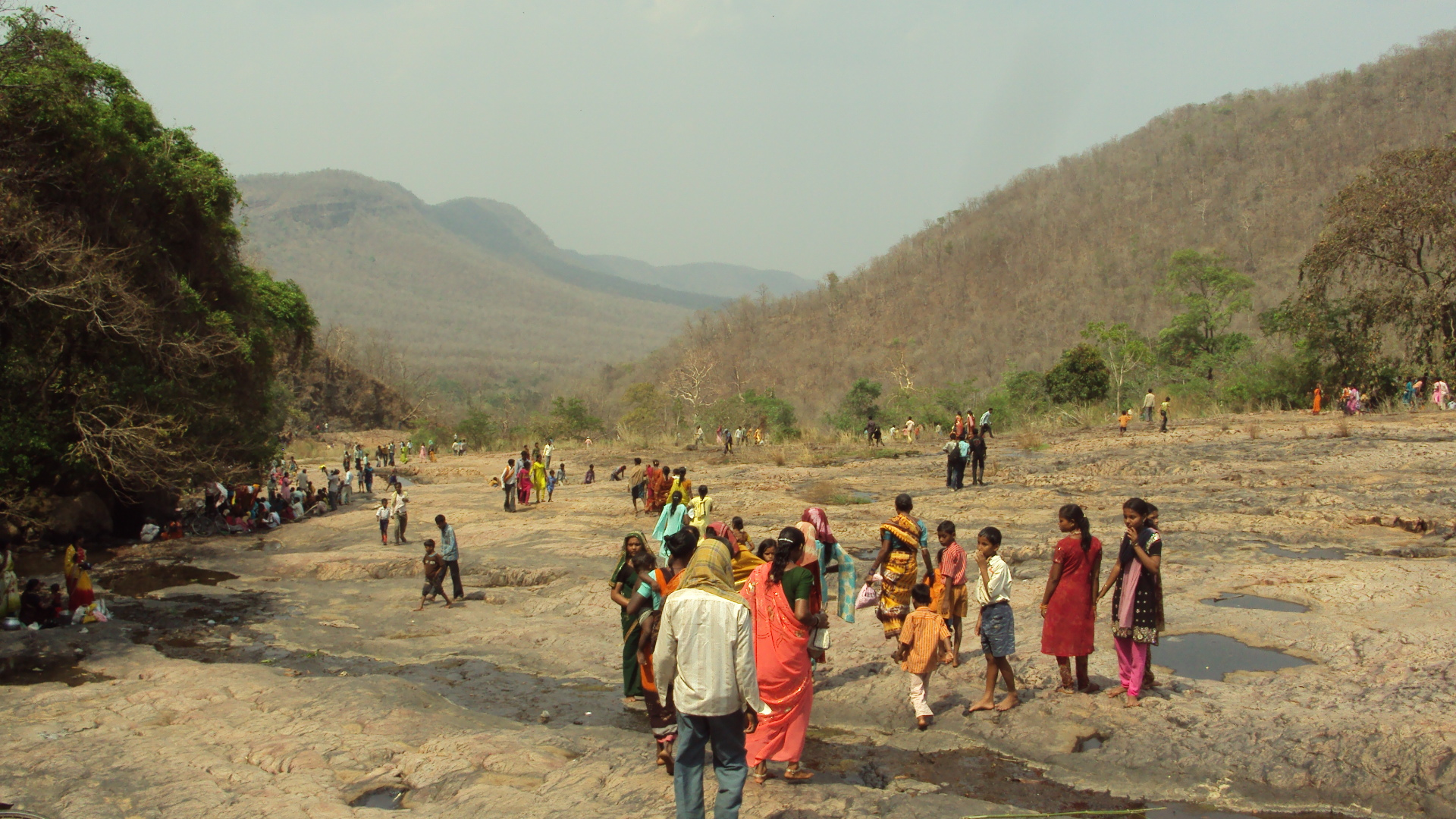

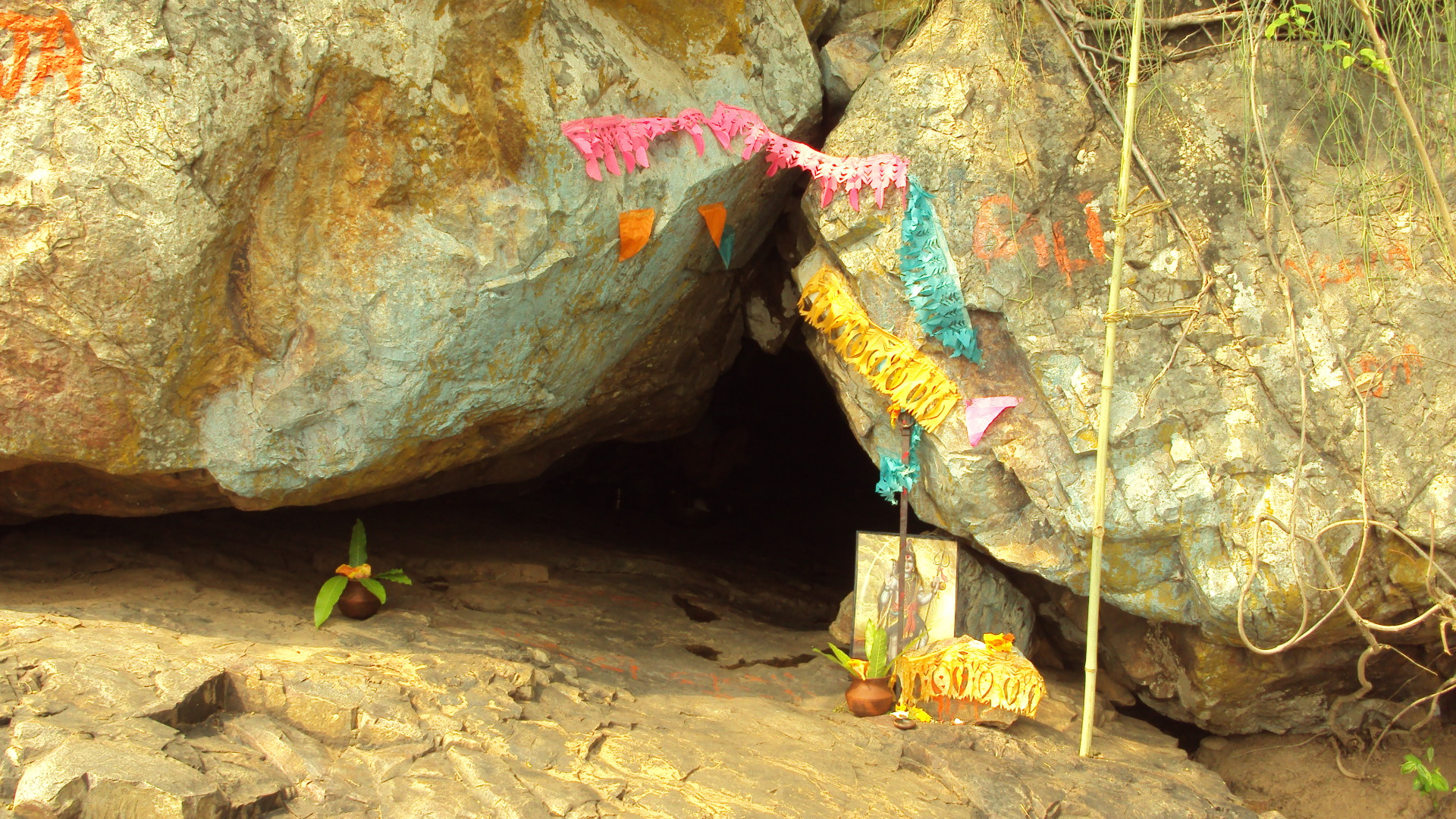

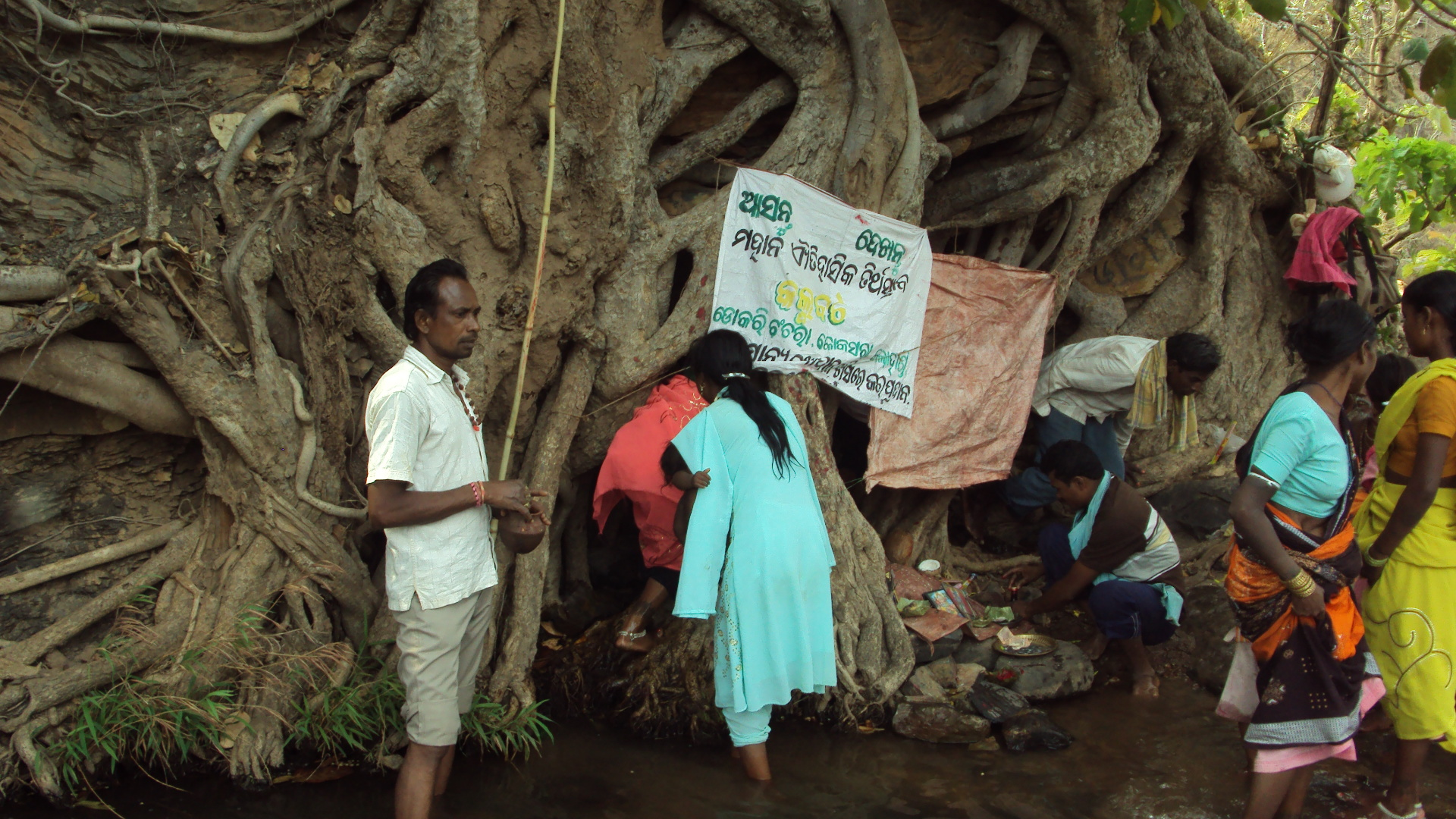

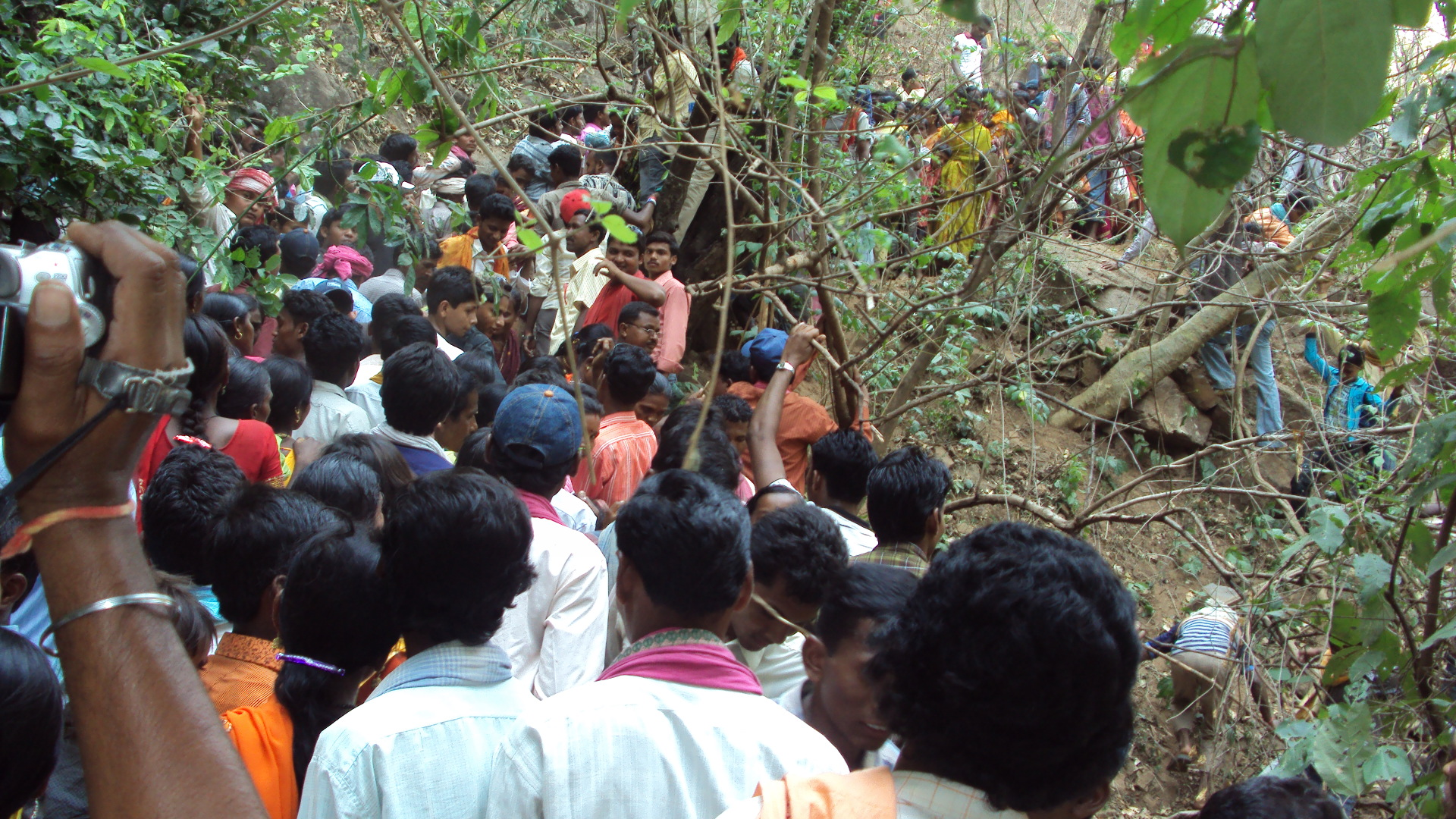

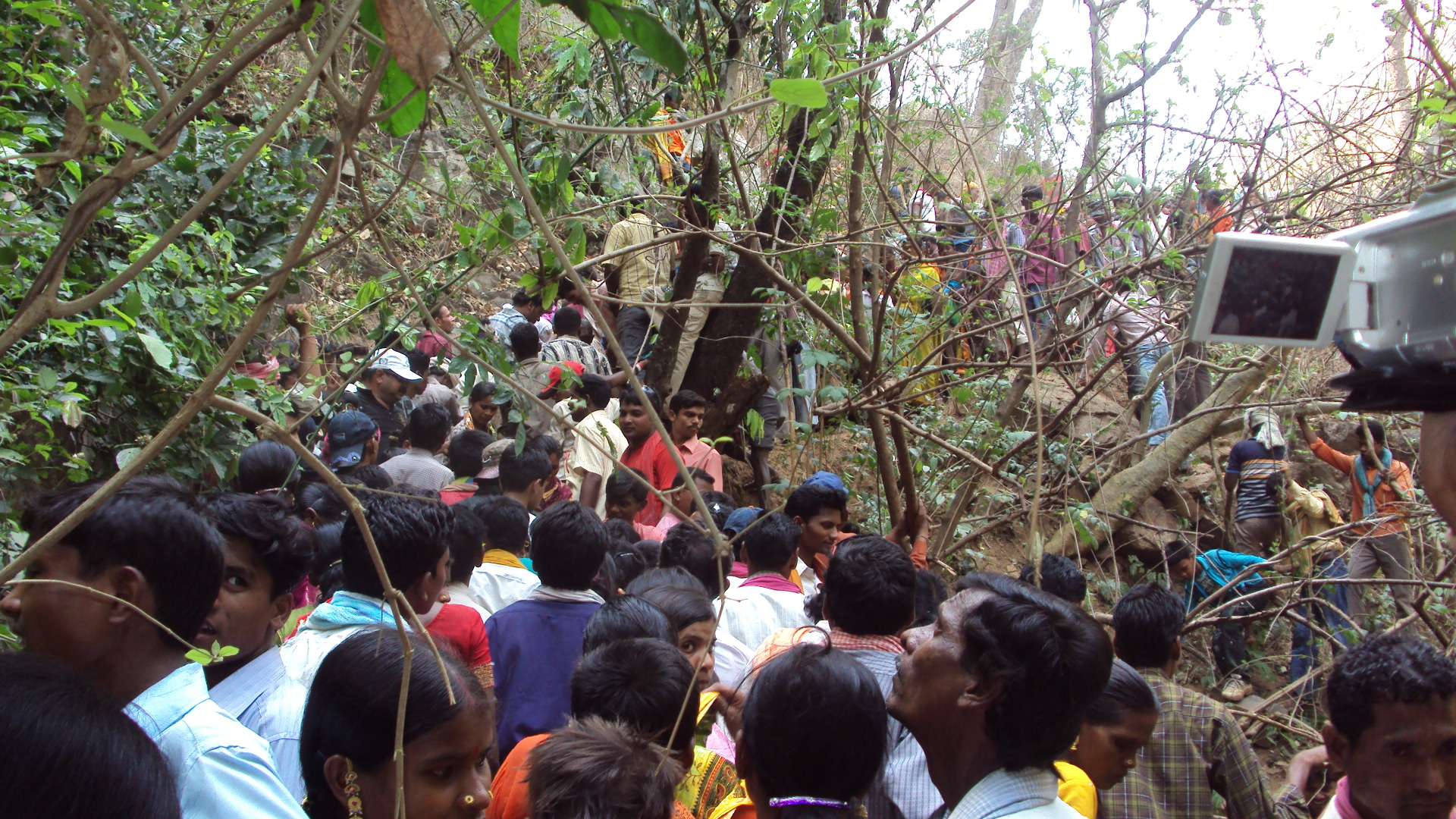
