= Kalampur =

Coordinates: 19.615°N 82.886°E

Kalampur is a town in the Dharamgarh sub-division of the Kalahandi district in India's Odisha State. The town is 35 kilometres (22 mi) from the district's main city Bhawanipatna, and 430 kilometres (270 mi) from the state capital Bhubaneswar.
