= Kalahandi Utsav =

Annual festival showcasing Kalahandi's rich culture, art, dance, and heritage

Kalahandi Utsav କଳାହାଣ୍ଡି ଉତ୍ସବ
- Kalahandi Utsav Poster in 2013
- Official name: Kalahandi Utsav Ghumura
- Begins: January 14
- Ends: January 17
- Frequency: Annual

Kalahandi Utsav (Odia: କଳାହାଣ୍ଡି ଉତ୍ସବ) also called "Kalahandi Utsav Ghumara" is an annual exhibition or festival celebrated along with district administration in Bhawanipatna and Dharamgarh of Kalahandi District in the Indian state of Odisha. Kalahandi Utsav is a platform to encourage, motivate and showcase the art, culture, music, drama, literature, handy crafts of Odisha globally.

== History ==
P.K. Jena, an ex-collector of Kalahandi first initiated the Kalahandi Utsav in 1997. Initially it was called Ghumura Mahotsav. Then it was organized at sub-division level at Dharamgarh by ex-sub-collector V. Karthikeya Pandian in 2003.

== Venue ==
It is celebrated at Lal Bahadur stadium in Bhawanipatna and Panchayat playground in Dharamgarh. More than 300 stalls appear at both venues.

== Performances ==
Hundreds of folk dance troupes and folk singers from different parts of the State and outside perform.

== Preparation ==
Mahavir Sanskruti Anusthan, a Cultural organization based in Bhawanipatna trains local performers of Kalahandi district.

== Gallery ==
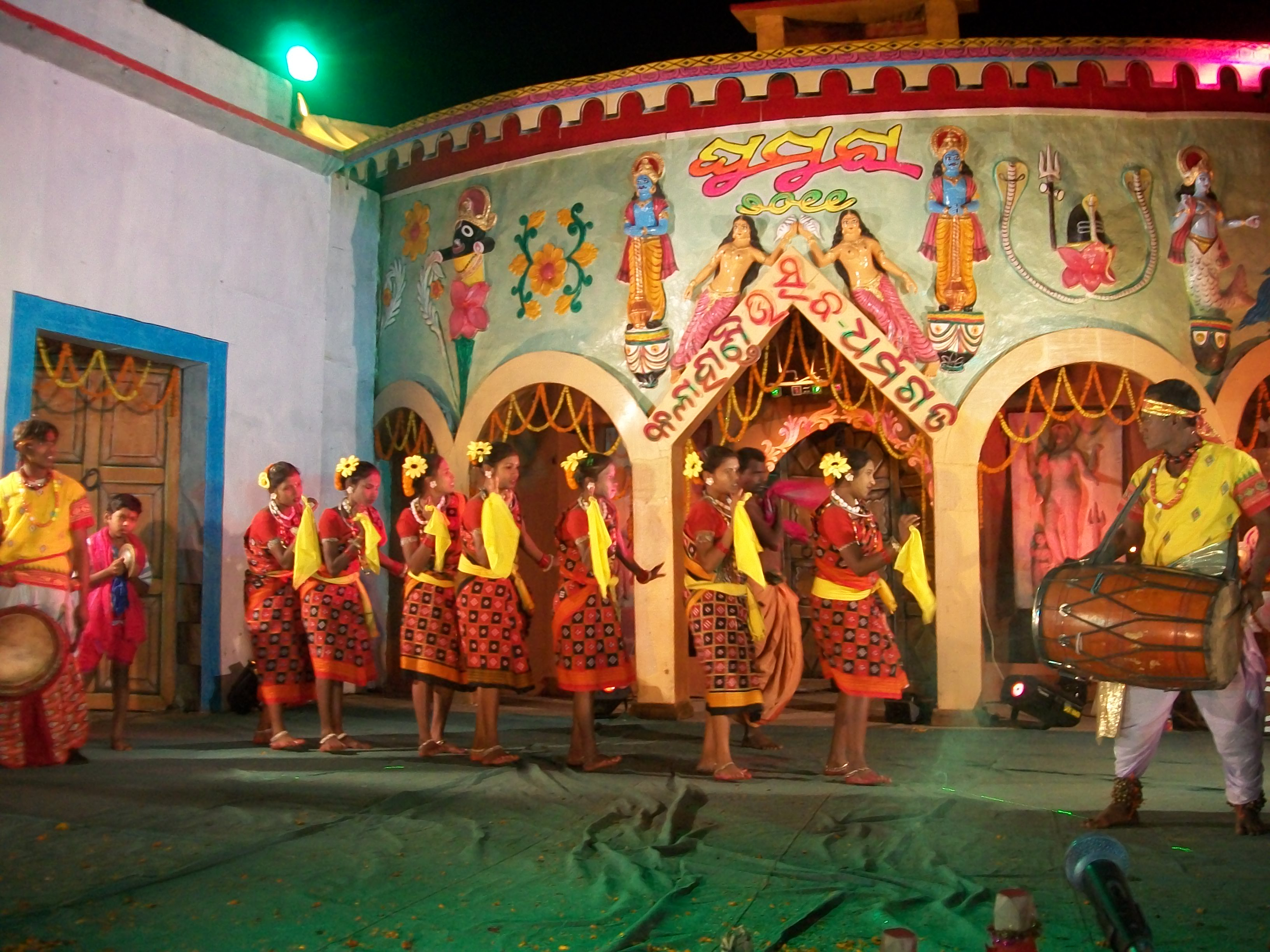
Folk dancers performing on 15th Kalahandi utsav 2011, Dharamgarh

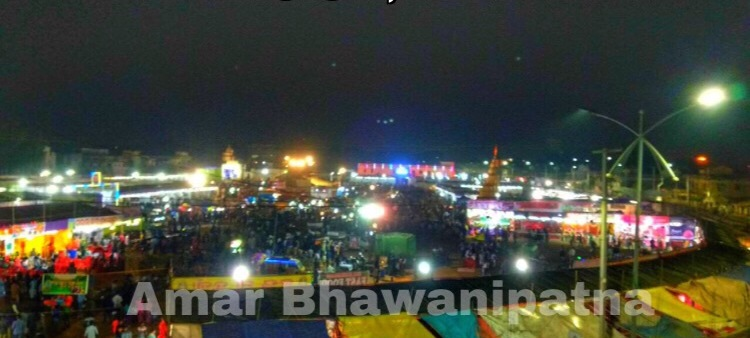
Overview of Lal Bahadur Stadium, Bhawanipatna during Kalahandi Utsav

Stage of Utsav

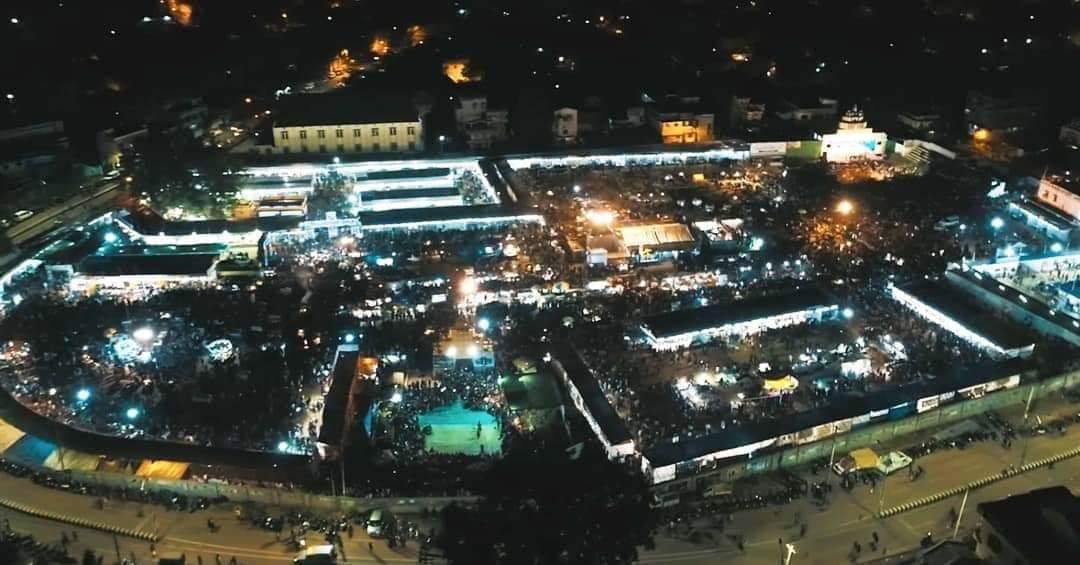
Kalahandi Utsav 2019, Bhawanipatna
