= Behera (disambiguation) =

Behera is a town in Kalahandi, Odisha, India.

Behera may also refer to:

- Behera Sahi, a village in Odisha
- Behera (surname), a family name of various communities
