= Mandakini =

Mandakini may refer to:

- Ganges in Hinduism, as considered to form the Milky Way in the sky
- Mandakini River, Uttarakhand, India
- Chandragiri River, also known as Payaswini and Mandakini, a river in India
- Mandakini (1999 film), a Sri Lankan film
- Mandakini (2024 film), an Indian Malayalam film

== People ==
- Mandakini (actress) (born 1963), Indian actress
- Mandakini Amte, Indian doctor and social worker
- Mandakini Behera (born 1947), Indian politician in Odisha
- Mandakini Gogate (1936–2010), Indian Marathi writer
- Mandakini Narayanan (died 2006), Indian Naxalite leader in Kerala
- Mandakini Trivedi, Indian dancer
