= Indo-American Arts Council =

- Founded: August 1, 1998; 28 years ago
- Founder: Aroon Shivdasani; Gopal Raju; Jonathan Hollander
- Type: 501(c)(3)
- Purpose: The arts
- Location: New York City, New York, United States
- Region served: New York City
- Key people: Aroon Shivdasani
- Website: www.iaac.us

The Indo-American Arts Council (IAAC) is an American non-profit cultural organization that promotes Indian theatre, art, film, fashion, music, dance, and literature in the United States. The Council was established in 1998 in New York City and is headed by Aroon Shivdasani. IAAC hosts cultural and artistic events throughout the year, including the annual New York Indian Film Festival, which showcases Indian and diaspora-related films.

== History ==
IAAC was founded on August 1, 1998 by the editor of India Abroad, Gopal Raju, American choreographer Jonathan Hollander and Aroon Shivdasani, to promote the Indian arts to mainstream American media. In 2001, IAAC established The New York Indian Film Festival (NYIFF) to promote Indian and diaspora-related film in the United States. In 2004, IAAC began its annual contemporary art exhibition, Erasing Borders: Exhibition of Contemporary Indian Art of the Diaspora, which features art related to the Indian Diaspora. In 2008, the council began its annual dance festival, Erasing Borders: Festival of Dance, which exhibits outdoor dance performances in Lower Manhattan.

Aroon Shivdasani serves as the council’s president and executive director, with Jonathan Hollander as vice president and co-founder. India Abroad journalist Aseem Chhabra is the Film Festival Director, Prachi Dalal is the director of the dance festival, and Anjali Maniam is the director of development. Shabana Azmi, Mallika Sarabhai, Deepa Mehta, Mira Nair, Madhur Jaffrey, Salman Rushdie, and Shashi Tharoor serve on the IAAC Advisory Board.

== Theater ==
IAAC works with several New York based theater companies, including The Lark Theatre and The Royal Shakespeare Company, and produces Indian Off-Broadway shows and play readings. The council also partners with The Lark Theater during its Playwright’s Festival each fall.

Past performances include:

- Salman Rushdie’s Midnights Children in 2003.
- Rajiv Joseph’s Bengal Tiger at the Baghdad Zoo in 2007.
- Atul Kumar’s The Blue Mug starring Ranvir Shorey and Konkona Sen Sharma in 2010.
- Girish Karnad’s Broken Images starring Shabana Azmi in 2010.
- Rehana Lew Mirza’s Barriers starring Pooja Kumar and Sunkrish Bala in 2011.

== Art ==
The council hosts several art exhibitions throughout the year in galleries across the Eastern United States, to promote the work of emerging Indian artists, as well as established artists. IAAC frequently collaborates with local galleries in New York City, as well as The Metropolitan Museum of Art, Sotheby's, The Queens Museum of Art, and The Rubin Museum of Art. They also host benefit auctions and Indian Folk Art markets in the fall.

On June 29, 2011, a tribute to the late Indian painter M.F. Husain was held at the Christie's Gallery in Rockefeller Center.

Each year, IAAC holds its annual art exhibition called Erasing Borders: Exhibition of Contemporary Indian Art of the Diaspora. It is the council’s largest art exhibition. It features the artwork of the Indian diaspora, or those who can trace their roots to the Indian Subcontinent. The exhibition was founded in 2004, and is curated by Sundaram Tagore. The exhibition tours across the boroughs of New York City at The Queens Museum of Art, as well as The Charles B. Wang Center in Stony Brook, New York, and the Jorgenson Gallery at the University of Connecticut.

== Film ==
IAAC screens newly released Indian films throughout the year, both Bollywood and independent films, and holds Q&A sessions with the filmmaker after the screening. Such screenings have included 7 Khoon Maaf, Sita Sings the Blues, and My Name is Khan.

=== New York Indian Film Festival (NYIFF) ===
NYIFF is IAAC's annual film festival which is held in New York City at Tribeca Cinemas. It was previously known as the Mahindra Indo American Arts Council Film Festival (MIAAC), and features films from the Indian Subcontinent, as well as from the Indian diaspora. About 40 films are screened, including features, shorts, documentaries, and animated films.

The first MIAAC Film Festival took place on November 1-4th, 2001 at Manhattan’s Imagin Asian theatre. In 2011, the festival was renamed The New York Indian Film Festival, with Aseem Chhabra as the festival director. Many films had their world, national, or New York premiere at the festival, including Monsoon Wedding, Born Into Brothels, Bride and Prejudice, The Namesake, and Slumdog Millionaire.

The festival also holds a sidebar retrospective on a prominent Indian filmmaker, actor, or artist. Past retrospectives have included Smita Patil, Mira Nair, and Rabindranath Tagore.

== Fashion ==
IAAC infrequently holds fashion shows featuring the work of Indian designers, and also offers invitations to international fashion shows. The council frequently collaborates with the boutique Misha Nicole, jewelry designer Amrita Singh, and Top Chef host and jewelry designer Padma Lakshmi.

Other featured designers:

- Naeem Khan
- Payal Singhal
- Shekhar Rahate
- Stephanie Singh
- Babita Malkani
- Sachin + Babi

== Dance ==
Several dance performances are held throughout the year. IAAC's largest is the Erasing Borders: Festival of Indian Dance. The Erasing Borders dance festival was launched in August 2008 to promote Indian dance in New York City. Each year, the festival offers several outdoor dance performances in Lower Manhattan, in various styles of modern and classical Indian dance, such as Bharatanatyam, Kathak, Mohiniattam, and Manipuri. Dance workshops are offered throughout the program. The festival is also run in conjunction with The Battery Dance Company’s Annual Downtown Dance Festival. Each year, IAAC holds submissions for dancers to participate in the festival. Most notable performers include dancers from the Natya Academy, Rukmini Vijayakumar, and Mandakini Trivedi.

== Music ==
IAAC holds concerts and CD release performances for Indian musicians of various styles, including Indian Classical, Indian Folk, Jazz, electronica, and lounge music. Ustad Amjad Ali Khan, Samir Chatterjee, Kiran Ahluwalia, and A. R. Rahman are a few of the musicians who have performed with IAAC.

Performances have been held The Metropolitan Museum of Art, Carnegie Hall, The Tribeca Performing Arts Center, and the fashion boutique Misha Nicole.

On July 30, 2006, IAAC held its first music festival in Central Park, with performances by Salman Ahmad, Marina Ahmad Alam, Sivamani, and Karsh Kale.

== Literature ==
IAAC hosts book launches and signings for Indian authors in New York City, and are usually held at a local art gallery. The genres of books released include fiction, non-fiction, poetry, cookbooks, and graphic novels.

The council has hosted book launches for authors such as:

- Anupama Chopra’s King of Bollywood: Shah Rukh Khan and the seductive world of Indian cinema (2007).
- Madhur Jaffrey’s Climbing the Mango Trees: A Memoir of a Childhood in India (2006).
- Salman Rushdie’s The Enchantress of Florence (2008).
- Vivan Sundaram's Amrita Sher-Gil: A Self-portrait in Letters & Writings (2010).
- Keshni Kashyap’s Tina’s Mouth (2012).
