= Yumi Lambert =

Belgian model

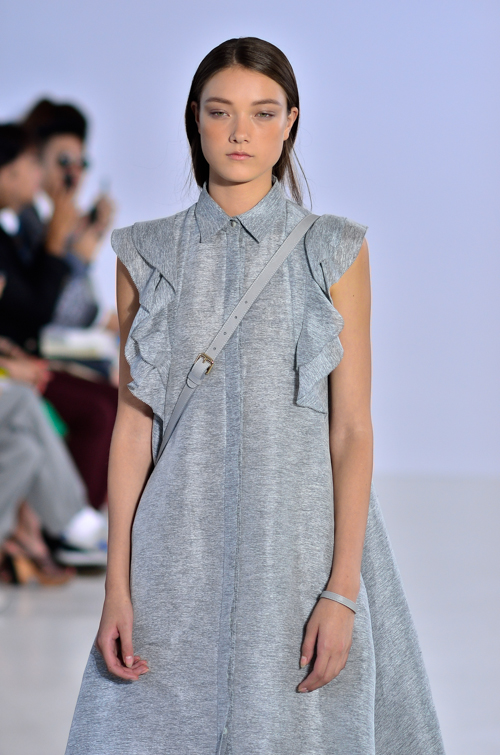
- Lambert in Philosophy's Spring/Summer 2014 show in New York City on September 11, 2013
- Born: Laura Yumi Lambert; 11 April 1995 (age 30); Brussels, Belgium
- Occupation: Model
- Years active: 2012-present
- Modelling information
- Height: 1.80 m (5 ft 11 in)
- Hair colour: Brown
- Eye colour: Green
- Agency: IMG Models (Worldwide); Uno Models (Barcelona); Seeds Management GmbH (Berlin); Scoop Models (Copenhagen); Stockholmsgruppen (Stockholm)

Laura Yumi Lambert (born 11 April 1995) is a Belgian model.

== Early life ==
Lambert was born on 11 April 1995 in Brussels, Belgium. Her paternal grandmother is Japanese, and she has a brother named Maxime.

== Career ==
=== 2012: Career beginnings ===
At the age of 15, Lambert visited Dominique Models in Brussels and was signed. In September 2012, Lambert walked in Spring/Summer 2013 fashion shows for sixteen designers, including Prada, Chanel and Miu Miu. She was featured in Chanel's Spring/Summer 2013 ad campaign and walked in their Pre-Fall 2013 runway show in December.

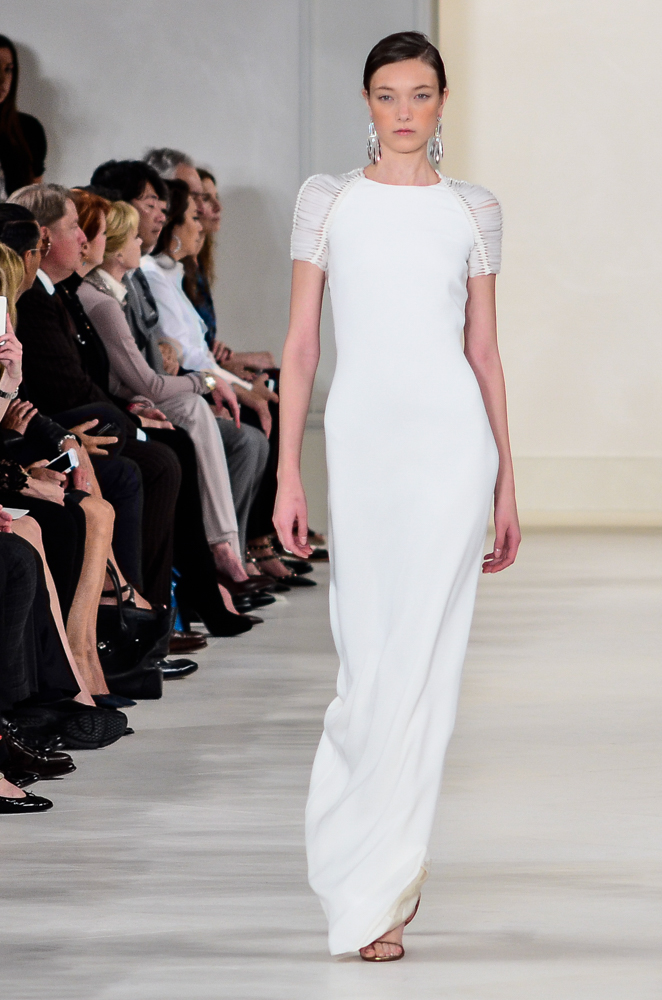
Lambert in Ralph Lauren's Spring/Summer 2015 show on September 14, 2014

=== 2013 ===
Lambert was featured in shows for Spring Couture 2013 collections by Chanel and Iris van Herpen in January of that year. During February and March, she walked in Autumn/Winter 2013 fashion shows for 39 designers, including 3.1 Phillip Lim, Oscar de la Renta and Maison Martin Margiela. In July, she walked in the Fall Haute Couture 2013 shows for Dior, Chanel, Alexis Mabille, and Yiqing Yin. She walked in Spring/Summer 2014 runway shows for 38 designers, including Rodarte, Yohji Yamamoto and Calvin Klein in September. Lambert modeled for Spring/Summer 2014 campaigns by Gap China, Hermès, Peter Pilotto for Target, Orla Kiely, and Ter et Bantine.

=== 2014 ===
During the Autumn/Winter 2014 season, spanning from January to March 2014, Lambert walked for 25 designers, including Jeremy Scott, Moschino and Comme des Garçons. Also in January, she walked in Spring Haute Couture 2014 shows for Vionnet, Ulyana Sergeenko, and Alexis Mabille. She was also featured in Chloe Gosselin's Autumn/Winter 2014 campaign. In June, she walked in Moshino's Spring/Summer 2015 Menswear fashion show and the following month, she walked in Fall Haute Couture 2014 shows for Dior, Alexis Mabille, Bouchra Jarrar, Elie Saab, and Vionnet. Lambert was featured in shows for Spring/Summer 2015 collections by 28 designers, including Ralph Lauren, Balenciaga and Givenchy in September and was featured in Sachin & Babi's Spring/Summer 2015 campaign. She also walked in the Victoria's Secret Fashion Show in December, as well as the Pre-Fall 2015 show for Esprit Dior.

=== 2015 ===
In January 2015, Lambert walked in Spring Haute Couture 2015 shows for Viktor & Rolf, Versace, and Dior, as well as Max Mara's Pre-Fall 2015 show. She walked in runway shows for Autumn/Winter 2015 collections by BCBG Max Azria, Gabriela Cadena, Jason Wu, Public School, Prabal Gurung, Donna Karan, Narciso Rodriguez, Jeremy Scott, Anna Sui, Ralph Lauren, Gucci, Philipp Plein, Moschino, Versace, Blumarine, Jil Sander, Dolce & Gabbana, Each x Other, Dries van Noten, Rochas, Vionnet, Roland Mouret, Rick Owens, Dior, Nina Ricci, Chloé, and Kenzo.

== Personal life ==
In her free time, Lambert enjoys drawing manga and listening to music. Her favourite band is Arcade Fire.
