= Health in the Republic of the Congo =

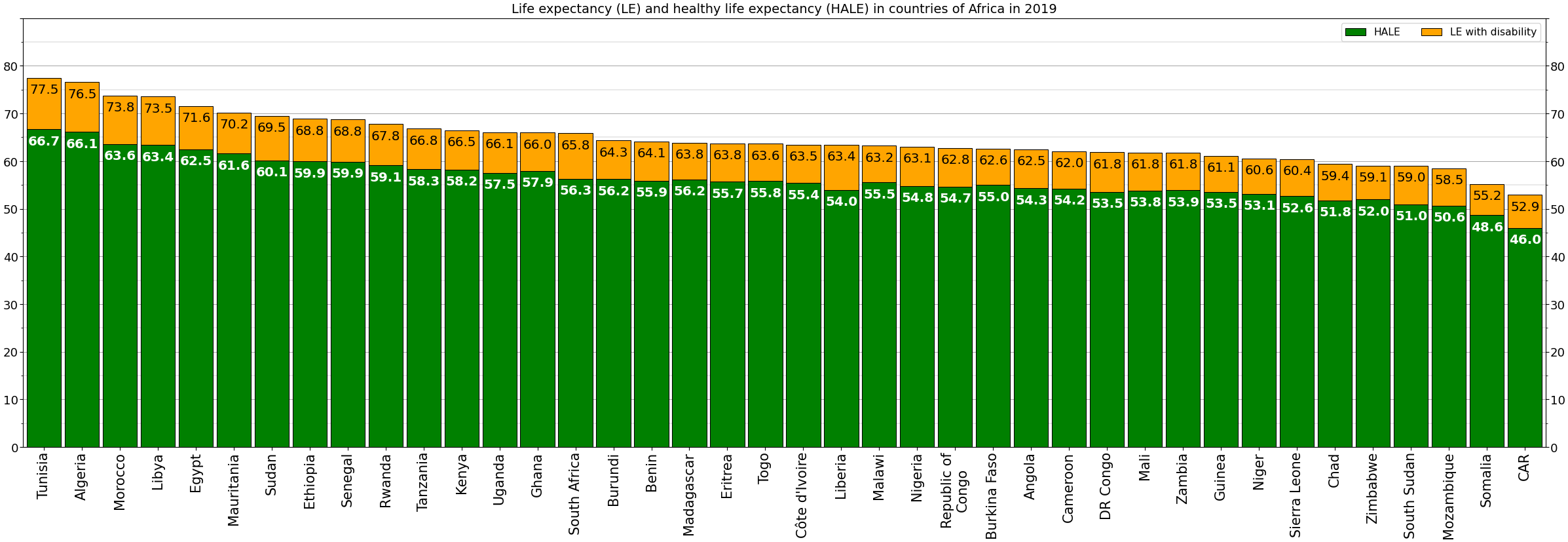
Life expectancy in the Republic of Congo

The Republic of the Congo faces a number of ongoing health challenges.

The Human Rights Measurement Initiative finds that the Republic of the Congo is fulfilling 63.7% of what it should be fulfilling for the right to health based on its level of income. When looking at the right to health with respect to children, the Republic of the Congo achieves 90.3% of what is expected based on its current income. In regards to the right to health amongst the adult population, the country achieves only 75.9% of what is expected based on the nation's level of income. The Republic of the Congo falls into the "very bad" category when evaluating the right to reproductive health because the nation is fulfilling only 25.0% of what the nation is expected to achieve based on the resources (income) it has available.

== Health infrastructure ==
Public expenditure health was at 8.9% of the GDP in 2004, whereas private expenditure on health related costs was at 1.3% of private income. Health expenditure was at US$30 per capita in 2004. There were 20 doctors per 100,000 persons in the early 2000s (decade).

There were 328 medical facilities in the Republic of the Congo in 2019. Hospitals include the following:

- Abala l’Hôpital de Base, Plateaux
- Adolphe A Hôpital Général, Pointe Noire
- Brazzaville Hospital, Brazzaville
- Djambala l’Hôpital de Base, Plateaux
- Dolisie l’Hôpital de Base, Niari
- Dpolisie Hôpital Général, Niari
- Ewo Hôpital, Cuvette-Ouest
- Gamboma l’Hôpital de Base, Plateaux
- Hospital 31 July D'Owando, Owando, Cuvette
- Impfondo Hôpital Comboutique, Likouala Department
- Kindamba Hôpital Comboutique, Pool Department
- Kinkala Hôpital Comboutique, Pool Department
- Linzolo l’Hôpital de Base, Pool Department
- Loandjili Hôpital Général, Pointe Noire
- Madingou Hospital Comboutique, Bouenza
- Makélékélé l’Hôpital de Base, Brazzaville
- Mfouati Hospital Comboutique, Bouenza
- Military Hospital of Pointe-Noire, Pointe-Noire
- Mindouli Hôpital Comboutique, Pool Department
- Mouyondzi Hospital Comboutique, Bouenza
- Mpissa l’Hôpital de Base, Brazzaville
- Nkayi Hôpital Comboutique, Bouenza
- Okoyo Hôpital, Cuvette-Ouest
- Ouesso l’Hôpital de Base, Sangha
- Pioneer Christian Hospital, Impfondo, Likouala Department
- Securex Hospital, Brazzaville
- Sibiti Hôpital Comboutique, Lékoumou
- Talagaï l’Hôpital de Base, Brazzaville
- Tié-Tié l’Hôpital de Base, Pointe Noire
- University Hospital of Brazzaville, Brazzaville

== Health status ==
=== Life expectancy ===
The 2014 CIA estimated average life expectancy in the Republic of the Congo was 58.52 years.

=== Endemic diseases ===
The entire population of the Republic of the Congo is at high risk of malaria and transmission is intense all year round. The annual reported number of malaria cases in 2012 was 117,640 with 623 deaths.

Yellow fever is also endemic to the Congo.

=== HIV/AIDS ===
The 2013 HIV prevalence is at 3.4% among 15- to 49-year-olds.

=== Malnutrition ===
A large proportion of the population is undernourished.
