= Behera (title) =

Honorific title in Indian state Odisha

The behera is an honorific title among the Odia in India. Formerly Dala-Behera was a title reserved for the leader of a group of soldiers.

== As a title ==
The Behera is an Odia title found in people from various communities of Odisha.

- Royal writers of Jagannath Temple, Puri belonging to Karana community bear the title "Behera". Behera Karana servitors of Jagannath Temple Puri are also associated with the ancient Sari Bandha ritual (Turban tying) and tie turbans on new servitors of various communities on behalf or as representative of the Puri Gajapati King to initiate them into the temple fold.
- The Behera surname is also found in the Chasa Khandayat community of Odisha.
- Devangas of Ganjam district who are weaver by profession also use the title of Behera because king of Ganjam offered the title of Behera to Devangs for their weaving skills.
- Brahmins of Sambalpur and Kalahandi in Odisha also use the title of Behera.
- Behera title is also found in the Gopal community of Odisha.

== Notable people ==
- Bhagabat Behera, Former Cabinet Minister (O.L.A)
- Bhubaneswar Behera, Indian Scholar.
- Chakradhar Behera, Freedom Fighter & Politician.
- Daitari Behera, Indian Politician.
- Deepak Behera, Indian Cricketer.
- Dharmananda Behera, Indian Politician
- Digambar Behera, Indian Physician.
- Jayanta Behera, Indian Cricketer.
- Jayanti Behera, Indian Sprinter.
- Lokanath Behera, D.G.P of Kerala state Police.
- Madhusmita Behera, Indian Cricketer.
- Mandakini Behera, Indian Politician.
- Nandita Behera, Indian odissi Dancer.
- Natraj Behera, Indian Cricketer.
- Niranjan Behera, Indian Cricketer.
- Prasanta Behera, Indian Politician.
- Ritwik Behera, American cricketer
- Shashi Bhusan Behera, Indian Politician
