= Niari =

Indian caste in the state of Odisha

Niari is a caste in the state of Odisha in India. This caste belongs to Khandayat (caste), a part of Kshatriya Community as per the Hindu's chaturvarna system. This community is very rare across India belong to upper caste whose occupational activity is running local business like sugar mills, chudakuta work (making flattened rice) and mudikuta (making puffed rice).

The natives of Niari community are popularly called "Radhi", as their rice beating sound was like the instrument's rhythm.

== History ==
Niari, originally belonged to the Kshatriya community which is a warrior class in the Indian subcontinent and a higher ranked landlord caste in Odisha. They use surnames such as Parida (meaning power), Behera (meaning head of a group), Patra, Nayak, etc.

During the year of 1866 the east coast of India from Madras northwards was affected by a famine known as Orissa famine of 1866 as the impact of the famine was greatest in the region of Orissa, now Odisha, which at that time was quite isolated from the rest of India. The catastrophic famine wiped out a third of the population of coastal Odisha. This led to loss of lives and livelihood of the people and forced many people to switch different professions.So people from Niari community became unemployed and adopted the profession of farming, some started doing cottage industries and started their business like running sugar mills preparing flattened rice (a major source of food in battle and in disaster and also used as offering or prasad to the deity) and puffed rice.

Their origin have descended from Kshatriya. But few greedy people want to take advantage of facility from the Gov. in the name of caste. and are forcefully degrading and merging themselves. In October 22, the High Court of Odisha rejected to include the caste, along with others like Radhi and Niary, in the Scheduled Caste list. A return has been filed by the State. In paragraph-3 of the counter affidavit it has been averred that: "............ It has been seen from the Record-of-Rights of the Tahasil that caste "Kaibarta" has been recorded against some individual tenants and Niari against some other individual tenants. So the Kaibarta and Niari are two completely different castes having different occupations. The caste Niari has not yet been included in the Orissa Scheduled Caste list. The clarification issued by the Government vide letter No. 25943/HTW dated 22-8-1989 from joint Director-cum-Deputy Secretary to Government, H. & T. W. Department Orissa, Bhubaneswar does not show that Niari is a sub- caste of caste Kaibarta as claimed by the petitioner. In forming a general opinion it is seen at this place that there are some persons belonging to different castes are also occupying the profession of "Chudakuta" and "Mudhibhaja" and also fishing with their own nets. But certainly they are not Kaibarta, Keuta or Dhibara. Therefore Niari cannot be treated as Dewar". So, the Niaris doesn't belong to keuta community. They are not included in SC/ST list.
