= Digambar Behera =

Indian physician

Digambar Behera (born 1953) is a doctor from Cuttack, Odisha, India. His specialization is in pulmonary diseases. In 2020, he received the Padma Shri honour from the Government of India for his contribution to the field of medicine.

== Education ==
Behera completed MBBS in 1978 from SCB Medical College and MD in 1981 from Postgraduate Institute of Medical Education and Research (PGI), Chandigarh.

== Career ==
In 1978, Behera joined the Department of Medicine at the PGI as a junior resident. He teaches the department of pulmonary medicine as a senior professor since 2000. He became the Head of the Department of Pulmonary Medicine in 2014 and the Dean of the Pulmonary Research Department in 2017 with two years extension from the Union Ministry.

In 2011, he became the director of PGI. He is the chairman of the National Tuberculosis Elimination Program and of some divisions under the Indian Tuberculosis Research Consortium.

He is a fellow of the American College of Chest Physicians, the National Academy of Medical Sciences, and the Asia Pacific Society of Respirology. He is on the editorial board of the Indian Journal of Chest Diseases and Allied Sciences and the Indian Journal of Tuberculosis. He is also the founding President of the Indian Study for the Study of Lung Cancer.

== Awards ==
- Padma Shri (2020)
- PRJ Gangadharam Award (2015)
- Kael Styblo Prize for Public Health (2009)
- BC Roy Award (2004)
