= Behera Sahi =

Beherasahi
- village
- Location in Orissa, India
- Coordinates: 21.8895°N 87.2399°E
- Country: India
- State: Odisha
- District: Balasore

Population (2011)
  - Total: 1,460

Languages
  - Official: Oriya
- Time zone: UTC+5:30 (IST)

Behera Sahi, also written Beherasahi, is a village located near Jaleswar, Balasore district on the bank of Subarnarekha River. It has a population of 1460 on account of the census 2011.

== List of Schools ==
- Behera Sahi primary school
- Bhaskar ch. M.E. school

== Religious Places ==
- Baba Ragadeswar Shiba temple
