= Behera =

- Town
- Location in Odisha, India
- Coordinates: 19°44′57″N 82°59′7″E
- Country: India
- State: Odisha
- District: Kalahandi

Government
  - Type: Local Self Government.
  - Body: Gram Panchayat

Population (2001)
  - Total: 5,800

Languages
  - Official: Odia
- Time zone: UTC+5:30 (IST)
- PIN: 766103
- Telephone code: 06672
- Vehicle registration: OD 08
- Sex ratio: 49:51 ♂/♀
- Land of Goddess Maa Danteswari

Behera ( /bɛˈhɛˈrɑː/); is a hill town and Gram Panchayat of Dharamgarh Tehsil. It is 20 km from Dharamgarh and 14 km from Athara-Nala forest. Behera Dam is situated nearby which is 18 km from the village. This small hill town is surrounded by forests and is situated nearly to a very well known tourist place Dokrichanchra of Kalahandi. Behera is 65 km distance from its District Main City Bhawanipatna, and 560 km distance from its State Capital Bhubaneswar.

== Demographics ==
As of the 2011 Census of India, Total Population of Behera was 6,948, where it constitutes 52% of male and 48% female. Behera had a total literacy population of 5,947, from which male literacy 90% and female literacy 60%. Total SC population of this town was 1526 and Total ST population was 2246. As per census 2011 it is estimated that the population of Behera is near about 6948.

== Written and spoken languages ==
The chief communicative language of the village is Sambalpuri Odia. English and Odia are used for official purpose.

== Education ==
=== Schools ===
- Govt.Danteswari High School, Behera
- Govt.U.P and M.E Nodal School
- Tandapara U.P School
- Saraswati Sishu Vidya Mandir
- Kasturaba Gandhi Abasika Balika Vidyalaya
- G.M Public School
- Govt Primary School Bankimunda, Behera
- Bharuamunda Primary School, Behera
- Primary School Gaintapada, Behera
- Centre Primary School, Nunpani, Behera
- Primary School (New) Pipalpada Behera

=== Colleges ===
- Lakhiram Agrawal College

== Hospitals nearby ==
- Primary Health Centre, Behera
- Office Of The Assistant Veterinary surgeon, Behera
- Homeopathy Hospital Behera
- Sub health centre Behera

== Temples ==
- Goddess Danteswari Temple
- Lord Shiva Temple
- Lord Jagannath Temple
- Sri Budharaja Temple
- Hanuman Temple
- Manpuriani Temple Behera
- Sarbajanina Durga Mandap.
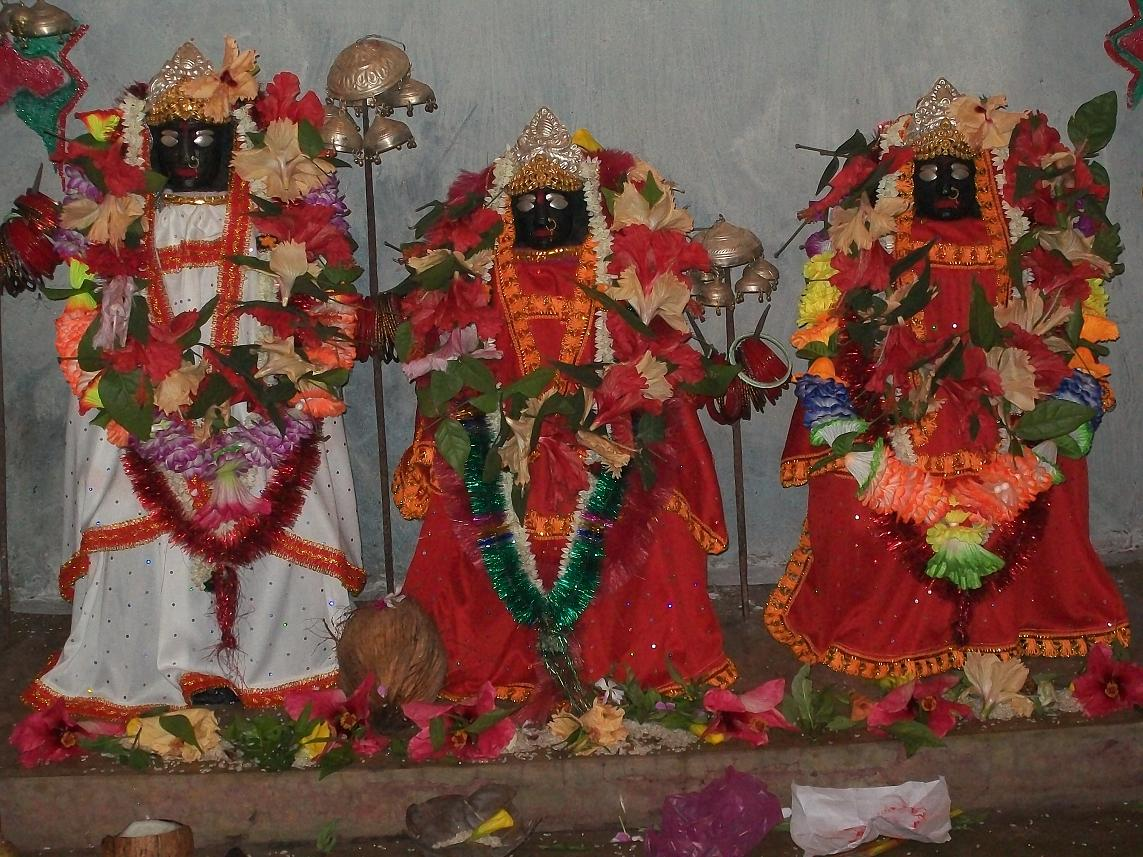
Maa Danteswari in middle

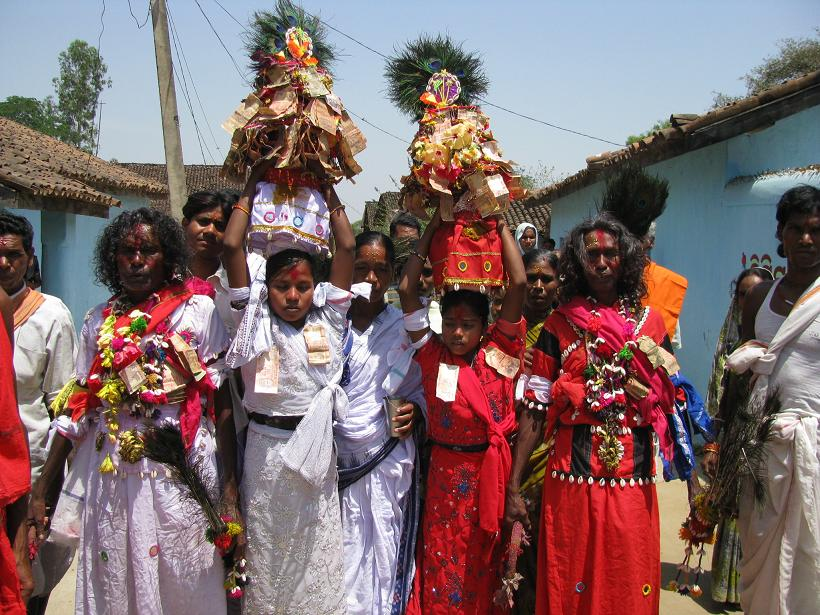
Maa Danteswari Ghant

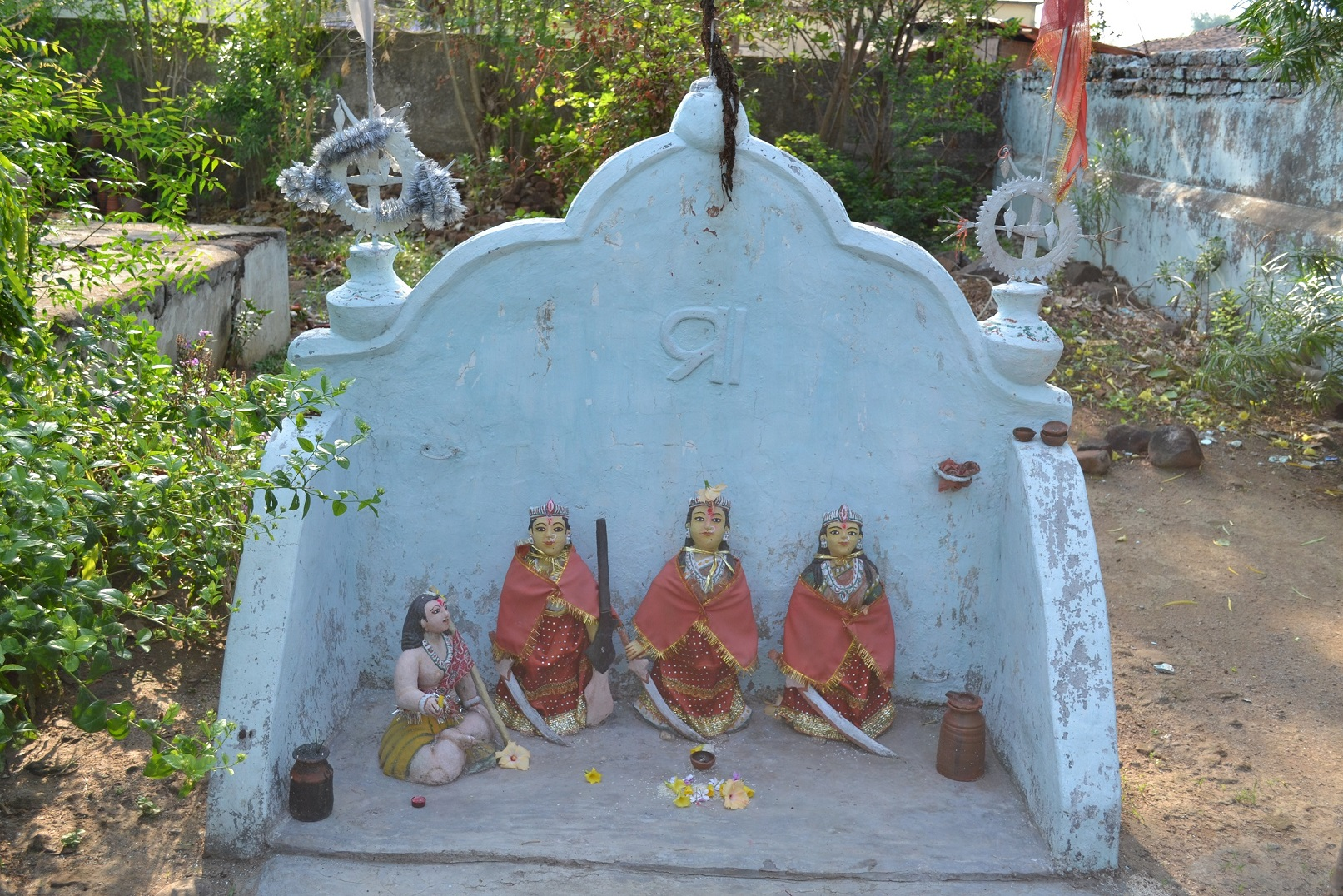
Inside The Temple

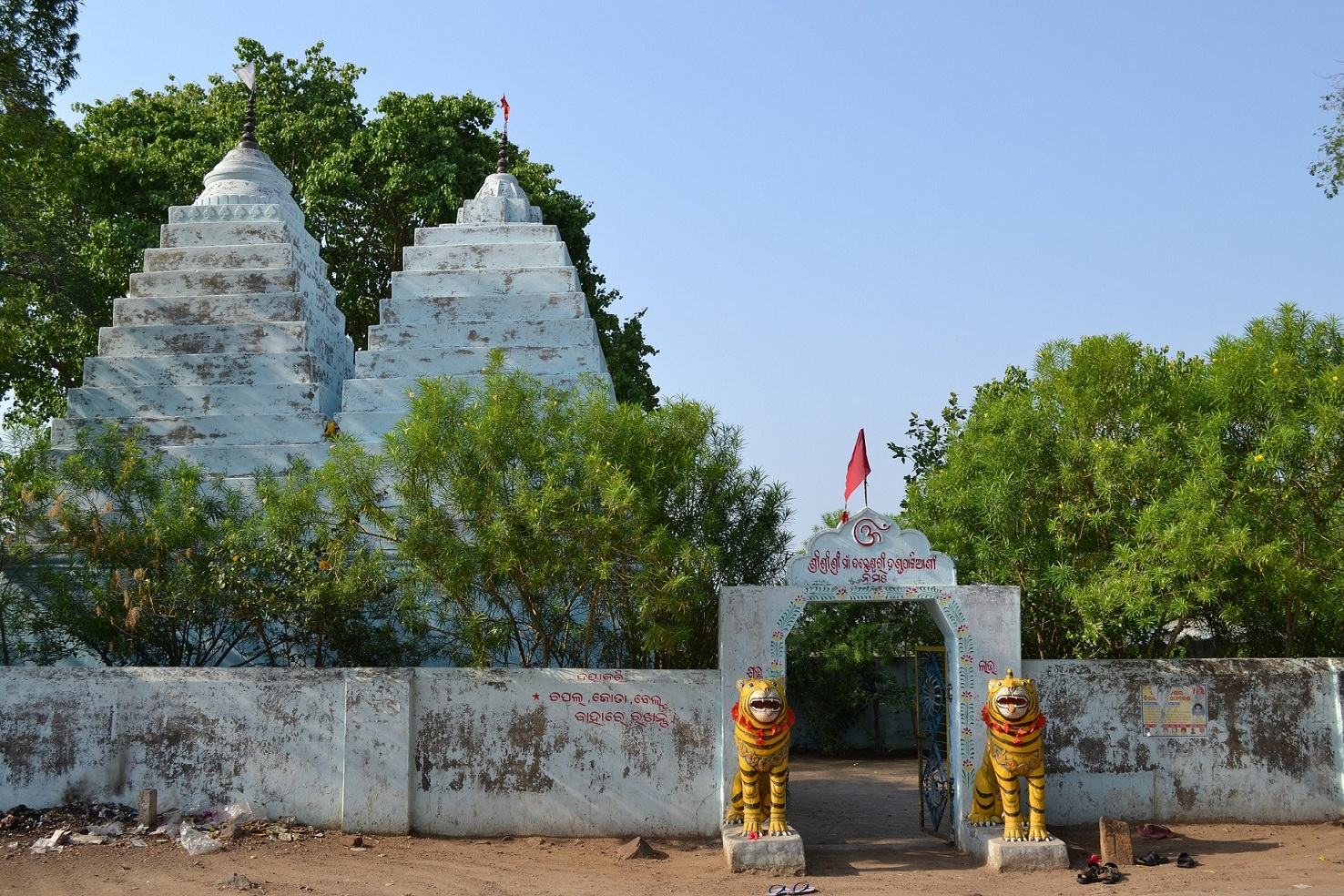
Temple Front

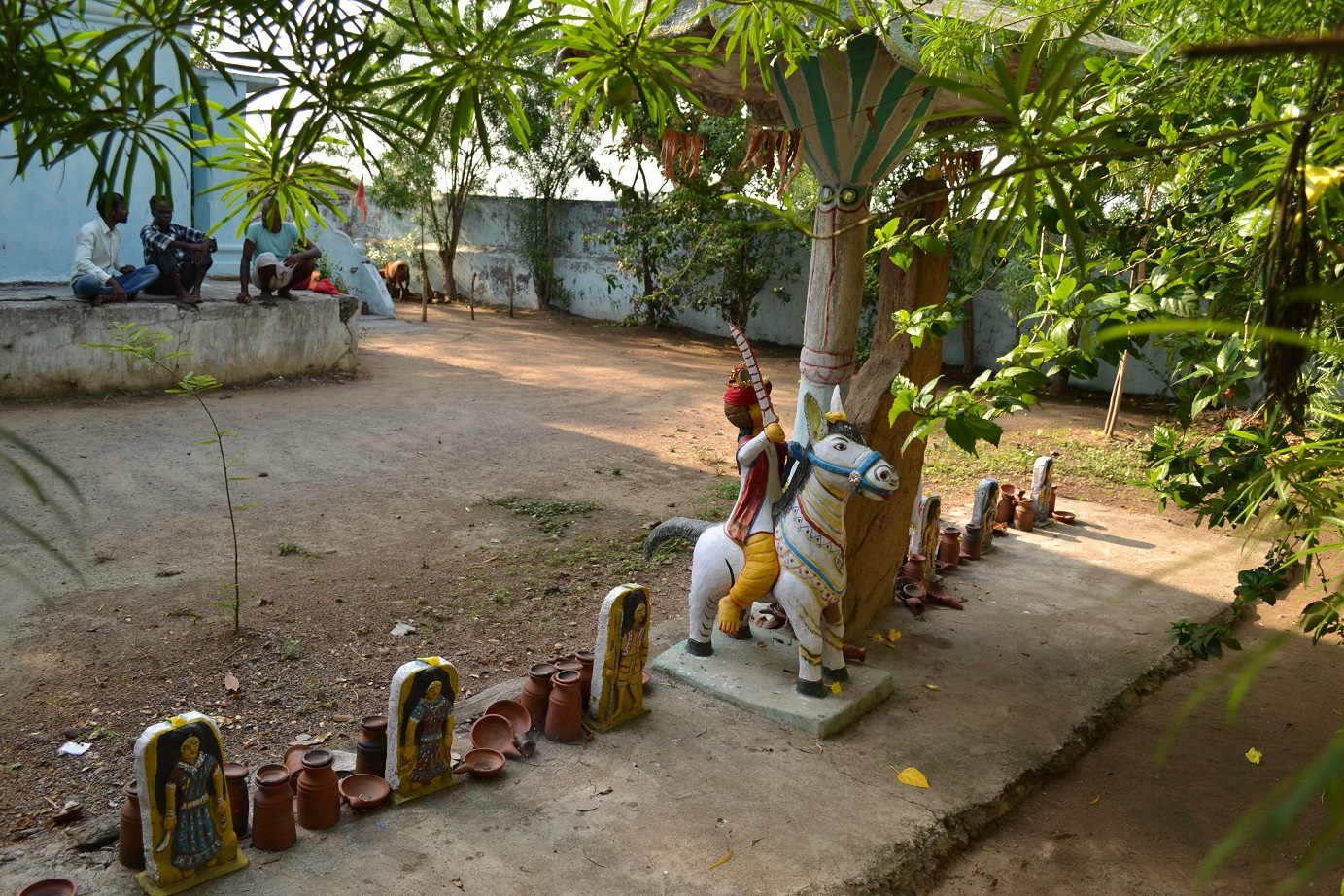
Inside The Temple

== Arts ==
- Ghumura
- Rahas
- Madal
- Sankirtan
- Banabadi

== Views ==
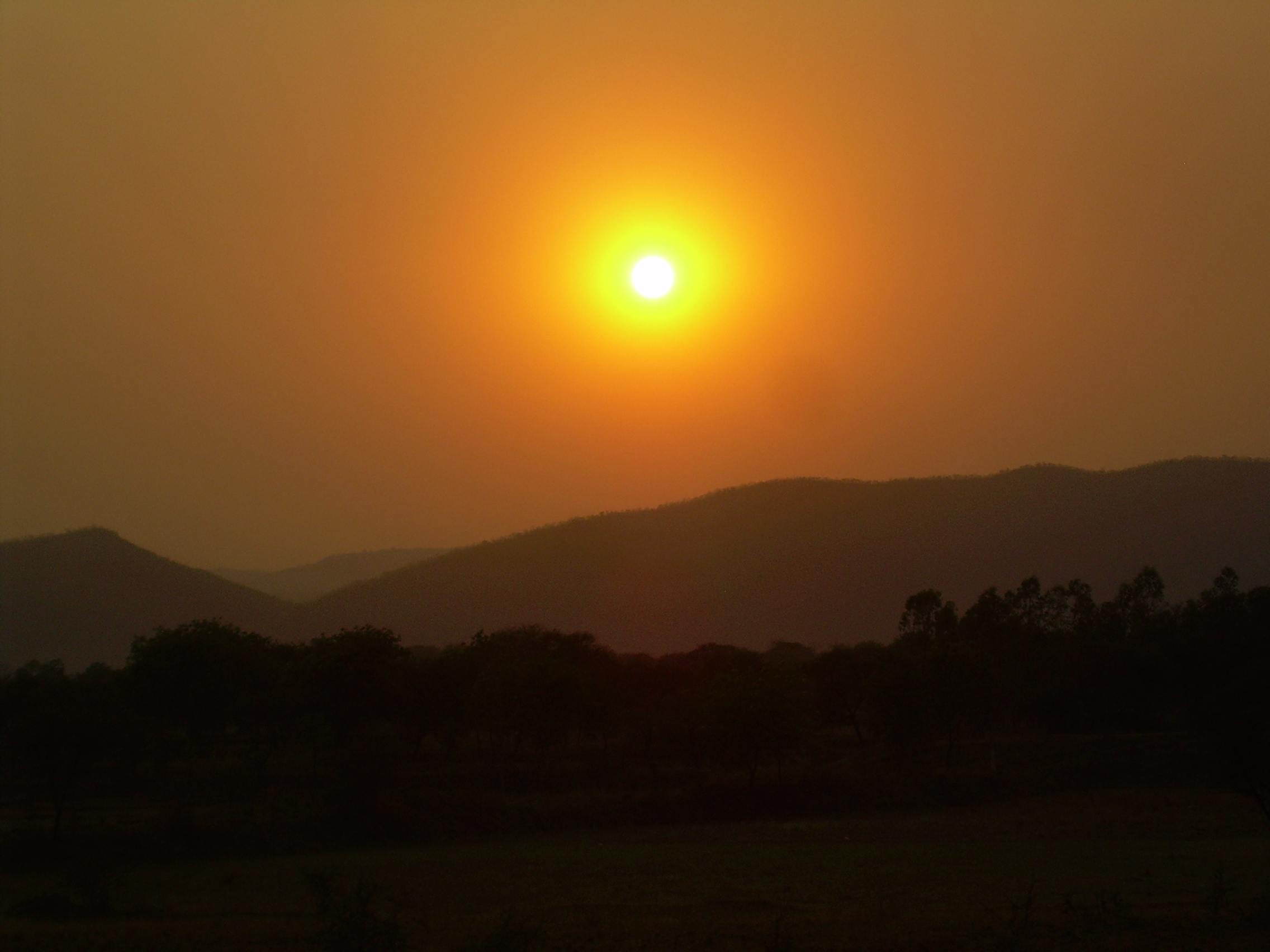

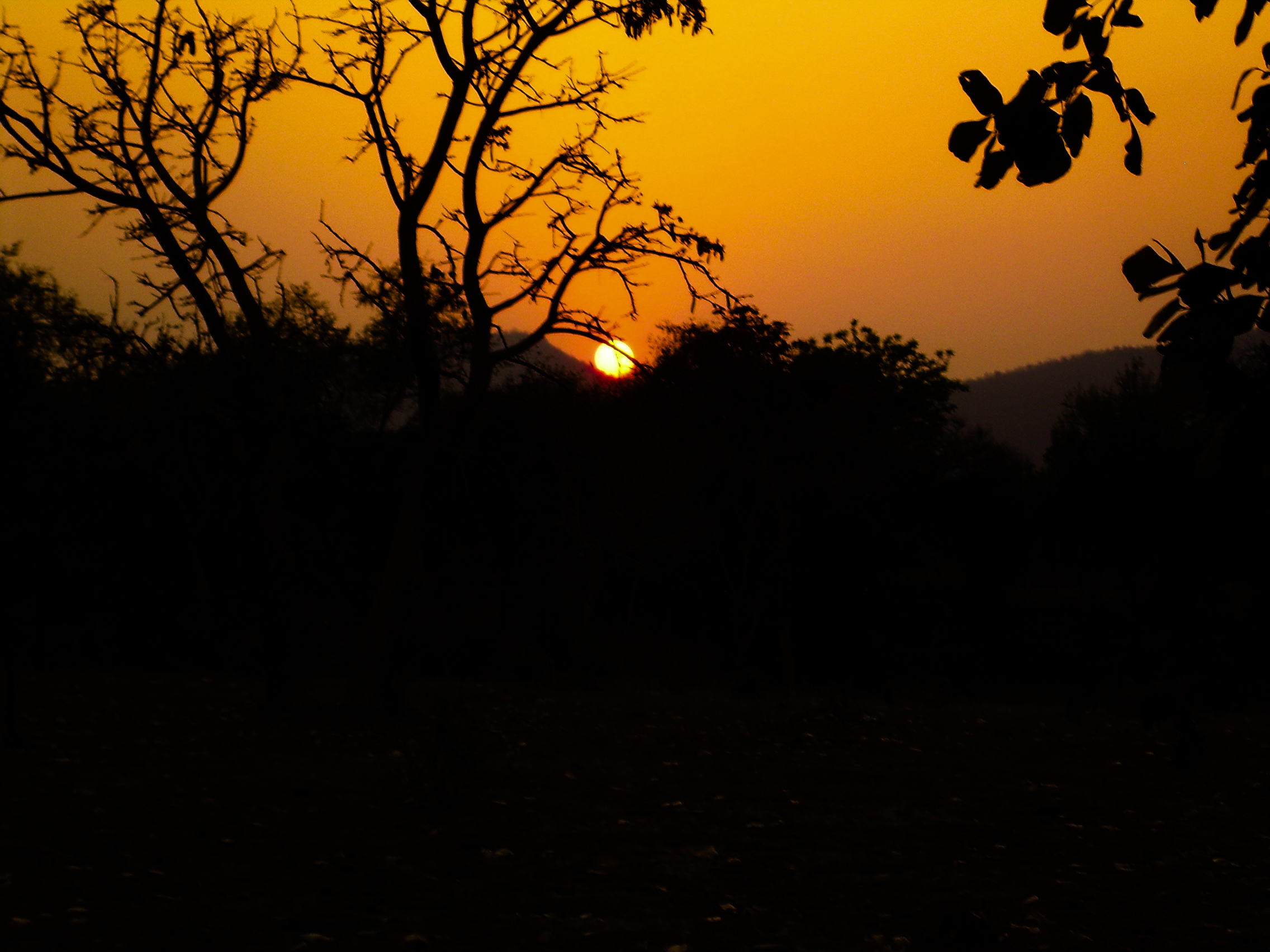

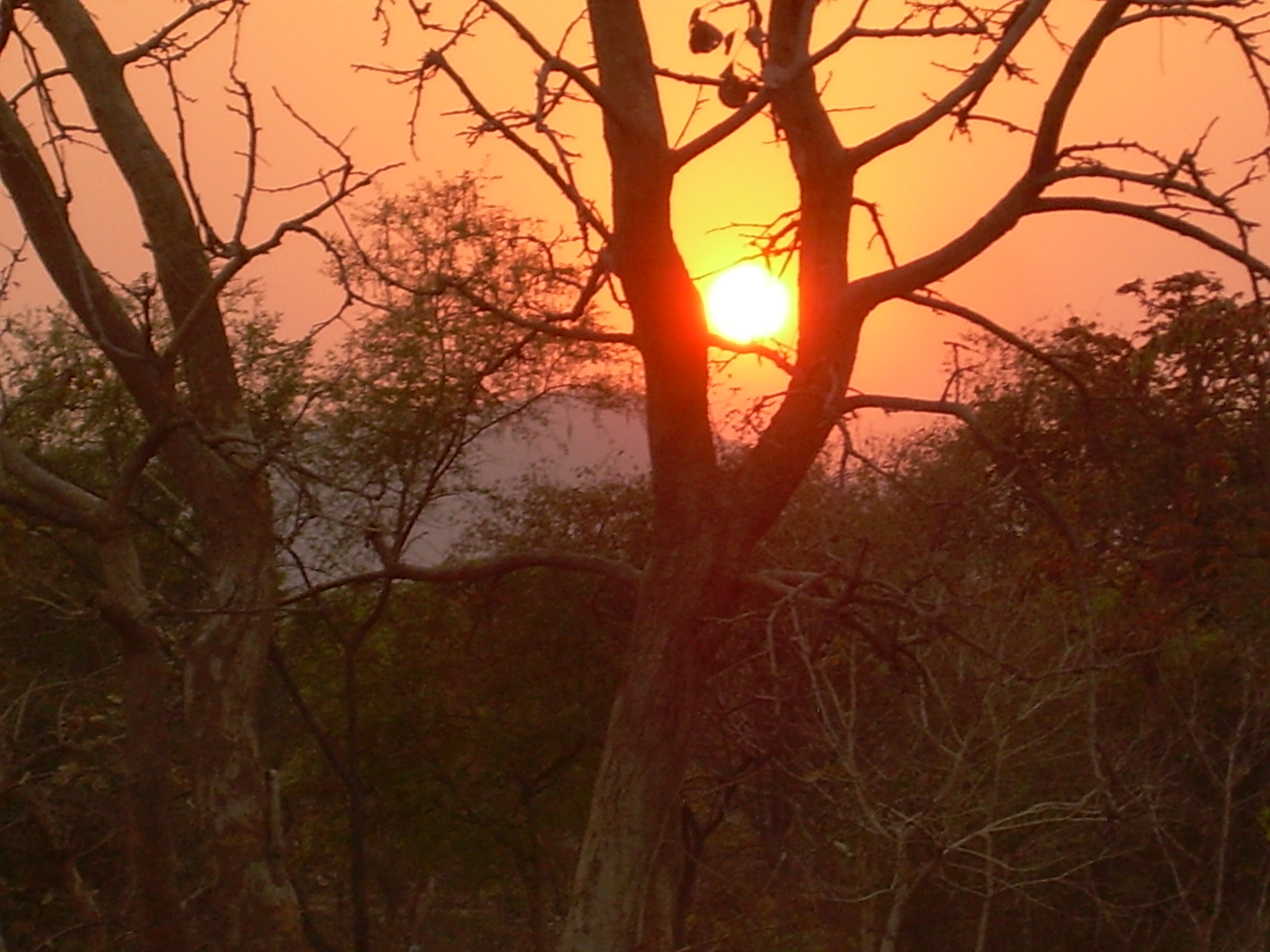

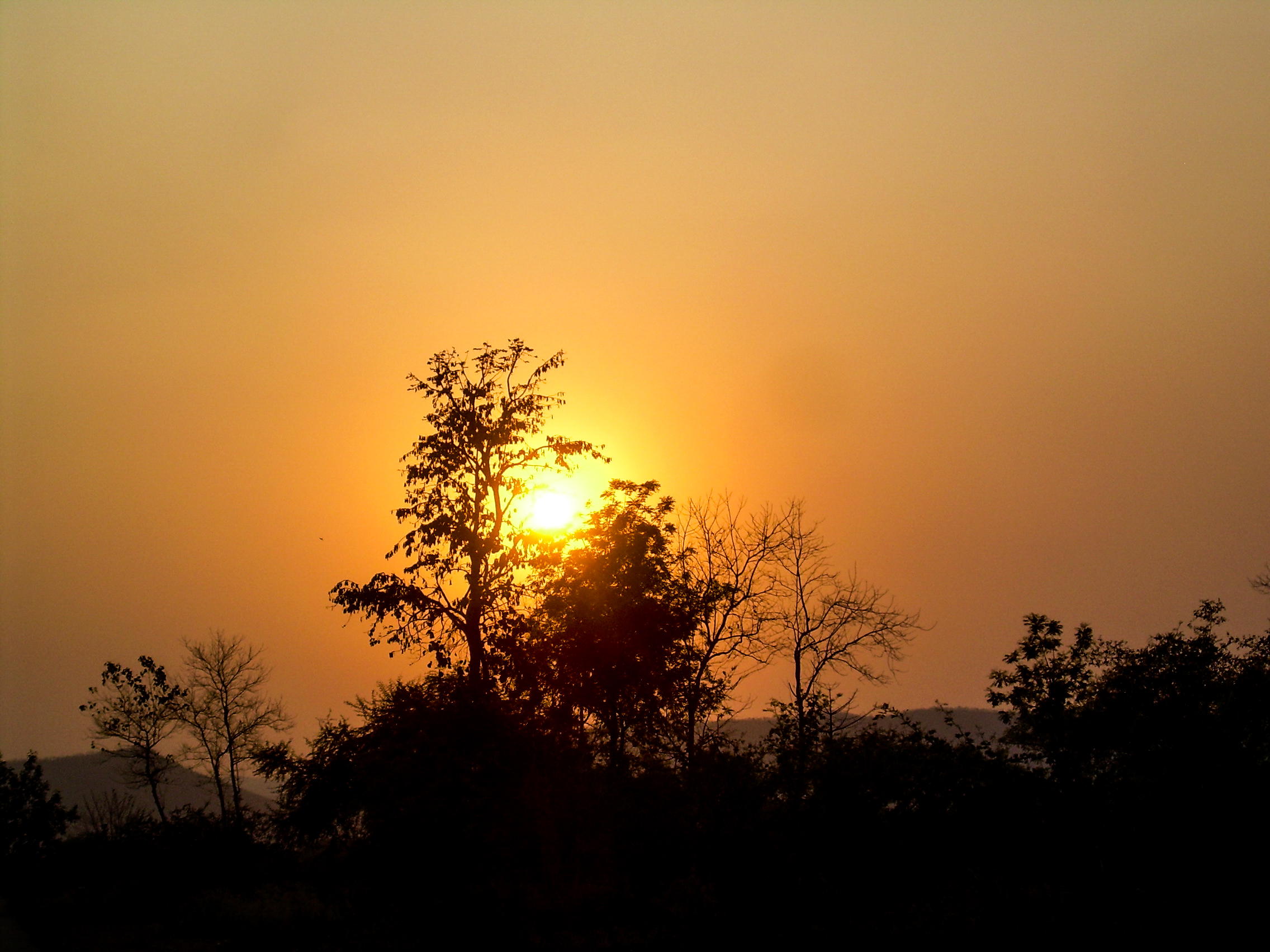

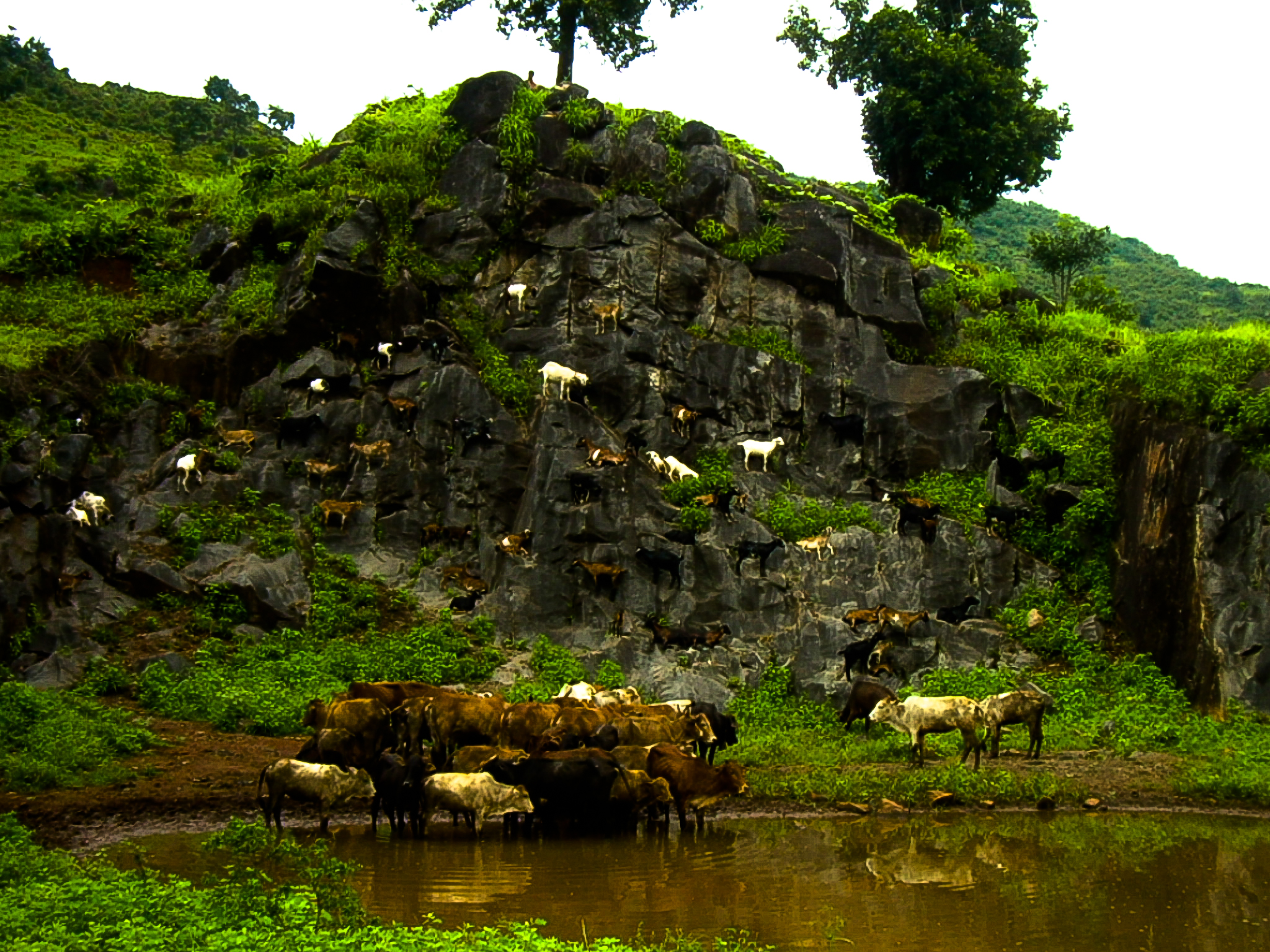

== Cultivation ==
Generally in Behera, many kinds of cereal and pulses are cultivated, mainly paddy and maize. It is a market place for surrounding small villages, and is also one of the main grain collection centers in Kalahandi District. Most people are dependent on agriculture as their source of income. Two rice mills are situated here to process the paddy. Rice is the main grain which is cultivated in this area. Nearly 2 lakh quintals of paddy and one lakh quintals of maize are collected and produced here. Chidanand Rice Mill is located in Behera. It has 3 sortex rice mills and 2 Plane rice mills. Panigrahi Farm House is located nearby Behera.

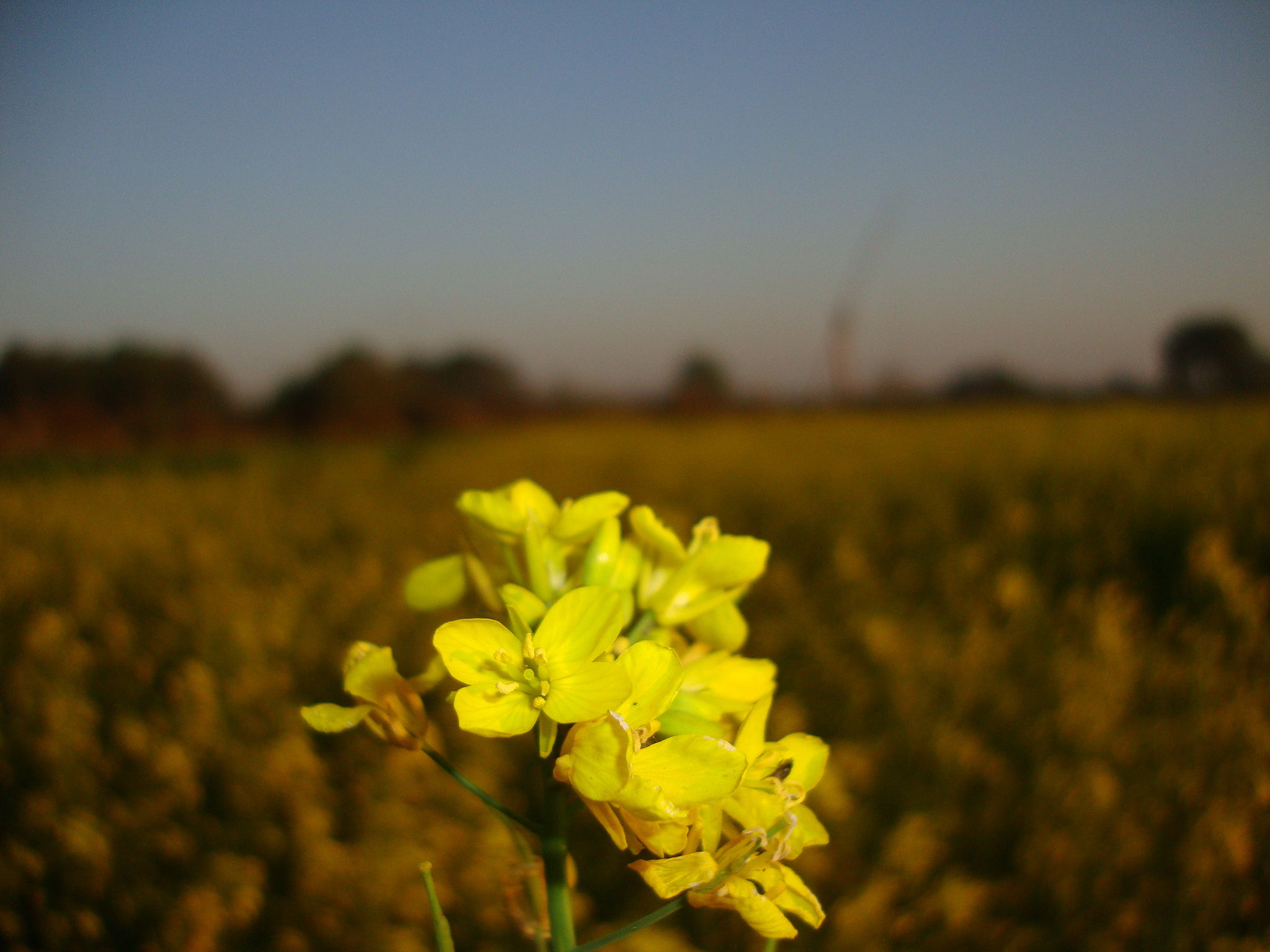

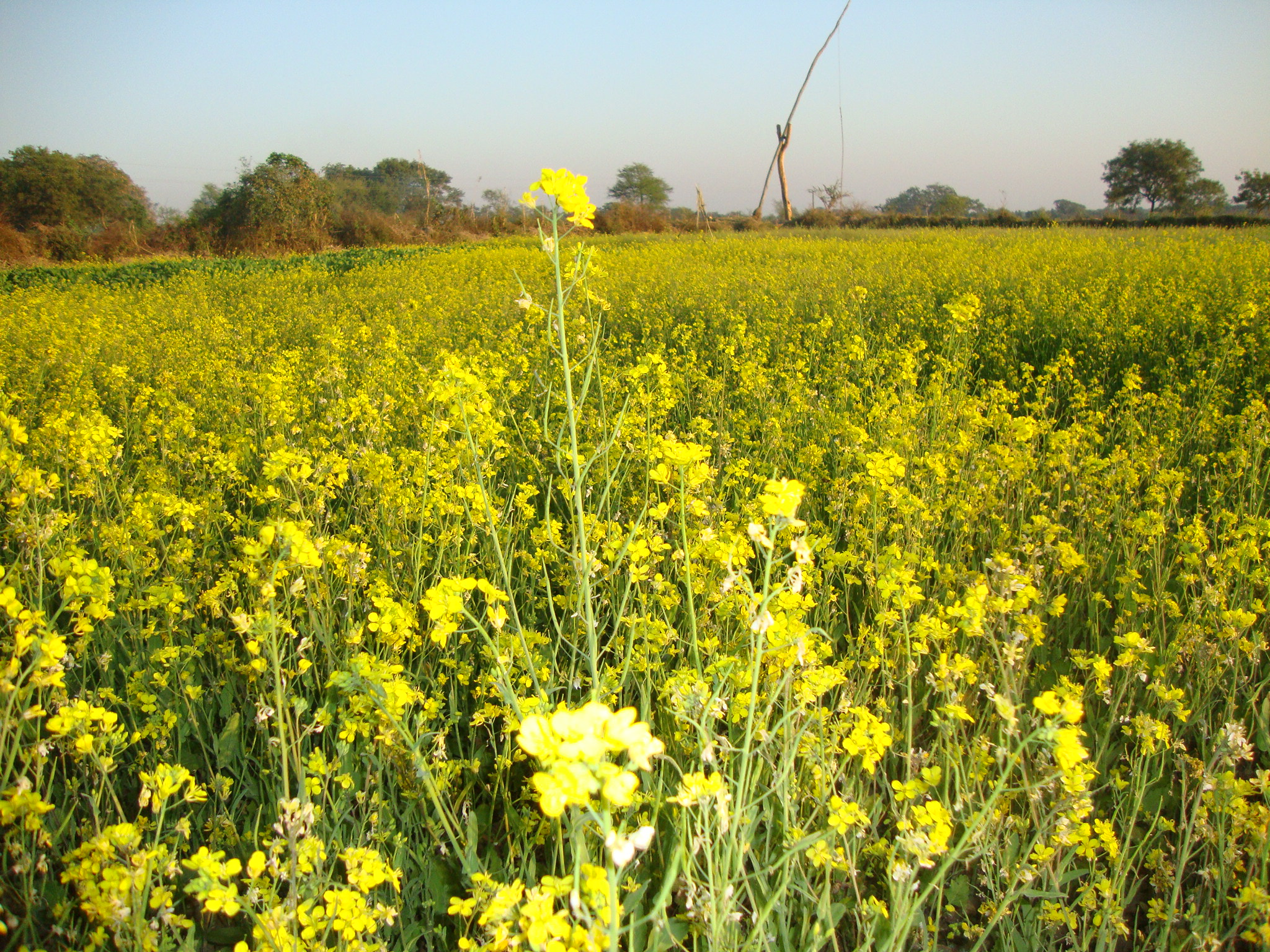

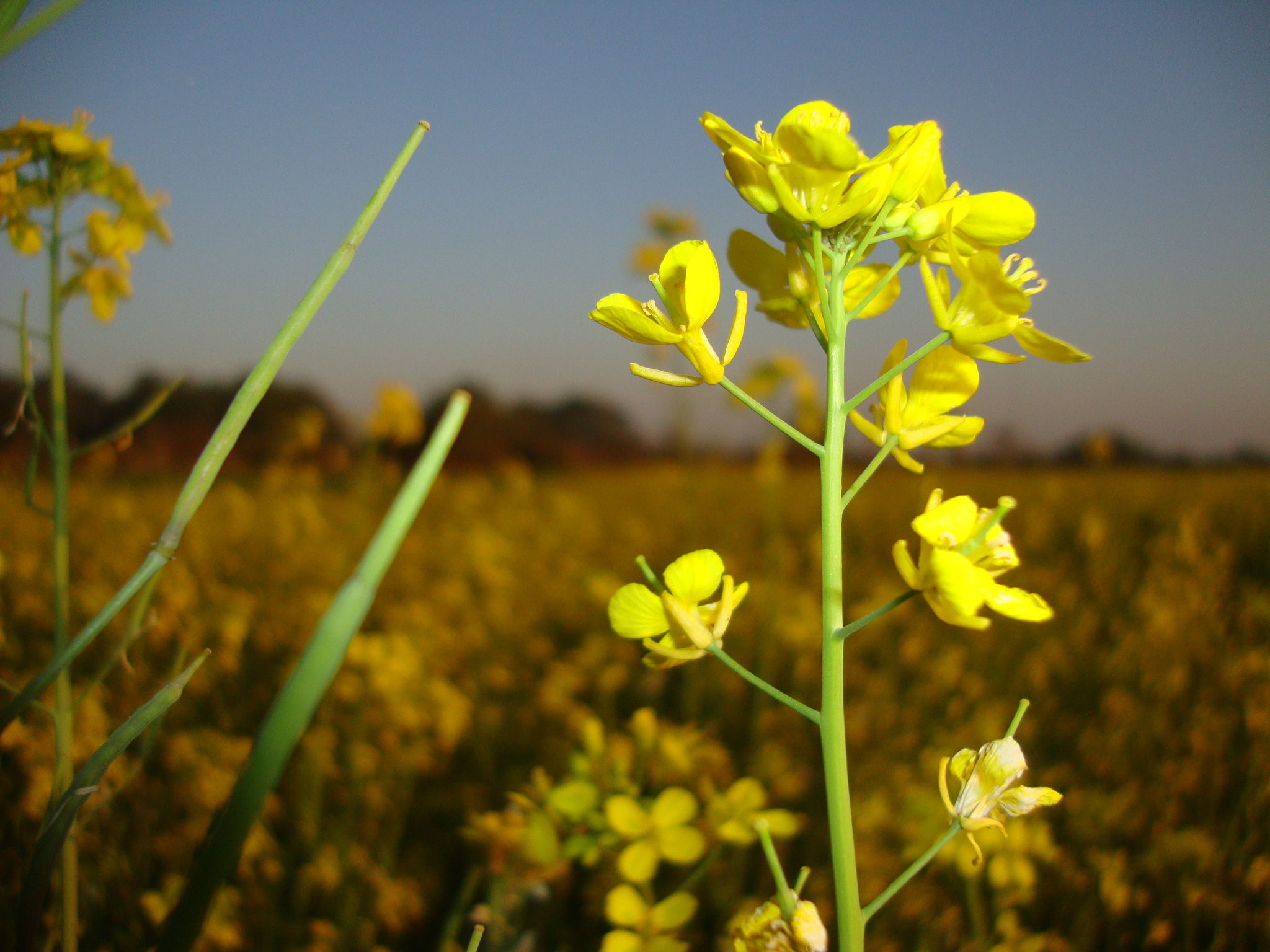

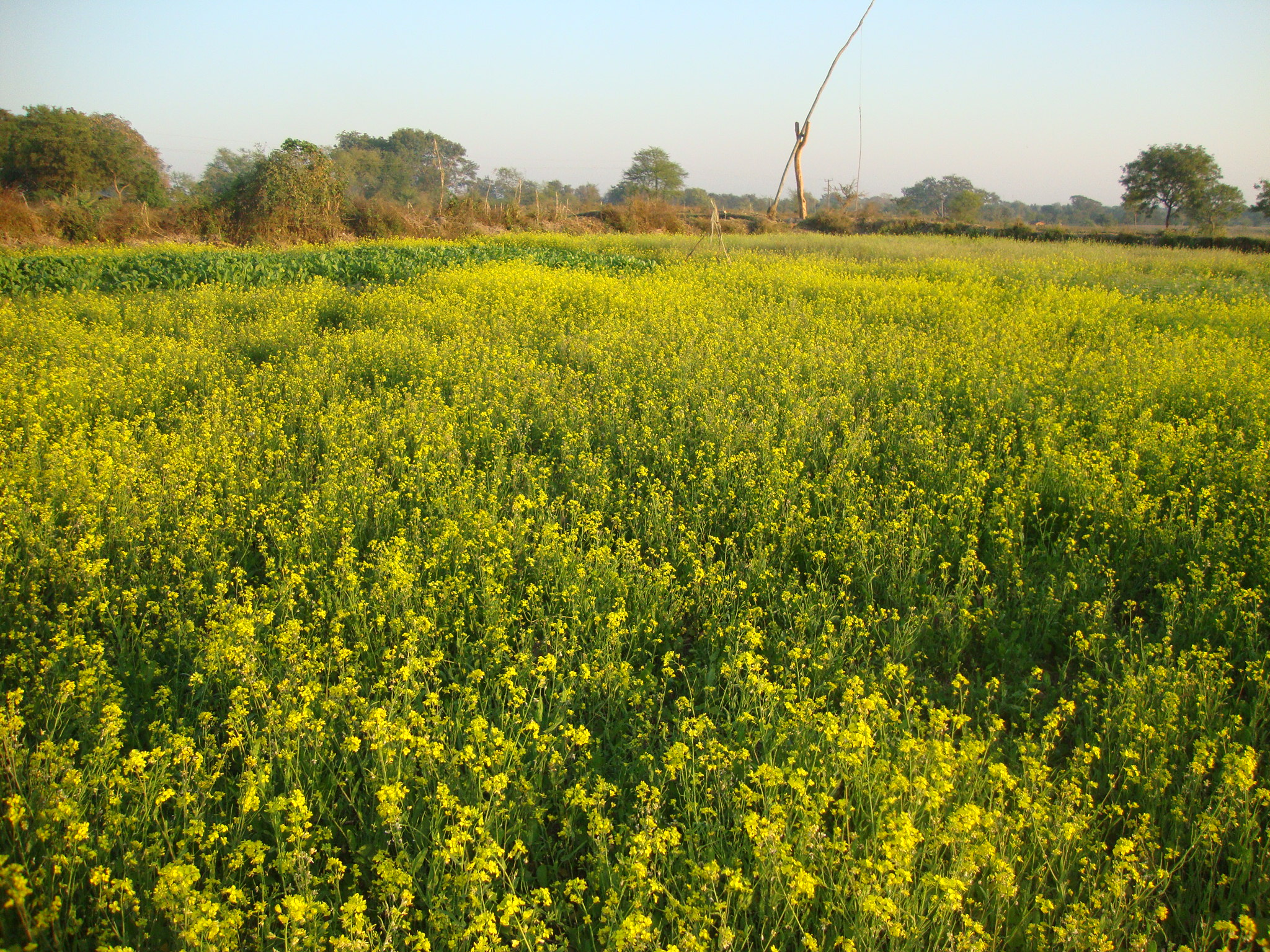

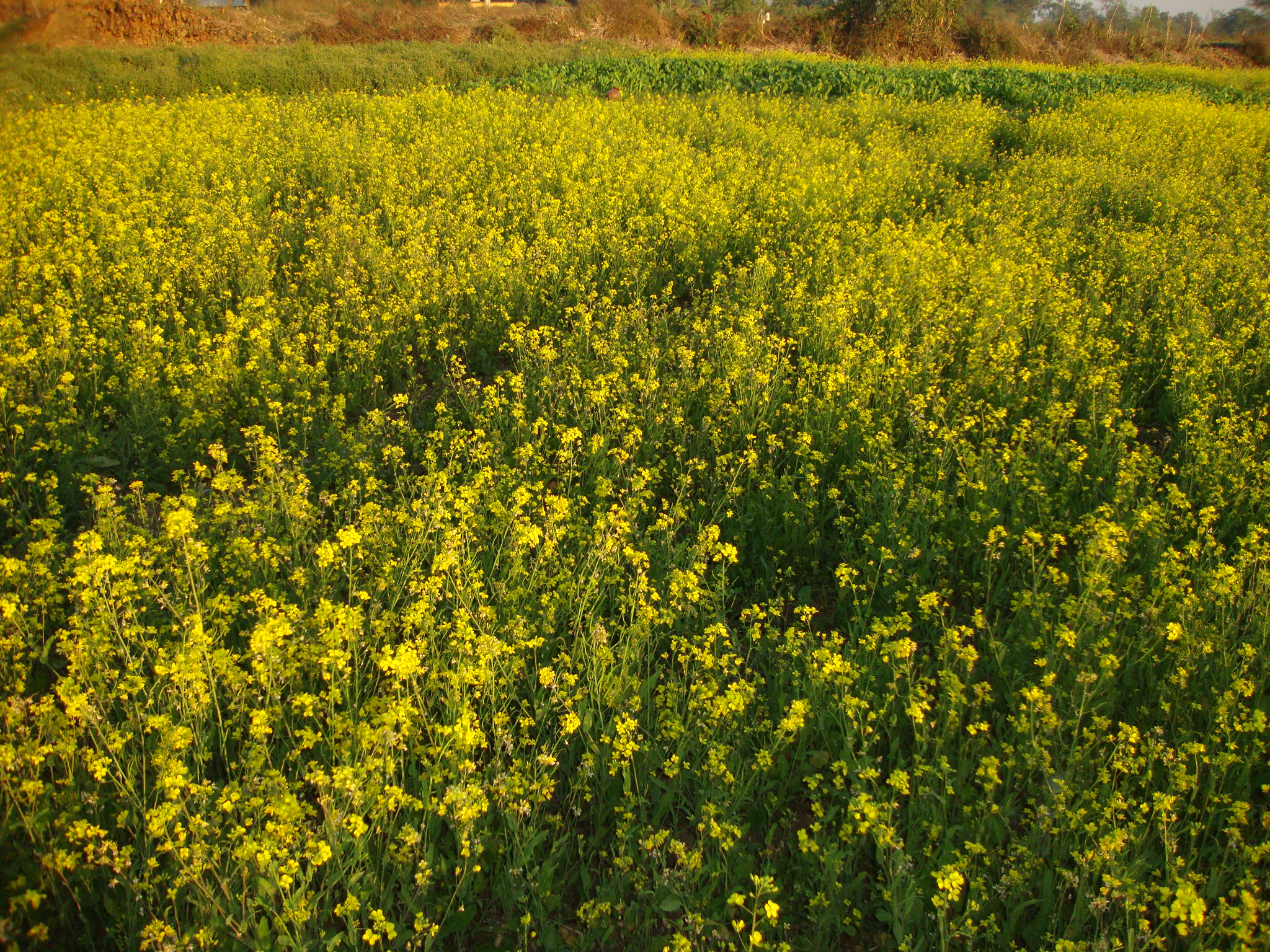
