= Mandakini Trivedi =

Indian dancer

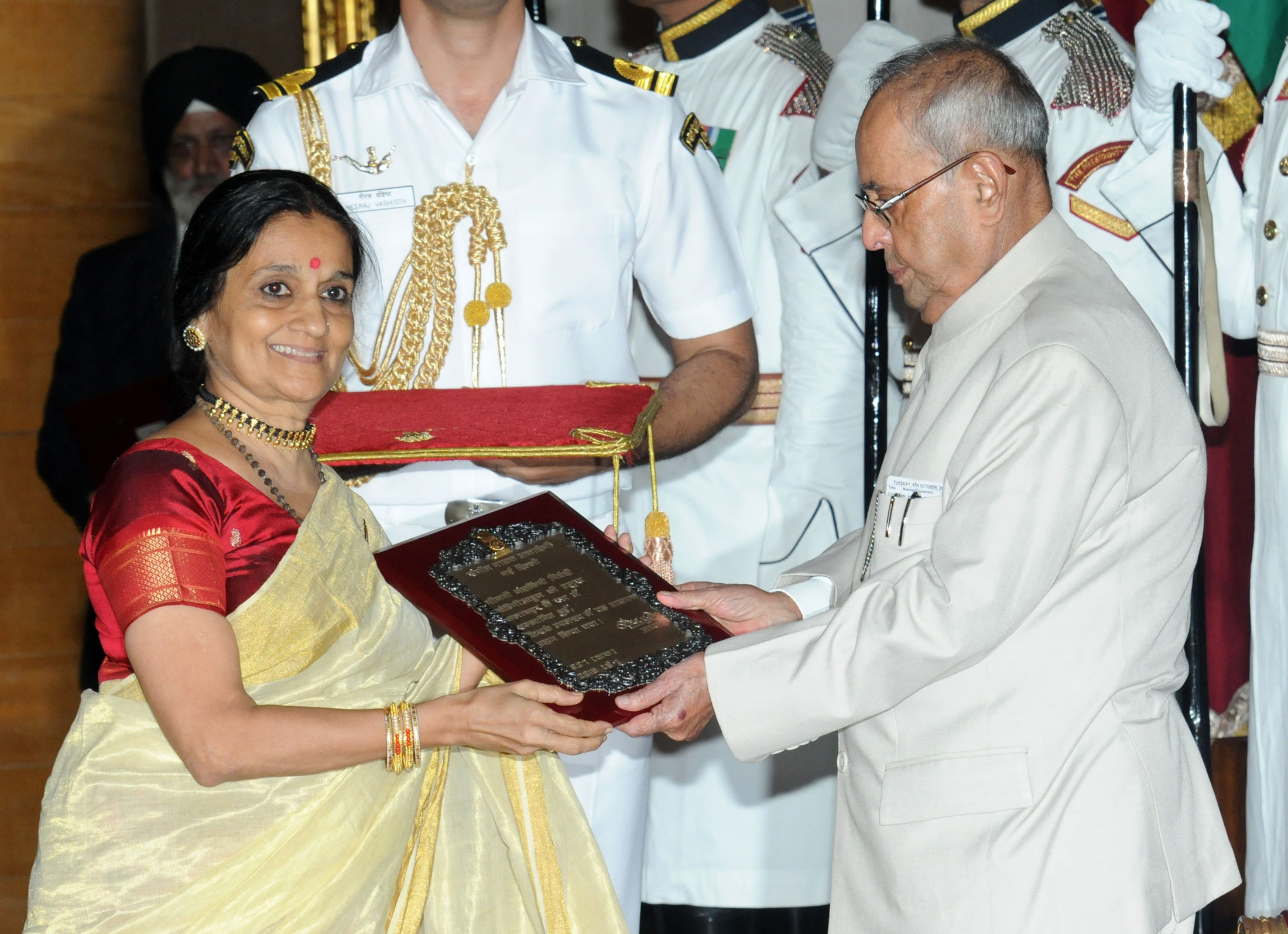
- Occupation: Dancer
- Awards: Sangeet Natak Akademi Award in 2015

Mandakini Trivedi is an Indian dancer. In 2015, she has been the Sangeet Natak Akademi Award for her contribution in Mohiniyattam classical dance.

== Early life and education ==
Trivedi did Masters in Fine Art in Dance from Nalanda Nrityakala Mahavidyalaya. She did her post-graduation in Bharatnatyam.

== Career ==
Trivedi was a professor of Indian Dance at Nalanda Nrityakala Mahavidyalaya for twelve years. She was also a curator of Kalan Ghoda Arts Festival in 2007 and 2008. She is trained in Mohiniattam.

== Awards ==
- Sangeet Natak Akademi Award in 2015
- Central Government Junior Fellowship
