= Mandakini Behera =

Indian politician

1st woman Member: Odisha Legislative Assembly
- In office July 2002 – February 2004
- Preceded by: Bhagabat Behera
- Succeeded by: Arun Kumar Sahu
- Constituency: Nayagarh

Personal details
- Born: Mandakini Das; 25 August 1947 (age 78) Nayagarh, Odisha, India
- Party: Biju Janata Dal
- Spouse: Bhagabat Behera
- Children: 4 daughters
- Parent: Alekh Chandra Das (father)
- Education: B.A., B.Ed.
- Profession: Politician, Social Worker

Mandakini Behera is a Politician in Odisha. She served as the Member of Legislative Assembly for Nayagarh for the years 2002–2004.

== Early life and education ==
Mandakini Behera was born to Alekh Chandra Das in Nayagarh district of Odisha and she graduated in B.A and B.Ed. She married a Yadav politician Bhagabat Behera.
