= Sachin & Babi =

Fashion-design house

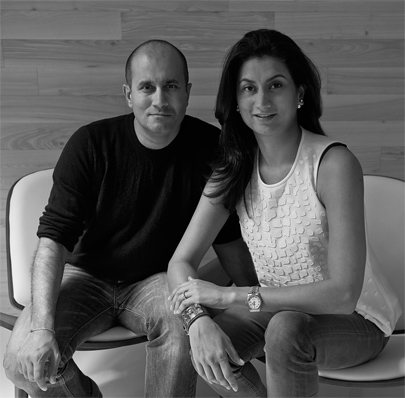
- Portrait of Sachin and Babi Ahluwalia
- Company type: Private company
- Industry: Fashion
- Founded: 2009
- Founder: Sachin and Babi Ahluwalia
- Headquarters: New York City, United States
- Area served: Worldwide
- Products: Apparel, jewelry
- Website: www.sachinandbabi.com

Sachin & Babi is a fashion-design house based in New York City and known for their unique embroideries. It was founded in 2009 by Indian-born husband and wife designers Sachin and Babi Ahluwalia. This contemporary womenswear line specialized in refined evening gowns and separates. Since 2009, the brand has been featured many times on fashion magazines and adopted by celebrities around the world.

== History ==
=== Founder ===
The brand Sachin & Babi is named after its founder and designer, Sachin Ahluwalia and Babi Ahluwalia. They are both from India and met as students at New York's Fashion Institute of Technology in 1994. Sachin studied fashion design while Babi studied textiles. They fell in love during school, and got engaged after graduation, then started the business together.

=== Evolution ===
Prior to establishing this women's ready-to-wear brand, Sachin and Babi Ahluwalia were working as embroidery craftsmen, creating authentic Indian threadwork. In 1997, they were introduced to Oscar de la Renta and got the chance to showcase some of their embroidery work. Oscar then decided to put Sachin and Babi's embroidery on his evening gowns. That was the beginning of their business, since then, they have been supplying embroideries for other top name brands.

In 2004, they launched a luxury home brand, Ankasa on New York Upper East Side, with a line of embroidered pillows and accessories.

As a result of the pandemic, in 2021, Sachin & Babi from 60% wholesale to 60% DTC e-commerce sales. They also began a new company, The Good Kloth Company, focusing on well-designed, well-manufactured uniforms coated with this antimicrobial coating using BioBloX. In collaboration with a Swiss chemical solutions company, they created a line for workers on the front lines and essential staff to wear that would by stylish and protective. Manufactured in Vietnam, the Good Kloth Company makes uniforms for aviation and restaurant workers, reusable scrubs, masks, PPE gear, and headgear for medical workers.

=== Eponymous Collection ===
In 2009, the designer duo went back to the fashion industry and created their eponymous womenswear collection, Sachin & Babi. It provides elegant and luxury design styles with more affordable price. The label In the bridal fashion week of 2016, Sachin & Babi made their first move in the bridal dresses. They introduced the 12-piece wedding dress collection for Spring 2017.

In 2020, Sachin & Babi expanded their all-gown label to cocktail dresses and daywear attires.
