= List of W cover models =

This list of W cover models (1990–present) is a catalog of cover models who have appeared on the cover of the American fashion magazine W.

== 1990s ==
=== 1990 ===
Issue	Cover model	Photographer
8–15 January		
19–26 March		
17–24 September	Cindy Crawford	
12–19 November		
24 December	Naomi Campbell	Francesco Scavullo

=== 1991 ===
Issue	Cover model	Photographer
1 March	Jean Paul Gaultier	Art Streiber
15–22 April	Heather Stewart-Whyte	Don Ashby
19–26 August	Claudia Schiffer	Jamie Lavalley
September	Helena Christensen	David Turner
16–23 September	Cindy Crawford	J.R. Duran
30 September–7 October	Linda Evangelista	Eammon J. McCabe
11–18 November	Claudia Schiffer	Wade Watson

=== 1992 ===
Issue	Cover model	Photographer
6–13 January	Naomi Campbell	Patrik Andersson
15–22 February	Amber Valletta	Dewey Nicks
2–9 March	Elaine Irwin	Eammon J. McCabe
13–20 April	Annette Bening	Matthew Rolston
27 April–4 May	Nicole Kidman	Mark Abrahams
20 July		
17–24 August	Christy Turlington	Art Streiber
28 September–5 October	Linda Evangelista	Walter Chin
9–16 November	Kate Moss	Patrik Andersson
21–28 December		Tim-Bret Day

=== 1993 ===
Issue	Cover model	Photographer
1–8 February	Kristen McMenamy	Michael Biondo
10–17 May	Kate Moss	Patrik Andersson
August	Nadège du Bospertus & Claudia Mason	Dewey Nicks
September	Kate Moss	Michael Thompson
October	Karen Mulder	J.R. Duran
November	Cecilia Chancellor	Perry Ogden
December	Michael McCraine	Raymond Meier

=== 1994 ===
Issue	Cover model	Photographer
January	Cecilia Chancellor	Raymond Meier
February	Linda Evangelista	Michael Thompson
March	Kate Moss	Kim Knott
April	Bridget Hall	Martin Brading
May	Stephanie Seymour	Wayne Maser
June	Amber Valletta	Craig McDean
July	Phoebe O'Brien	Marc Hom
August	Claudia Schiffer	Michael Thompson
September	Helena Christensen	Miles Aldridge
October	Bridget Hall	Robert Erdmann
November	Kirsty Hume	Miles Aldridge
December	Karen Mulder	

=== 1995 ===
Issue	Cover model	Photographer
January	Christy Turlington	Michael Thompson
February	Kate Moss	Miles Aldridge
March	Niki Taylor	Miles Aldridge
April	Nadja Auermann	Craig McDean
May	Kate Moss	Craig McDean
June	Linda Evangelista	Miles Aldridge
July	Nadja Auermann	Miles Aldridge
August	Shalom Harlow	Miles Aldridge
September	Kate Moss & Nick Moss	Mario Testino
October	Claudia Schiffer	Miles Aldridge
November	Amber Valletta	Miles Aldridge
December	Stella Tennant & Kate Moss	Mario Testino

=== 1996 ===
Issue	Cover model	Photographer
January	Christy Turlington	Michael Thompson
February	Shalom Harlow	Miles Aldridge
March	Guinevere Van Seenus & Amy Wesson	Mario Testino
April	Demi Moore	Matthew Rolston
May	Kate Moss	Nathaniel Goldberg
June	Guinevere Van Seenus	Michael Thompson
July	Kate Moss	Michael Thompson
August	Carolyn Murphy	Michael Thompson
September	Shalom Harlow	Michael Thompson
October	Stella Tennant	Michael Thompson
November	Tasha Tilberg & Sharon van der Knaap	Michael Thompson
December	Kate Moss	Michael Thompson

=== 1997 ===
Issue	Cover model	Photographer
January	Tom Cruise	Michael Thompson
February	Linda Evangelista	Michael Thompson
March	Shalom Harlow	Mario Testino
April	Amber Valletta	Michael Thompson
May	Christy Turlington	Michael Thompson
June	Kate Moss	Michael Thompson
July	Christy Turlington	Michael Thompson
August	Shalom Harlow	Michael Thompson
September	Carolyn Murphy	Michael Thompson
October	Angela Lindvall	Craig McDean
November	Stella Tennant	Michael Thompson
December	Angela Lindvall	Michael Thompson

=== 1998 ===
Issue	Cover model	Photographer
January	Shalom Harlow	Michael Thompson
February	Christy Turlington	Michael Thompson
March	Kate Moss	Michael Thompson
April	Amber Valletta	Michael Thompson
May	Milla Jovovich	Michael Thompson
June	Claudia Schiffer	Michael Thompson
July	Liv Tyler	Michael Thompson
August	Stephanie Seymour	Michael Thompson
September	Christy Turlington	Michael Thompson
October	Carolyn Murphy	Michael Thompson
November	Angela Lindvall	Michael Thompson
December	Gwyneth Paltrow	Michael Thompson

=== 1999 ===
Issue	Cover model	Photographer
January	Gisele Bündchen	Michael Thompson
February	Michelle Pfeiffer	Michael Thompson
March	Kate Moss	Michael Thompson
April	Christy Turlington	Michael Thompson
May	Gisele Bündchen	Michael Thompson
June	Cindy Crawford	Michael Thompson
July	Brad Pitt	Steven Klein
August	Bridget Hall	Michael Thompson
September	Kate Moss	Michael Thompson
October	Kristin Scott Thomas	Michael Thompson
November	Jennifer Aniston	Michael Thompson
December	Jodie Foster	Michael Thompson

== 2000s ==
=== 2000 ===
Issue	Cover model	Photographer
January	Gisele Bündchen	Michael Thompson
February	Gisele Bündchen	Michael Thompson
March	Christy Turlington	Michael Thompson
April	Calista Flockhart	Michael Thompson
May	Claudia Schiffer	Michael Thompson
June	Cindy Crawford	Michael Thompson
July	Amber Valletta	Craig McDean
August	Jennifer Lopez	Michael Thompson
September	Kate Moss	Michael Thompson
October	Stephanie Seymour	Michael Thompson
November	Meg Ryan	Michael Thompson
December	Hilary Swank	Michael Thompson

=== 2001 ===
Issue	Cover model	Photographer
January	Cate Blanchett	Michael Thompson
February	Tasha Tilberg	Craig McDean
March	Gisele Bündchen	Michael Thompson
April	Kate Moss	Craig McDean
May	Amber Valletta	Craig McDean
June	Karolína Kurková	Michael Thompson
July	Christy Turlington	Michael Thompson
August	Gisele Bündchen	Michael Thompson
September	Gwyneth Paltrow	Michael Thompson
October	Gisele Bündchen	Michael Thompson
November	Liv Tyler	Michael Thompson
December	Renée Zellweger	Michael Thompson

=== 2002 ===
Issue	Cover model	Photographer
January	Carolyn Murphy	Michael Thompson
February	Gisele Bündchen	Michael Thompson
March	Julia Roberts	Michael Thompson
April	Hugh Grant & Lauren Bush	Michael Thompson
May	Beyoncé	Michael Thompson
June	Winona Ryder	Michael Thompson
July	Tom Cruise	Michael Thompson
August	Shalom Harlow, Natalia Vodianova, Naomi Campbell, Kate Moss, Cindy Crawford, Patti Hansen, Gisele Bündchen, Christy Turlington, Iman, Claudia Schiffer, & Stephanie Seymour	Michael Thompson
September	Reese Witherspoon	Michael Thompson
October	Natalia Vodianova	Mario Testino
November	Travis Fimmel & Gisele Bündchen	Michael Thompson
December	Julianne Moore	Michael Thompson

=== 2003 ===
Issue	Cover model	Photographer
January	Selma Blair	Michael Thompson
February	Jennifer Aniston	Michael Thompson
March	Gisele Bündchen	Inez & Vinoodh
April	Madonna	Steven Klein
May	Pamela Anderson	Bruce Weber
June	Sarah Jessica Parker	Michael Thompson
July	Kate Hudson	Michael Thompson
August	Britney Spears	Michael Thompson
September	Kate Moss	Bruce Weber; Craig McDean; David Sims; Inez & Vinoodh; Juergen Teller; Mario Sorrenti; Mert & Marcus; Michael Thompson; Steven Klein
October	Jennifer Lopez	Michael Thompson
November	Jennifer Garner	Michael Thompson
December	Nicole Kidman	Inez & Vinoodh

=== 2004 ===
Issue	Cover model	Photographer
January	Gisele Bündchen	Michael Thompson
February	Cameron Diaz	Michael Thompson
March	Naomi Watts	Michael Thompson
April	Gemma Ward	Paolo Roversi
May	Uma Thurman	Michael Thompson
June	Gwyneth Paltrow	Michael Thompson
July	Catherine Zeta-Jones	Michael Thompson
August	Scarlett Johansson	Craig McDean
September	Julianne Moore	Michael Thompson
October	Élise Crombez	Steven Meisel
November	Natalia Vodianova	Michael Thompson
December	Daria Werbowy	Michael Thompson

=== 2005 ===
Issue	Cover model	Photographer
January	Julia Roberts	Michael Thompson
February	Renée Zellweger	Michael Thompson
March	Kate Moss	Mert & Marcus
April	Lindsay Lohan	Michael Thompson
May	Natalie Portman	Mert & Marcus
June	Gisele Bündchen	Michael Thompson
July	Angelina Jolie & Brad Pitt	Steven Klein
August	Katie Holmes	Michael Thompson
September	Kirsten Dunst	Mert & Marcus
October	Kate Hudson	Michael Thompson
November	Kate Moss	Mario Sorrenti
December	Karen Elson	Michael Thompson

=== 2006 ===
Issue	Cover model	Photographer
January	Mary-Kate Olsen	David Sims
February	Reese Witherspoon	Michael Thompson
March	Kate Moss	Craig McDean
April	Jessica Simpson	Michael Thompson
May	Meryl Streep & Lindsay Lohan	Michael Thompson
June	Madonna	Steven Klein
July	Kate Bosworth	Michael Thompson
August	Natalia Vodianova	Mert & Marcus
September	Christina Ricci	Mert & Marcus
October	Janet Jackson	Michael Thompson
November	Freja Beha Erichsen	Mario Sorrenti & Richard Tuttle
December	Cameron Diaz	Mert & Marcus

=== 2007 ===
Issue	Cover model	Photographer
January	Sienna Miller	Craig McDean
February	Daniel Craig & Nicole Kidman	David Sims
March	Ellen DeGeneres	Michael Thompson
April	Kirsten Dunst	Craig McDean
May	America Ferrera	Michael Thompson
June	Naomi Campbell	Steven Klein
July	Gisele Bündchen	Michael Thompson
August	David Beckham & Victoria Beckham	Steven Klein
September	Gwyneth Paltrow	Steven Klein
October	Cate Blanchett	Michael Thompson
November	Angelina Jolie, Britney Spears, Cameron Diaz, Jennifer Aniston, Jessica Simpson, Julia Roberts, Katie Holmes, Lindsay Lohan, Madonna, Nicole Kidman	Richard Prince
December	Renée Zellweger & George Clooney	Michael Thompson

=== 2008 ===
sIssue	Cover model	Photographer
January	Hilary Swank	Steven Klein
February	Keira Knightley & James McAvoy	Steven Klein
March	Scarlett Johansson & Natalie Portman	Steven Klein
April	Kate Moss	Mert & Marcus
May	Cameron Diaz	Michael Thompson
June	Charlize Theron	Craig McDean
July	Daria Werbowy; Kate Moss; Lara Stone	Bruce Weber
August	Penélope Cruz	Mert & Marcus
September	Kate Hudson	Mert & Marcus
October	Anne Hathaway	Mario Sorrenti
November	Angelina Jolie	Brad Pitt
December	Blake Lively	Inez & Vinoodh

=== 2009 ===
Issue	Cover model	Photographer
January	Christy Turlington	Mario Sorrenti
February	Brad Pitt	Chuck Close
March	Madonna	Steven Klein
April	Drew Barrymore	Mert & Marcus
May	Amy Adams	Craig McDean
June	Ginnifer Goodwin	Steven Klein
July	Bruce & Emma Willis	Steven Klein
August	Lara Stone	Steven Klein
September	Kate Moss	Mert & Marcus
October	Uma Thurman	Steven Klein
November	Linda Evangelista	Pierpaolo Ferrari
December	Demi Moore	Mert & Marcus

== 2010s ==
=== 2010 ===
Issue	Cover model	Photographer
January	Jennifer Garner	Craig McDean
February	Rihanna	Craig McDean
March	Megan Fox	Craig McDean
April	Gerard Butler & Jennifer Aniston	Steven Klein
May	Julianna Margulies	Nathaniel Goldberg
June	Cate Blanchett	Craig McDean
July	Eva Mendes	Mert & Marcus
August	Rebecca Hall & Jon Hamm	Nathaniel Goldberg
September	Emma Roberts, Zoë Kravitz, & Mary Elizabeth Winstead; Kat Dennings & Jessica Chastain; Yaya DaCosta, Jennifer Lawrence, & Greta Gerwig	Inez & Vinoodh
October	Michelle Williams & Ryan Gosling	Inez & Vinoodh
November	Kim Kardashian	Mark Seliger
December	Katherine Heigl	Patrick Demarchelier

=== 2011 ===
Issue	Cover model	Photographer
January	Emma Stone & Garrett Hedlund	Inez & Vinoodh
February	Rooney Mara	Jean-Baptiste Mondino
March	Mila Kunis	Craig McDean
April	Mia Wasikowska & Michael Fassbender	Jean-Baptiste Mondino
May	January Jones	Craig McDean
June	Julia Roberts & Tom Hanks	Mario Sorrenti
July	Beyoncé	Patrick Demarchelier
July	Christina Aguilera	Daniele & Iango
August	Tilda Swinton	Tim Walker
September	Kristen Stewart	Mert & Marcus
October	Justin Timberlake & Amanda Seyfried	Michael Thompson
November	Nicki Minaj	Francesco Vezzoli
November	Sui He	Max Vadukul
December	Elle & Dakota Fanning	Mario Sorrenti

=== 2012 ===
Issue	Cover model	Photographer
January	Carey Mulligan	Michael Thompson
February	Brad Pitt & Charlize Theron	Mario Sorrenti
March	Kate Moss	Steven Klein
April	Jessica Biel	Mikael Jansson
May	Clive Owen & Nicole Kidman	Emma Summerton
June	Edita Vilkevičiūtė; Tom Cruise; Abbey Lee Kershaw	Mario Sorrenti
July	Joan Smalls & Karlie Kloss	Steven Meisel
August	Charlize Theron & Michael Fassbender	Mario Sorrenti
September	Penélope Cruz	Mert & Marcus
October	Jennifer Lawrence	Tim Walker
November	Keira Knightley, Mia Wasikowska, Rooney Mara, & Scarlett Johansson	Steven Klein
December	Marion Cotillard	Tim Walker

=== 2013 ===
Issue	Cover model	Photographer
January	Jessica Chastain	Chantal Joffe; Max Vadukul; Mickalene Thomas; Rineke Dijkstra
February	Emma Stone	Juergen Teller
March	Kate Moss, Lara Stone, & Natalia Vodianova	Mert & Marcus
April	Brit Marling & Eddie Redmayne	Alasdair McLellan
May	Tilda Swinton	Tim Walker
June/July	Emma Watson	Michael Thompson
August	Jennifer Lopez	Mario Sorrenti
September	Cara Delevingne	Mert & Marcus
October	Chloë Grace Moretz & Léa Seydoux	Craig McDean
November	Katy Perry	Mario Sorrenti
December/January 2014	George Clooney	Emma Summerton

=== 2014 ===
Issue	Cover model	Photographer
February	Amy Adams, Cate Blanchett, Jennifer Lawrence, Lupita Nyong'o, Matthew McConaughey, & Oprah Winfrey	Juergen Teller
March	Miley Cyrus	Mert & Marcus
April	Amanda Seyfried	Craig McDean
May	Rosamund Pike	David Fincher
June/July	Amber Heard	Steven Klein
August	Mila Kunis	Michael Thompson
September	Rihanna	Mert & Marcus
October	Cara Delevingne, Charlotte Casiraghi, Elliot Page, Kristen Wiig, & Naomi Campbell	Inez & Vinoodh
November	Daan van der Deen, Daria Werbowy, Kate Moss, Lara Stone, Raquel Zimmermann, Saskia de Brauw, Mariacarla Boscono, Steve Milatos, Suvi Koponen, Riley Montana, Karmen Pedaru, & Anna Ewers	Mert & Marcus
December/January 2015	Margot Robbie	Bill Viola

=== 2015 ===
Issue	Cover model	Photographer
February	Amy Adams, Benedict Cumberbatch & Keira Knightley, Bradley Cooper, Emma Stone, Julianne Moore, Reese Witherspoon, & Shailene Woodley	Tim Walker
March	Scarlett Johansson	Mert & Marcus
April	Alicia Vikander	Willy Vanderperre
May	Charlize Theron	Mert & Marcus
June/July	Jane Fonda	Steven Meisel
August	Taraji P. Henson	Mert & Marcus
September	Gigi Hadid	Steven Meisel
October	Adam Driver, Allison Williams, Claire Danes, Greta Gerwig, Jourdan Dunn, & Julianne Moore	Inez & Vinoodh
November	Jessica Chastain	Steven Klein
December/January 2016	Cate Blanchett	Tim Walker

=== 2016 ===
Issue	Cover model	Photographer
February	Alicia Vikander, Brie Larson, Carey Mulligan, Eddie Redmayne, Rooney Mara, & Saoirse Ronan	Peter Lindbergh
March	Selena Gomez	Steven Klein
April	Kiernan Shipka; Zendaya; Willow Smith	Willy Vanderperre
May	Jennifer Lopez	Inez & Vinoodh
June/July	Cara Delevingne	Mario Sorrenti
August	Eva Green	Mert & Marcus
September	Rihanna	Steven Klein
October	Chris Evans, Elle Fanning, Ethan Hawke, Halle Berry, Irina Shayk, Jodie Foster, Julia Louis-Dreyfus, Kanye West, Kit Harington, Priyanka Chopra & Rami Malek	Mario Sorrenti
November	Kendall Jenner & Gigi Hadid	Jason Kibbler
December	Barbra Streisand	Steven Meisel

=== 2017 ===
Issue	Cover model	Photographer
February	Amy Adams & Matthew McConaughey; Casey Affleck & Emma Stone; Mahershala Ali & Nicole Kidman; Michelle Williams & Joel Edgerton; Ruth Negga & Natalie Portman; Viggo Mortensen & Adam Driver	Craig McDean
March	Jennifer Lopez; Donatella Versace; Jessica Chastain; Taraji P. Henson; Kate Moss	Mert & Marcus
April	Anya Taylor-Joy	Paolo Roversi
April	Dane DeHaan	Craig McDean
May	Gal Gadot	Craig McDean
June/July	Natalia Vodianova	Steven Meisel
August	Charlize Theron	Alasdair McLellan
September	Katy Perry	Steven Klein
October	Chris Hemsworth, Hailee Steinfeld, James Corden, Jared Leto, Pharrell Williams, Robert Pattinson, Saoirse Ronan, Tilda Swinton, Tracee Ellis Ross, & Winona Ryder	Mario Sorrenti
November	Margot Robbie	Craig McDean
December	Mary J. Blige	Carrie Mae Weems
Holiday	Daniel Day-Lewis	Lynn Hirschberg

=== 2018 ===
Issue	Cover model	Photographer
Vol. 1	Daniela Vega & Robert Pattinson; Gal Gadot & James Franco; Jennifer Lawrence & Emma Stone; Margot Robbie & Nicole Kidman; Saoirse Ronan & Andrew Garfield; Tom Hanks & Mary J. Blige	Juergen Teller
Vol. 2	Florence Welch	Greta Gerwig
Vol. 2	Janelle Monáe	Jordan Peele
Vol. 2	Rianne van Rompaey & Adwoa Aboah	Luca Guadagnino
Vol. 3	Tiffany Haddish & Tye Sheridan	Ethan James Green
Vol. 4	Letitia Wright & Millie Bobby Brown	Alasdair McLellan
Vol. 5	Cate Blanchett	Alex Prager; Jackie Nickerson; Rineke Dijkstra; Shirin Neshat
Vol. 6	Bradley Cooper	Inez & Vinoodh
Vol. 6	Carey Mulligan	Alasdair McLellan
Vol. 7	Cardi B	Mickalene Thomas
Vol. 8	Gigi Hadid	Mert & Marcus

=== 2019 ===
Issue	Cover model	Photographer
Vol. 1	Claire Foy & Emily Blunt; Eddie Redmayne & Rami Malek; KiKi Layne & Jonah Hill; Mahershala Ali & Amy Adams; Margot Robbie & Michael B. Jordan; Nicole Kidman; Saoirse Ronan	Tim Walker
Vol. 2	Angela Bassett	LaToya Ruby Frazier
Vol. 2	Bel Powley	Collier Schorr
Vol. 2	Emma Stone	Yorgos Lanthimos
Vol. 2	Yalitza Aparicio	Carlos Somonte
Vol. 3	Henry Golding & Naomi Scott	Alasdair McLellan
Vol. 4	Cole Sprouse & Lili Reinhart	Steven Klein
Vol. 5	Anok Yai	Mert & Marcus
Vol. 5	Laura Harrier	Angelo Penetta
Vol. 5	Lily-Rose Depp	Tim Walker
Vol. 5	Margaret Qualley	Inez & Vinoodh
Vol. 6	Frank Ocean	Tim Walker
Vol. 6	Rosalía	Willy Vanderperre
Vol. 7	Kate Moss	Nikolai von Bismarck
Vol. 8	Nicole Kidman; Margot Robbie; Charlize Theron	Colin Dodgson

== 2020s ==
=== 2020 ===
Issue	Cover model	Photographer
Vol. 1	Adam Driver, Adam Sandler, Brad Pitt, Chris Evans, Eddie Murphy, Jennifer Lopez, Joaquin Phoenix, Laura Dern, & Scarlett Johansson	Juergen Teller
Vol. 2	Cho Yeo Jeong	Lee Jae Hyuk
Vol. 2	Debbie Harry	Stephen Shore
Vol. 2	Margaret Qualley & Mikey Madison	Angelo Penetta
Vol. 3	Dua Lipa	Tim Walker
Vol. 3	Megan Thee Stallion	Colin Dodgson
Vol. 4	Michaela Coel	Tim Walker
Vol. 4	Yahya Abdul-Mateen II	Wolfgang Tillmans

=== 2021 ===
Issue	Cover model	Photographer
Vol. 1	Andra Day, Gal Gadot, George Clooney, Lakeith Stanfield, Michelle Pfeiffer, Riz Ahmed, Sacha Baron Cohen, Tessa Thompson, & Vanessa Kirby	Juergen Teller
Vol. 2	Viola Davis & Genesis Tennon	Andre D. Wagner
Vol. 2	Elle Fanning, Kirsten Dunst & Rashida Jones	Zoë Ghertner
Vol. 2	Emerald Fennell	Emerald Fennell
Vol. 3	Bad Bunny	Martine Syms
Vol. 3	Saweetie	John Edmonds
Vol. 4	Emma Corrin	Tim Walker
Vol. 5	Dolly Parton	Harmony Korine
Vol. 6	Jibriil Ollow	Tim Walker
Vol. 6	Kylie Jenner, Travis Scott & Stormi Webster	Renell Medrano

=== 2022 ===
Issue	Cover model	Photographer
Vol. 1	Adam Driver, Benedict Cumberbatch, Cate Blanchett, Denzel Washington, Gemma Chan, Jennifer Hudson, Jessica Chastain, Kristen Stewart, Lady Gaga, Honor Swinton Byrne & Tilda Swinton	Tim Walker
Vol. 2	Penélope Cruz	Pedro Almodóvar
Vol. 2	Alana Haim	Paul Thomas Anderson
Vol. 2	Maggie Gyllenhaal	Willy Vanderperre
Vol. 2	Zendaya	Jack Davison
Vol. 3	Lana Del Rey	Jamie Hawkesworth
Vol. 4	Adut Akech	Rafael Pavarotti
Vol. 4	Alek Wek	Quil Lemons
Vol. 4	Amber Valletta	Michael Thompson
Vol. 4	Anok Yai	Rafael Pavarotti
Vol. 4	Bella Hadid	Rafael Pavarotti
Vol. 4	Binx Walton	Juergen Teller
Vol. 4	Christy Turlington	Michael Thompson
Vol. 4	Cindy Crawford	Inez and Vinoodh
Vol. 4	He Cong	Angelo Pennetta
Vol. 4	Iman	Inez and Vinoodh
Vol. 4	Karlie Kloss	Nigel Shafran
Vol. 4	Kendall Jenner	Rafael Pavarotti
Vol. 4	Loli Bahia	Inez and Vinoodh
Vol. 4	Naomi Campbell	Mert Alas and Marcus Piggott
Vol. 4	Precious Lee	Rafael Pavarotti
Vol. 4	Shalom Harlow	Michael Thompson
Vol. 4	Sora Choi	Inez and Vinoodh
Vol. 5	Kendrick Lamar	Renell Medrano
Vol. 6	Mariah Carey	Ethan James Green

=== 2023 ===
Issue	Cover model	Photographer
Vol. 1	Ana de Armas, Austin Butler, Brad Pitt, Brendan Fraser, Cate Blanchett, Daniel Craig, Eddie Redmayne, Jennifer Lawrence, Jonathan Majors, Margot Robbie, Michelle Williams, Michelle Yeoh, Taylor Russell & Zoë Kravitz	Jamie Hawkesworth
Vol. 2	Danielle Deadwyler	Todd Field
Vol. 2	Jennifer Coolidge	Lenne Chai
Vol. 2	Michelle Williams & Paul Dano	Janusz Kamiński
Vol. 3	Lily-Rose Depp & The Weeknd	Tyler Mitchell
Vol. 4	Kaia Gerber	Mert Alas
Vol. 4	Gigi Hadid	Mert Alas
Vol. 4	Kendall Jenner	Mert Alas
Vol. 4	Mona Tougaard	Mert Alas
Vol. 4	Liu Wen	Mert Alas
Vol. 4	Anok Yai	Mert Alas
Vol. 5	Sofia Coppola	Steven Meisel
Vol. 6	Emma Stone	Yorgos Lanthimos

=== 2024 ===
Issue	Cover model	Photographer
Vol. 1	Nicolas Cage	Juergen Teller
Vol. 1	Colman Domingo	Juergen Teller
Vol. 1	Robert Downey Jr	Juergen Teller
Vol. 1	Zac Efron	Juergen Teller
Vol. 1	Jodie Foster	Juergen Teller
Vol. 1	Lily Gladstone	Juergen Teller
Vol. 1	Ryan Gosling	Juergen Teller
Vol. 1	Greta Lee	Juergen Teller
Vol. 1	Charles Melton	Juergen Teller
Vol. 1	Julianne Moore	Juergen Teller
Vol. 1	Natalie Portman	Juergen Teller
Vol. 1	Da'Vine Joy Randolph	Juergen Teller
Vol. 1	Margot Robbie	Juergen Teller
Vol. 2	America Ferrera	Mickalene Thomas
Vol. 2	Barry Keoghan	Will Grundy
Vol. 2	Sandra Hüller	Tyler Mitchell
Vol. 3	Miley Cyrus	Alasdair McLellan
Summer Special	Hailey Bieber	David Sims
Vol. 4	Hunter Schafer	Tim Walker
Vol. 4	Zoë Kravitz	Tyler Mitchell
Vol. 4	Sabrina Carpenter	Zoë Ghertner
Vol. 4	Anna Sawai	Inez and Vinoodh
Vol. 5	A$AP Rocky	Rihanna
Vol. 6	Nicole Kidman	Robert Longo

=== 2025 ===
Issue	Cover model	Photographer/Artist
Vol. 1	Kingsley Ben-Adir	Mert and Marcus
Vol. 1	Adrien Brody	Mert and Marcus
Vol. 1	Daniel Craig	Mert and Marcus
Vol. 1	Colman Domingo	Mert and Marcus
Vol. 1	Cynthia Erivo	Mert and Marcus
Vol. 1	Selena Gomez	Mert and Marcus
Vol. 1	Mia Goth	Mert and Marcus
Vol. 1	Ariana Grande	Mert and Marcus
Vol. 1	Angelina Jolie	Mert and Marcus
Vol. 1	Nicole Kidman	Mert and Marcus
Vol. 1	Paul Mescal	Mert and Marcus
Vol. 1	Demi Moore	Mert and Marcus
Vol. 1	Saoirse Ronan	Mert and Marcus
Vol. 1	Zoe Saldaña	Mert and Marcus
Vol. 1	Tilda Swinton	Mert and Marcus
Vol. 1	Zendaya	Mert and Marcus
Vol. 2	Timothée Chalamet	Greig Fraser
Vol. 2	Ayo Edebiri	Luca Guadagnino
Vol. 2	Mikey Madison, Hoyeon	Alexis Zabé
Vol. 3	Chappell Roan	Tim Walker
Summer Special	Sydney Sweeney	Carlijn Jacobs
Vol. 4	Lana Del Rey	Steven Meisel
Vol. 4	Zoë Kravitz	Steven Meisel
Vol. 4	Julia Garner	Steven Meisel
Vol. 5	Addison Rae	Rafael Pavarotti
Vol. 6	Jennifer Lawrence	Wolfgang Tillmans
Vol. 6	Jennifer Lawrence	Elizabeth Peyton
Vol. 6	Jennifer Lawrence	Philippe Parreno

=== 2026 ===
Issue	Cover model	Photographer
Vol. 1	ASAP Rocky	Tyrone Lebon
Vol. 1	Benico del Toro	Tyrone Lebon
Vol. 1	Chase Infiniti	Tyrone Lebon
Vol. 1	Dwayne Johnson	Tyrone Lebon
Vol. 1	Elle Fanning	Tyrone Lebon
Vol. 1	Emma Stone	Tyrone Lebon
Vol. 1	George Clooney	Tyrone Lebon
Vol. 1	Greta Lee	Tyrone Lebon
Vol. 1	Jacob Elordi	Tyrone Lebon
Vol. 1	Jodie Foster	Tyrone Lebon
Vol. 1	Mia Goth	Tyrone Lebon
Vol. 1	Michael B. Jordan	Tyrone Lebon
Vol. 1	Renate Reinsve	Tyrone Lebon
Vol. 1	Sean Penn	Tyrone Lebon
Vol. 1	Sydney Sweeney	Tyrone Lebon
Vol. 1	Tessa Thompson	Tyrone Lebon
Vol. 2	Jessie Buckley	Łukasz Żal
Vol. 2	Teyana Taylor	Paul Thomas Anderson
Vol. 2	Timothée Chalamet	Josh Safdie
Vol. 3	Rihanna, Rocki Irish Mayers	Tim Walker
Summer Special	Gisele Bündchen	Karim Sadli
Vol.4	Harry Styles	David Sims
Vol.5	Hoyeon	Juergen Teller
Vol.5	Tate McRae	Juergen Teller
Vol.5	Inde Navarrette	Frank Lebon
Vol.5	Nathan Fielder	Frank Lebon
Vol.6	John Malkovich	Goshka Macuga
Vol.6	Parker Posey	Kembra Pfahler

== See also ==
- List of W China cover models
- List of W Korea cover models
