= List of L'Officiel USA cover models =

Cover of the Fall 2020 issue with Alton Mason and Shayna McNeil by Cass Bird

This list of L'Officiel USA cover models (1976–1980; 2018–present) is a catalog of cover models who have appeared on the cover of L'Officiel USA, the American edition of French fashion magazine L'Officiel.

== 1970s ==
=== 1976 ===
Issue	Cover model	Photographer	Ref.
Fall Collections	Barbara Jean Hughes	Rodolphe Haussaire	
Holiday	Allison Maher Stern	Roland Bianchini	

=== 1977 ===
Issue	Cover model	Photographer	Ref.
Spring		Patrick Bertrand	
Spring Collections			
Summer		Patrick Bertrand	
Fall	Clare Beresford	Rodolphe Haussaire	
September/October	Lyndall Meredith	Rodolphe Haussaire	
November/December	Marie Laforêt	Rodolphe Haussaire	

=== 1978 ===
Issue	Cover model	Photographer	Ref.
February/March			
April		Patrick Bertrand	
May/June		Michel Picard	
August		Henry Wolf	
September		Henry Wolf	
October		Rodolphe Haussaire	
November/December (Holiday)		Rodolphe Haussaire	

=== 1979 ===
Issue	Cover model	Photographer	Ref.
February	Nancy Dutiel	Henry Wolf	
March	Mel Harris	Henry Wolf	
April	Mimi Coutelier	Rodolphe Haussaire	
May/June	Christy Pickrell	Michel Picard	
August	Eva Voorhees		
September	Jessica Lange	Rebecca Blake	
October		Rebecca Blake	
November	Isa Jank	Rebecca Blake	
Holiday	Jaclyn Smith	Charles Bush	

== 1980s ==
=== 1980 ===
Issue	Cover model	Photographer	Ref.
February			
March	Susan Hess	Keith Trumbo	
April		Sammy Georges	
Summer			
August	Mia Nygren	Jamie La Valley	

== 2010s ==
=== 2018 ===
Issue	Cover model	Photographer	Ref.
February/March	Lana Del Rey	Mick Rock	
April/May	Chloë Grace Moretz	Myro Wulff	
June/July	Angela Lindvall	Daria Kobayashi Ritch	
September/October	Rowan Blanchard	Daria Kobayashi Ritch	
Winter 2018/19	Viola Davis	Danielle Levitt	

=== 2019 ===
Issue	Cover model	Photographer	Ref.
Spring	Julianne Moore	Zoey Grossmann	
Spring	Zoë Kravitz	Zoey Grossmann	
Summer	Kendall Jenner	Russell James	
Art & Philanthropy special	Chloe Wise	Katie McCurdy	
Fall	Doona Bae	Danny Lowe	
Fall	Adèle Exarchopoulos	Danny Lowe	
Fall	Solange Knowles	Rafael Rios	
Winter	Ebonee Davis	Micaiah Carter	

== 2020s ==
=== 2020 ===
Issue	Cover model	Photographer	Ref.
Spring	Lili Reinhart	Jory Lee Cordy	
Summer	Shira Haas	Elliot Kennedy	
Fall	Alton Mason, Shayna McNeil	Cass Bird	
Fall	Maisie Williams	Marili Andre	
Winter	Lily Collins	Sam-Taylor Johnson	

=== 2021 ===
Issue	Cover model	Photographer	Ref.
Spring	Sienna Miller	Tom Munro	
Summer	Laura Harrier	Danielle Levitt	
Summer	Katy Perry	Greg Swales	
Summer	Willow Smith	Myles Loftin	
Fall	Jessica Chastain	Alexi Lubomirski	
Winter	Elle Fanning	Danielle Levitt	

=== 2022 ===
Issue	Cover model	Photographer	Ref.
Spring	Maude Apatow	Carlotta Kohl	
Summer	Dogami	—N/a	
Summer	Janet Jumbo	Menelik Puryear	
Summer	Arthur Madrid, Sébastian Borget	Kenzia Bengel de Vaulx	
Summer	Kerry Washington	Texas Isaiah	
Fall	Ana de Armas	Thomas Whiteside	
Winter	Maggie Rogers	Céleste Sloman	
Winter	Sadie Sink	Léa Winkler	

=== 2023 ===
Issue	Cover model	Photographer	Ref.
Spring	Cynthia Erivo	Axle Jozeph	
Spring	Sabrina Impacciatore	Erica Fava	
Spring	Mae Mei Lapres	Filippo Tarentini	
Summer	Gal Gadot	Nick Thompson	
Summer	Eiza González	Céleste Sloman	
Fall	Jay Chou	Paul Zhang	
Fall	Emma Corrin	Tung Walsh	
November	Sofia Richie Grainge	Dennis Leupold	
December/January 2024	Adrian Cheng	Alan Gelati	
December/January 2024	Vanessa Kirby	Céleste Sloman	

=== 2024 ===
Issue	Cover model	Photographer	Ref.
March	Dakota Johnson	Quil Lemons	
May	Natalie Portman	Ellen von Unwerth	
May	Jackson Wang	Liu Song	
June	Megan Thee Stallion	Quil Lemons	
September	Nicole Kidman	Matthew Brookes	
September	Sasha Pivovarova	Heather Hazzan	
November	Salma Hayek Pinault	Charlie Gray	
December/January 2025	Julianne Moore	David Roemer	

=== 2025 ===
Issue	Cover model	Photographer	Ref.
March	Amanda Seyfried	Cameron McCool	
May	Ciara	Emman Montalvan	
May	Isabela Merced	Lauren Leekley	
May	Lilli Zoe, Seng Khan, Nyouma Tacheboubet	Alexandre Roy-Gilbert (Royal Gilbert)	
June	Orlando Bloom	Luca Morelli, Alessandro Morelli (The Morelli Brothers)	
July/August	Jackson Wang	Rob Rusling	
September	Jessica Chastain	JuanKr	
November	Florence Welch	Autumn de Wilde	
December/January 2026	Zoey Deutch	David Roemer	
December/January 2026	Kelly Rowland	Ricardo Abrahao	
December/January 2026	Michelle Yeoh	Domen & Van De Velde	

=== 2026 ===
Issue	Cover model	Photographer	Ref.
March	Grace Burns	Heather Hazzan	
March	Fala Chen	Walter Chin	
March	Penélope Cruz	Greg Swales	
May	Kate Hudson	Chantal Anderson	
June	Anya Taylor-Joy	Szilveszter Makó	
July/August	Travis Scott	Greg Swales	
September	Angelina Jolie	Norman Jean Roy	
November	Rashid Johnson	Rashid Johnson	
November	Precious Okoyomon	Dozie Kanu	
November	Sarah Paulson	Chantal Anderson	
November	Debra Shaw	Arseny Jabiev	
December/January 2027	Meghann Fahy	Céleste Sloman	

== See also ==
- List of Harper's Bazaar cover models
- List of Vogue cover models
- List of W cover models
