= List of people on the cover of GQ Russia =

This is a list of people who have appeared on the cover of GQ Russia, the Russian edition of GQ magazine, starting with the magazine's first issue in March 2001.

== 2001 ==
Issue	Cover model	Photographer
March	Monica Bellucci	
April	Martina Colombari	
May/June	Greta Cavazzoni	
July/August	Veronika Vařeková	
September	Andrei Shevchenko	
October		
November	Carré Otis	
December/January 2002	Charlize Theron	

== 2002 ==
Issue	Cover model	Photographer
February	Caroline Ribeiro	
March	Halle Berry	
April	Arnold Schwarzenegger	
May	Saira Mohan	
June/July	Ana Hickmann	
August	Milla Jovovich	
September	Oliver Kahn	
October	Lara Flynn Boyle	
November	Jennifer Lopez	
December	Pierce Brosnan	

== 2003 ==
Issue	Cover model	Photographer
January		
February	Asia Argento	
March	Cameron Diaz	
April	Heidi Klum	
May	Salma Hayek	
June	Hugh Grant	
July/August	Estella Warren	
September	David & Victoria Beckham	
October		
November	Roman Abramovich	
December		

== 2004 ==
Issue	Cover model	Photographer
January	Andrei Shevchenko	
February	Tom Cruise	
March	Naomi Campbell	
April		
May		
June	Angelina Jolie	
July	Paris Hilton	
August		
September	Jude Law	
October		
November	Colin Farrell	
December		

== 2005 ==
Issue	Cover model	Photographer
January		
February		
March	Gwen Stefani	
April		
May		
June		
July	Pamela Anderson	
August	Elisabetta Canalis	
September	Brad Pitt	
October	Domenico Dolce & Stefano Gabbana	
November	Marat Safin	
December	Robbie Williams	

== 2006 ==
Issue	Cover model	Photographer
January	Eva Green	
February	Victoria Beckham	
March	Jake Gyllenhaal	Michael Thompson
April		
May	Jennifer Aniston	
June		
July	Bar Refaeli	
August	Ilary Blasi	
September	Josh Hartnett	
October	t.A.T.u.	Ali Mahdavi
November		
December		

== 2007 ==
Issue	Cover model	Photographer
January	Ashton Kutcher	
February	Lindsay Lohan	
March	Clive Owen	
April	Scarlett Johansson	
May		
June		
July	Naomi Campbell	
August	Marco Materazzi	
September	Jonathan Rhys Meyers	Julian Broad
October		
November	Hugh Jackman	
December	Pamela Anderson	

== 2008 ==
Issue	Cover model	Photographer
January	Arnold Schwarzenegger	
February	Hayden Christensen	
March	Tom Ford	
April	Matthew McConaughey	Tom Munro
May	Paris Hilton	
June	Cameron Diaz	
July	Daria Werbowy	
August	Madonna	
September	Christian Bale	Vincent Peters
October	Irina Kudrina; Guus Hiddink; Vladimir Sorokin; Ivan Urgant; Evgeny Mironov; Vladimir Pozner; Alexander Ovechkin; Valentin Yudashkin; Kirill Ivanov; David Desso; Albert Popkov; Yuri Zhirkov; Victor Loshak; Evgeny Lebedev; Sergey Selyanov	Gulliver Theis
November	Daniel Craig	Simon Emmett
December	Vincent Cassel	

== 2009 ==
Issue	Cover model	Photographer
January	Anne Hathaway	
February	Jennifer Aniston	
March	James Franco	
April	Ewan McGregor	
May	Clive Owen	
June	Adriana Lima	
July	Heidi Klum	
August	Monica Bellucci	
September	Bruce Willis & Emma Heming	
October	Konstantin Ernst; Mikhail Prokhorov; Nikolay Valuev; Andrei Arshavin	
November	Brad Pitt	
December	Robert Pattinson	

== 2010 ==
Issue	Cover model	Photographer
January	January Jones	Terry Richardson
February	Rihanna	Michael Thompson
March	David Beckham	
April	Helena Christensen; Claudia Schiffer; Eva Herzigová	Kayt Jones
May	Jake Gyllenhaal	Brigitte Lacombe
June	Olivia Wilde	Peggy Sirota
July	Christina Aguilera	Alix Malka
August	Ilary Blasi	Mark Liddell
September	Shia LaBeouf	Nathaniel Goldberg
October	Naomi Campbell	
November	Jon Hamm	Vincent Peters
December	Jessica Alba	Gavin Bond

== 2011 ==
Issue	Cover model	Photographer
January	Javier Bardem	Nigel Parry
February	Scarlett Johansson	Inez & Vinoodh
March	Hugh Laurie	
April	Candice Swanepoel; Lindsay Ellingson; Lily Aldridge; Erin Heatherton	Vincent Peters
May	Johnny Depp	Annie Leibovitz
June	Daisy Lowe	Miles Aldridge
July	Heidi Klum	Rankin
August	Monica Bellucci	Vincent Peters
September	George Clooney	Marco Grob
October	Tom Ford	Nigel Parry
November	Ryan Gosling	Mario Testino
December	Tom Cruise	Nigel Parry

== 2012 ==
Issue	Cover model	Photographer
January	Daniel Craig	
February	Robert Pattinson	Carter Smith
March	Michael Fassbender	Vincent Peters
April	Keira Knightley	Norman Jean Roy
May	Jon Hamm	Jeff Lipsky
June	Roman Shirokov	Danil Golovkin
July	Natalia Vodianova	Cuneyt Akeroglu
August	Mila Kunis	Nathaniel Goldberg
September	Jeremy Renner	Cliff Watts
October	Michael Phelps	Mark Seliger
November	Javier Bardem	Nathaniel Goldberg
December	Lana Del Rey	Mariano Vivanco

== 2013 ==
Issue	Cover model	Photographer
January	Rihanna	Mario Sorrenti
February	Adrien Brody	Danil Golovkin
March	Fyodor Bondarchuk	Danil Golovkin
April	Beyoncé	Terry Richardson
May	Robert Downey Jr.	
June	Gerard Butler	Danil Golovkin
July	Ashley Greene	Benny Horne
August	Irina Shayk	David Roemer
September	Justin Timberlake	Scott Garfield
October	Ben Affleck	
November	Brad Pitt	Fred R. Conrad
December	Michael Fassbender	Mario Testino

== 2014 ==
Issue	Cover model	Photographer
January	Benedict Cumberbatch	Annie Leibovitz
February	Miley Cyrus	Rankin
March	George Clooney	Emma Summerton
April	Matthew McConaughey	Sebastian Kim
May	Hugh Jackman	Nino Muñoz
June	Katy Perry	Peggy Sirota
July	Channing Tatum	Sebastian Kim
August	Bianca Balti	John Russo
September	Evgeny Tsyganov	Danil Golovkin
October	Konstantin Ernst	Slava Filippov
November	Robert Downey Jr.	Sam Jones
December	Amber Heard	Ellen von Unwerth

== 2015 ==
Issue	Cover model	Photographer
January	Danila Kozlovsky	Anton Zemlyanoy
February	Colin Firth	Mariano Vivanco
March	Kevin Spacey	Marco Grob
April	Sergey Shnurov	Natalie Arefieva
May	Ivan Urgant	Danil Golovkin
June	Jon Hamm	Gavin Bond
July	Jessica Alba	Greg Lotus
August	Melissa Satta	Signe Vilstrup
September	Konstantin Khabensky	Anton Zemlyanoy
October	Polina Gagarina	Slava Filippov
November	Monica Bellucci	Ellen von Unwerth
December	Leonardo DiCaprio	Max Vadukul

== 2016 ==
Issue	Cover model	Photographer
January	David Beckham	Gavin Bond
February	Emily Ratajkowski	Mario Testino
March	Philipp Kirkorov	Alekley Kolpakov
April	Michael Fassbender	Yann Rabanier
May	Robert Downey Jr.	Gavin Bond
June	Cristiano Ronaldo & Alessandra Ambrosio	Ben Watts
July	Mike Tyson	Marco Grob
August	Vincent Cassel	Marcel Hartmann
September	Matt Damon	Sebastian Kim
October	Sergey Shnurov	Slava Filippov
November	Benedict Cumberbatch	Yu Tsai
December	Eddie Redmayne	Tom Munro

== 2017 ==
Issue	Cover model	Photographer
January	Fyodor Bondarchuk	Danil Golovkin
February	Ryan Gosling	Steve Granitz
March	Tom Hiddleston	Nathaniel Goldberg
April	Ewan McGregor	Jason Bell
May	Conor McGregor	Thomas Whiteside
June	Jennifer Lopez	Joe Pugliese
July	Dwayne Johnson	Peggy Sirota
August	Alessandra Ambrosio	Stewart Shining
September	Ivan Dorn	Danil Golovkin
October	Basta (Front cover) + Timati & Yury Dud' (Fold out)	
November	Chris Hemsworth	Doug Inglish
December	Dmitry Nagiev	Danil Golovkin

== 2018 ==
Issue	Cover model	Photographer
January	David Beckham	Alasdair McLellan
February	Arnold Schwarzenegger	Doug Inglish
March	Robert Pattinson	Daniel Jackson
April	Danila Kozlovsky	Danil Golovkin

== GQ Style ==
Issue	Cover model	Photographer
#1. Fall/Winter 2007	Sam Saffman & André Ziehe	—
#2. Spring/Summer 2008	Jeremy Dufour	—
#3. Fall/Winter 2008	Sean O'Pry	Arnaldo Anaya-Lucca
#4. Spring/Summer 2009	David Gandy	Robert Jaso
#5. Fall/Winter 2009	Noah Mills	David Roemer
#6. Spring/Summer 2010	Domenico Dolce & Stefano Gabbana	
#7. Fall/Winter 2010	Stan Jouk; Vali Cosa; Tyler Riggs	Gulliver Theis
#8. Spring/Summer 2011	River Viiperi & Sebastian Sauve	Arnaldo Anaya-Lucca
#9. Fall/Winter 2011	Emilio Flores	Van Mossevelde + N
#10. Spring/Summer 2012	Tyson Ballou	Doug Inglish
#11. Fall/Winter 2012	Mark Ronson	Damon Baker
#12. Spring/Summer 2013	Gabriel Macht & Patrick Adams	Danielle Levitt
#13. Fall/Winter 2013	Sean O'Pry	Taka Mayumi
#14. Spring/Summer 2014	Jacey Elthalion	Rhys Frampton
#15. Fall/Winter 2014	Chris Folz	Richard Phibbs
#16. Spring/Summer 2015	Sahib Faber	Greg Lotus
#17. Fall/Winter 2015	Oliver Cheshire	Arnaldo Anaya-Lucca
#18. Spring/Summer 2016	Tobias Sorensen	Walter Chin
#19. Fall/Winter 2016	Arthur Kulkov	Arnaldo Anaya-Lucca
#20. Spring/Summer 2017	Josh Beech	Jegor Zaika
