= List of people on the cover of GQ =

These people featured on the cover of GQ magazine:

== 1990s ==
=== 1990 ===
Issue	Cover model	Photographer
January	Jack Nicholson	
February	Alec Baldwin	
March	Bo Jackson	
April	Bryan Brown	
May	Arnold Schwarzenegger	
June	David Letterman	
July	Steve Martin	
August	Nicolas Cage	
September	Jim Everett	
October	James Spader	
November	Jeremy Irons	
December	Andy García	

=== 1991 ===
Issue	Cover model	Photographer
January	Robert De Niro	
February	Julia Roberts	
March	Steven Seagal	
April	Matt Dillon	
May	Woody Harrelson	
June	Kurt Russell	
July	Kevin Costner	
August	Don Henley	
September	Boris Becker	
October	Nick Nolte	
November	Ray Liotta	
December	Armand Assante	

=== 1992 ===
Issue	Cover model	Photographer
January	John F. Kennedy	
February	Patrick Swayze	
March	Bridget Fonda	
April	John Goodman	
May	Jerry Seinfeld	
June	Michael Keaton	
July	Eddie Murphy	
August	Kyle MacLachlan	
September	Al Pacino	
October	Tim Robbins	
November	Bill Clinton, Al Gore	
December	Tom Cruise	

=== 1993 ===
Issue	Cover model	Photographer
January	Robert Downey Jr.	
February	Magic Johnson	
March	Clint Eastwood	
April	Charles III	
May	Cal Ripken	
June	Arnold Schwarzenegger	
July	Ted Danson	
August	David Letterman	
September	Troy Aikman	
October	Johnny Depp	
November	Shaquille O'Neal	
December	Liam Neeson	

=== 1994 ===
Issue	Cover model	Photographer
January	Denzel Washington	
February	Geena Davis	
March	Tommy Lee Jones	
April	Barry Bonds, Willie Mays	
May	David Caruso	
June	Harrison Ford	
July	Jeff Bridges	
August	Ralph Fiennes	
September	Jimmy Johnson	
October	Michael Jackson	
November	Charles Barkley	
December	Hugh Grant	

=== 1995 ===
Issue	Cover model	Photographer
January	Paul Newman	
February	Uma Thurman	
March	George Clooney	
April	Grant Hill	
May	Mel Gibson	
June	Tom Hanks	
July	Andy Garcia	
August	Jean-Claude Van Damme	
September	Steve Young	
October	John Travolta	
November	Sharon Stone	
December	Antonio Banderas	

=== 1996 ===
Issue	Cover model	Photographer
January	Jack Nicholson	
February	Tyra Banks	
March	David Schwimmer	
April	Ken Griffey Jr.	
May	Julia Ormond	
June	Bruce Willis	
July	Andre Agassi	
August	Jackie Chan	
September	Dan Marino	
October	Elisabeth Shue	
November	Mel Gibson, Michael Jordan, Jerry Seinfeld	
December	Tom Cruise	

=== 1997 ===
Issue	Cover model	Photographer
January	David Duchovny	
February	Rebecca Romijn, Dennis Rodman	
March	Nicolas Cage	
April	Tiger Woods	
May	Maria Grazia Cucinotta	
June	Will Smith	
July	Matthew McConaughey	
August	Mira Sorvino	
September	Sean Penn	
October	George Clooney	
November	Tom Cruise, David Duchovny, Grant Hill	
December	John Cusack	

=== 1998 ===
Issue	Cover model	Photographer
January	Alonzo Mourning, Pat Riley, Tim Hardaway	
February	Ben Affleck	
March	Liam Neeson	
April	Muhammad Ali	
May	Daniela Peštová	
June	Martina Hingis	
July	Ralph Fiennes	
August	Liv Tyler	
September	Derek Jeter	
October	Hugh Grant	
November	Harrison Ford, George Clooney, Chris Rock	
December	Vince Vaughn	

=== 1999 ===
Issue	Cover model	Photographer
January	Heidi Klum	
February	Evander Holyfield	
March	Russell Crowe	
April	Mike Piazza	
May	Ewan McGregor	
June	Mike Myers	
July	Pat Rafter	
August	Sean Combs	
September	Terrell Davis	
October	Ashley Judd	
November	Tom Hanks, Will Smith, Dylan McDermott	
December	Matt Damon	

== 2000s ==
=== 2000 ===
Issue	Cover model	Photographer
January	Tyra Banks	
February	Penélope Cruz	
March	Harrison Ford; Tom Cruise	
April	Derek Jeter; Alex Rodriguez; Nomar Garciaparra	
May	Estella Warren	
June	Joaquin Phoenix	
July	Mark Wahlberg	
August	Anna Kournikova	
September	Brendan Fraser	
October	Kevin Spacey	
November	Pierce Brosnan; Matthew Perry; Shaquille O'Neal	
December	Charlize Theron	

=== 2001 ===
Issue	Cover model	Photographer
January	Philip Seymour Hoffman	
February	Edward Burns	
March	Ed Norton	
April	Jamie King	
May	Ben Affleck	
June	Heath Ledger	
July	Julianne Moore	
August	Chris Tucker	
September	Ben Stiller	
October	Mario Lemieux; Kobe Bryant	
November	Benicio del Toro; Kobe Bryant; Ben Affleck	
December	Will Smith	

=== 2002 ===
Issue	Cover model	Photographer
January	Hugh Jackman	
February	Guy Pearce	
March	Tobey Maguire	
April	Katie Holmes	
May	The Male Species	
June	Chris Rock	
July	Jude Law	
August	Vin Diesel	
September	Heidi Klum	
October	Tom Brady; Kevin Garnett	
November	Ralph Lauren; Hugh Grant; Denzel Washington	
December	Jennifer Lopez	

=== 2003 ===
Issue	Cover model	Photographer
January	George Clooney	
February	Sam Rockwell	
March	Jennifer Garner	
April	Bernie Mac	
May	Keanu Reeves	
June	Eva Mendes	
July	Eric Bana	
August	Johnny Depp	
September	Johnny Knoxville	
October	Dwayne Johnson	
November	Colin Farrell; Adrien Brody	
December	Uma Thurman	

=== 2004 ===
Issue	Cover model	Photographer
January	Orlando Bloom	
February	Ashton Kutcher	
March	Angelina Jolie	
April	Viggo Mortensen	
May	Karolína Kurková	
June	Jake Gyllenhaal	
July	Will Ferrell	
August	Halle Berry	
September	Justin Timberlake	
October	Lindsay Lohan	
November	Colin Farrell	
December	Jude Law; Tom Cruise; James Gandolfini	

=== 2005 ===
Issue	Cover model	Photographer
January	Kate Bosworth	Bruce Weber
February	Jamie Foxx	Michael Thompson
March	Russell Crowe	Nathaniel Goldberg
April	Jessica Alba	Mark Seliger
May	Hayden Christensen	Mario Testino
June	Brad Pitt	Mario Testino
July	Jessica Simpson	Peggy Sirota
August	Johnny Knoxville	David Sims
September	Tom Brady	Bruce Weber
October	Cameron Diaz	Patrick Demarchelier
November	Orlando Bloom	Mario Testino
December	50 Cent; Jennifer Aniston; Vince Vaughn	Peggy Sirota

=== 2006 ===
Issue	Cover model	Photographer
January	Jack Black	Mark Seliger
February	Heath Ledger	Nathaniel Goldberg
March	Matthew Fox	Peggy Sirota
April	Adriana Lima	Steven Klein
May	Tom Cruise	Brigitte Lacombe
June	Christina Aguilera	Michael Thompson
July	Will Ferrell	Mark Seliger
August	Justin Timberlake	Steven Klein
September	Clive Owen	Nathaniel Goldberg
October	Josh Hartnett	Terry Richardson
November	Dwyane Wade	Peggy Sirota
December	Jay-Z; Leonardo DiCaprio; Will Ferrell	Terry Richardson

=== 2007 ===
Issue	Cover model	Photographer
January	Robert De Niro	David Bailey
February	Jake Gyllenhaal	Nathaniel Goldberg
March	Christian Bale	Nathaniel Goldberg
April	Lindsay Lohan	Terry Richardson
May	Stephen Colbert	Mark Seliger
June	Jessica Alba	Terry Richardson
July	Jessica Biel	Michael Thompson
August	Matt Damon	Nathaniel Goldberg
September	Barack Obama	Peggy Sirota
October	Paul Newman	
November	Ryan Gosling	Nathaniel Goldberg
December	Bill Clinton	Brigitte Lacombe
December	Daniel Craig; Kanye West	Nathaniel Goldberg

=== 2008 ===
Issue	Cover model	Photographer
January	Josh Brolin	Mark Seliger
February	Rachel Bilson	Ellen von Unwerth
March	Eric Bana	Michael Thompson
April	Adriana Lima	Inez & Vinoodh
May	Robert Downey Jr.	Terry Richardson
June	Shia LaBeouf	Peggy Sirota
July	Gisele Bündchen	Inez & Vinoodh
August	Seth Rogen	Peggy Sirota
September	James Franco	Nathaniel Goldberg
October	Megan Fox	Terry Richardson
November	Jimmy Kimmel	Mark Seliger
December	Barack Obama; Jon Hamm; Leonardo DiCaprio; Michael Phelps	Mark Seliger

=== 2009 ===
Issue	Cover model	Photographer
January	Jennifer Aniston	Michael Thompson
February	LeBron James	Nathaniel Goldberg
March	Justin Timberlake	Peggy Sirota
April	Robert Pattinson	Nathaniel Goldberg
May	Zac Efron	Peggy Sirota
June	Christian Bale	Terry Richardson
July	Brüno	Mark Seliger
August	Channing Tatum	Mario Testino
September	Michael Jackson	Bonnie Schiffman
October	Olivia Wilde	Peggy Sirota
November	January Jones	Terry Richardson
December	Barack Obama; Chris Pine; Clint Eastwood; Ed Helms, Zach Galifianakis, & Bradley Cooper; Tom Brady	Martin Schoeller

== 2010s ==
=== 2010 ===
Issue	Cover model	Photographer
January	Rihanna	Michael Thompson
February	Johnny Depp	Patrick Demarchelier
March	Kobe Bryant	Terry Richardson
April	Shia LaBeouf	Nathaniel Goldberg
May	Jake Gyllenhaal	Peggy Sirota
June	Miranda Kerr	Inez & Vinoodh
July	Taylor Lautner	Mario Testino
August	Paul Rudd; Tracy Morgan; Zach Galifianakis	Terry Richardson
September	LeBron James	Ben Watts
October	Ryan Reynolds	Peggy Sirota
November	Dianna Agron, Cory Monteith, & Lea Michele	Terry Richardson
December	Drake; James Franco; Jeff Bridges; Scarlett Johansson; Stephen Colbert	Inez & Vinoodh

=== 2011 ===
Issue	Cover model	Photographer
January	Ryan Gosling	Mario Testino
February	Muhammad Ali	
March	Channing Tatum	Nathaniel Goldberg
April	Derek Jeter	Terry Richardson
May	Zach Galifianakis	Martin Schoeller
June	Alexander Skarsgård	Carter Smith
July	Chris Evans	Mario Testino
August	Mila Kunis	Terry Richardson
September	Mark Sanchez	Ben Watts
October	Leonardo DiCaprio	Craig McDean
November	Eminem, Keith Richards, & Lil Wayne	Mark Seliger
December	Jay Z Justin Timberlake & Jimmy Fallon; Michael Fassbender; Mila Kunis	Nathaniel Goldberg

=== 2012 ===
Issue	Cover model	Photographer
January	Matt Damon	Ben Watts
February	Michelle Williams	Michael Thompson
March	Paul Rudd & Jennifer Aniston	Terry Richardson
April	Dave Franco; Drake; John Slattery	Sebastian Kim
May	Derrick Rose	Nathaniel Goldberg
June	Michael Fassbender	Mario Testino
July	Kate Upton	Terry Richardson
August	Joseph Gordon-Levitt	Nathaniel Goldberg
September	Cam Newton	Peggy Sirota
September	Tim Tebow	Mark Seliger
October	Chris Paul; Denzel Washington; Javier Bardem	Nathaniel Goldberg
November	Jeremy Lin	Paola Kudacki
December	Ben Affleck; Channing Tatum	Sebastian Kim
December	Rihanna	Mario Sorrenti

=== 2013 ===
Issue	Cover model	Photographer
January	Bill Murray	Peggy Sirota
February	Beyoncé	Terry Richardson
March	Bruce Willis	Mario Testino
April	Bruno Mars; Jason Bateman; Jimmy Fallon	Peggy Sirota
May	Robert Downey Jr.	Peggy Sirota
June	James Franco	Terry Richardson
July	Drake	Mario Sorrenti
August	Bryan Cranston	Nathaniel Goldberg
September	Colin Kaepernick; RG3	Ben Watts
October	Idris Elba; Jeff Bridges; Justin Theroux	Sebastian Kim
November	Michael Fassbender	Peggy Sirota
December	James Gandolfini; Justin Timberlake; Kendrick Lamar; Matthew McConaughey; Will Ferrell	Sebastian Kim

=== 2014 ===
Issue	Cover model	Photographer
January	Bradley Cooper	Peggy Sirota
February	Katy Perry	Peggy Sirota
March	LeBron James	Terry Richardson
April	Kit Harington; Liam Neeson; Pharrell Williams	Paola Kudacki
May	Louis C.K.	Peggy Sirota
June	Channing Tatum	Sebastian Kim
July	Emily Ratajkowski	Michael Thompson
August	Kanye West	Patrick Demarchelier
September	Adam Driver	Paola Kudacki
October	Blake Griffin; Clive Owen; Norman Reedus	Sebastian Kim
November	Matthew McConaughey	Peggy Sirota
December	Ansel Elgort; Chris Pratt; Dave Chappelle; Michael Sam; Shailene Woodley; Steve Carell	Ben Watts

=== 2015 ===
Issue	Cover model	Photographer
January	Chris Hemsworth	Sebastian Kim
February	Pharrell Williams	Pari Dukovic
March	Kobe Bryant; Kevin Love; Kevin Durant	Peggy Sirota
April	Jon Hamm	Peggy Sirota
May	Kendall Jenner	Steven Klein
June	Chris Pratt	Peggy Sirota
July	Brad Pitt; Jay-Z & Beyoncé; Bradley Cooper; Pharrell Williams; Ryan Gosling; Kanye West	
August	Amy Schumer	Mark Seliger
September	Stephen Colbert	Sebastian Kim
October	Michael B. Jordan; Rob Lowe; Ryan Reynolds	Peggy Sirota
November	Taylor Swift	Michael Thompson
December	Barack Obama; Tom Brady	Inez & Vinoodh

=== 2016 ===
Issue	Cover model	Photographer
January	Oscar Isaac	Nathaniel Goldberg
February	Cristiano Ronaldo & Alessandra Ambrosio	Ben Watts
March	Justin Bieber	Eric Ray Davidson
April	David Beckham	Alasdair McLellan
May	Future; Ryan Reynolds; Tom Hardy; Drake; Lucky Blue Smith	
June	Hailey Clauson & Rob Gronkowski	Peggy Sirota
July	Kim Kardashian	Mert & Marcus
August	Matt Damon	Sebastian Kim
September	Cam Newton	Mario Testino
October	James Marsden; Kurt Russell; Lin-Manuel Miranda	Sebastian Kim
November	Russell Westbrook	Peggy Sirota
December	Ryan Reynolds; Usain Bolt; Warren Beatty	Alasdair McLellan

=== 2017 ===
Issue	Cover model	Photographer
January	Ryan Gosling	Craig McDean
February	Chance the Rapper; The Weeknd	Eric Ray Davidson
March	Tom Hiddleston	Nathaniel Goldberg
April	Roger Federer	Craig McDean
May	Stephen Curry	Sebastian Kim
June	Dwayne Johnson	Peggy Sirota
July	Mahershala Ali	Peggy Sirota
August	John Boyega	Sebastian Kim
September	Robert Pattinson	Daniel Jackson
October	Harrison Ford	Peter Hapak
November	LeBron James	Pari Dukovic
December/January	Colin Kaepernick	Martin Schoeller
December/January	Gal Gadot	Cass Bird
December/January	Kevin Durant	Nathaniel Goldberg
December/January	Stephen Colbert	Mark Seliger

=== 2018 ===
Issue	Cover model	Photographer
February	Jimmy Kimmel	Eric Ray Davidson
March	Timothée Chalamet	Ryan McGinley
April	Diddy	Maciek Kobielski
May	James Harden	Erik Madigan Heck
June	Issa Rae, Kate McKinnon & Sarah Silverman	Martin Schoeller
July	Zayn Malik	Sebastian Mader
August	Travis Scott & Kylie Jenner	Paola Kudacki
September	Chris Hemsworth	Alasdair McLellan
October	Paul McCartney	Collier Schorr
November	Ryan Gosling	Giampaolo Sgura
December/January	Henry Golding	Pari Dukovic
December/January	Jonah Hill	Jason Nocito
December/January	Michael B. Jordan	Awol Erizku
December/January	Serena Williams	Kristin-Lee Moolman

=== 2019 ===
Issue	Cover model	Photographer
February	Frank Ocean	Alasdair McLellan
March	Lucas Hedges	Ryan McGinley
April	J. Cole	Awol Erizku
May	Keanu Reeves	Daniel Jackson
June/July	Seth Rogen	Sebastian Mader
August	Odell Beckham Jr.	Paola Kudacki
September	Rami Malek	Ryan McGinley
October	Brad Pitt	Lachlan Bailey
November	Pharrell Williams	Micaiah Carter
December/January	Jennifer Lopez	Daniel Jackson
December/January	Tyler, the Creator	Casper Kofi
December/January	Al Pacino & Robert De Niro	Richard Burbridge

== 2020s ==
=== 2020 ===
Issue	Cover model	Photographer
January	Steve Lacy	
February	Larry David	Jason Nocito
March	James Harden & Russell Westbrook	Sebastian Mader
April	Daniel Craig	Lachlan Bailey
May	Kanye West	Tyler Mitchell
June/July	Robert Pattinson	Robert Pattinson
August	Patrick Mahomes	Pari Dukovic
September	Travis Scott	Adrienne Raquel
October	Jonathan Majors	Shaniqwa Jarvis
November	Timothée Chalamet	Renell Medrano
December/January	Megan Thee Stallion	Adrienne Raquel
December/January	Trevor Noah	Shaniqwa Jarvis
December/January	George Clooney	Zach Baron

=== 2021 ===
Issue	Cover model	Photographer
February	Zendaya	Tyrell Hampton
March	Megan Rapinoe & Sue Bird	Sam Taylor-Johnson
March	Naomi Osaka & Cordae	Renell Medrano
March	Russell Wilson & Ciara	Micaiah Carter
April	Steven Yeun	Diana Markosian
May	Justin Bieber	Ryan McGinley
June/July	A$AP Rocky	Inez & Vinoodh
August	Jason Sudeikis	Hill & Aubrey
September	The Weeknd	Daniel Jackson
October	Matt Damon	Lachlan Bailey
November	Will Smith	Renell Medrano
December/January	Tom Holland	Sharif Hamza
December/January	Giannis Antetokounmpo	Arnaud Pyvka
December/January	Lil Nas X	Pari Dukovic

=== 2022 ===
Issue	Cover model	Photographer
February	Stephen Curry	Shaniqwa Jarvis
February	Mohamed Salah	Fanny Latour-Lambert
February	Shohei Ohtani	Eli Russell Linnetz
March	Robert Pattinson	Jack Bridgland
April	Nicolas Cage	Jason Nocito
May	Future	Gregory Harris
June/July	Bad Bunny	Roe Ethridge
August	Brad Pitt	Elizaveta Porodina
September	Charles Leclerc & Carlos Sainz	Jack Bridgland
September	Jacob Elordi	Eli Russell Linnetz
October	Alexandria Ocasio-Cortez	Cruz Valdez
November	Christian Bale	Gregory Harris
December/January	Brendan Fraser	Andreas Laszlo Konrath
December/January	Zoë Kravitz	Steven Klein
December/January	Max Verstappen	Mikael Jansson

=== 2023 ===
Issue	Cover model	Photographer
February	Deion Sanders	Adrienne Raquel
February	Derek Jeter	Danielle Levitt
February	Allen Iverson	Daniel Jackson
March	Jeremy Strong	Gregory Harris
April/May	Tim Cook	Mark Mahaney
April/May	Donald Glover	Fanny Latour-Lambert
April/May	HoYeon Jung	Elizaveta Porodina
April/May	Yohji Yamamoto	Gareth McConnell
Summer	Ryan Gosling	Gregory Harris
September	Pharrell Williams	Fanny Latour-Lambert
October	Chris Evans	Stevie Dance
November	Timothée Chalamet	Cass Bird
December/January	Travis Scott	Jack Bridgland
December/January	Jacob Elordi	Jack Bridgland
December/January	Kim Kardashian	Jack Bridgland

=== 2024 ===
Issue	Cover model	Photographer
February	Barry Keoghan	Jason Nocito
March	Cillian Murphy	Gregory Harris
April/May	Lewis Hamilton	Campbell Addy
April/May	Hunter Schafer	Bryce Anderson
April/May	Danny McBride	Roe Ethridge
April/May	Trent Reznor & Atticus Ross	Danielle Levitt
Summer	Kevin Costner	Fanny Latour-Lambert
September	George Clooney & Brad Pitt	Sølve Sundsbø
October	Beyoncé	Bryce Anderson
November	Paul Mescal	Daniel Jackson
December/January	Dwayne Johnson	Eli Russell Linnetz
December/January	John Mulaney	Eli Russell Linnetz
December/January	Pharrell Williams	Eli Russell Linnetz

=== 2025 ===
Issue	Cover model	Photographer
February	Novak Djokovic	Gregory Harris
March	Michael B. Jordan	Jack Bridgland
April/May	Ben Affleck	Gregory Harris
Summer	Brad Pitt	Nathaniel Goldberg
Summer	Damson Idris	Nathaniel Goldberg
Summer	Lewis Hamilton	Nathaniel Goldberg
September	Travis Kelce	Ryan McGinley
October	Glen Powell	Bobby Doherty
November	Shai Gilgeous-Alexander	Jason Nocito
December/January	Stephen Colbert	Tyrell Hampton
December/January	Sydney Sweeney	Tyrell Hampton
December/January	Seth Rogen	Tyrell Hampton
December/January	SZA	Tyrell Hampton
December/January	Oscar Isaac	Tyrell Hampton
December/January	Clipse	Tyrell Hampton
December/January	Hailey Bieber	Tyrell Hampton

=== 2026 ===
Issue	Cover model	Photographer
March	BTS	Dukhwa Jang
April/May	Jay-Z	Rashid Johnson
Summer	Matt Damon	Alex Prager
Summer	Robert Pattinson	Alex Prager
Summer	Tom Holland	Alex Prager
September	Jeremy Strong	David Luraschi
October	Tom Cruise	Mario Sorrenti
November/December	Chris Rock	Richard Burbridge
November/December	Andrew Garfield	Richard Burbridge
November/December	Matt Damon	Richard Burbridge

== See also ==
- List of people on the cover of GQ Russia
