= Jim Nelson (editor) =

American magazine editor

- Born: March 8, 1963 (age 63); Cheverly, Maryland, U.S.
- Known for: Editor-in-chief of GQ
- Partner: John Mario Sevilla

Jim Nelson (born March 8, 1963) is an American journalist, known for his tenure as editor-in-chief of the magazine GQ.

== Early career ==
Nelson began his journalism career in television, first working as a producer and writer at CNN and later moving to Hollywood where he worked briefly as a writer's assistant on television sitcoms.

He made the shift to magazines at age thirty, starting with an internship at Harper's Magazine, from 1994 to 1997 Nelson was an editor at Harper’s Magazine under Lewis Lapham, where he was responsible for the magazine's Readings section. His writing has also appeared in The New York Times Magazine, Gourmet, and Food & Wine. His own writing for GQ was cited in The Best American Sports Writing in 2001.

== GQ ==
Nelson is the former editor-in-chief of GQ, a position he held from 2003–2018. Nelson joined the magazine as a senior editor in 1997, editing the work of such writers as Andrew Corsello, Elizabeth Gilbert, Charles Bowden, and Michael Paterniti. After working under Art Cooper as an executive editor, Nelson was appointed by Condé Nast to replace him as editor-in-chief in 2003.

In October 2010, Nelson was the editor-in-chief when GQ published a highly controversial cover and photo spread featuring Corey Monteith, Lea Michele, and Dianna Agron from the television show Glee. While Monteith was fully clothed in all the photos, Michele and Agron were in extremely sexually suggestive photos within a high school setting such as lockers and a gym. ABC News noted "There's little question that the photos, one of which shows Michele spread-eagle on a locker-room bench in her panties, are meant to capitalize on the classic school-girl fantasy." Melissa Henson, then director of communications and public education for the Parents Television Council said "The intent, I think, is clearly to fetishize high school girls, and that is what I think is so troubling about that photo shoot." The Parents Television Council President Tim Winter said: "It is disturbing that GQ, which is explicitly written for adult men, is sexualizing the actresses who play high school-aged characters on 'Glee' in this way... Sadly, this is just the latest example of the overt sexualization of young girls in entertainment." The NPR culture critic Linda Holmes described the images: "the women are half-naked, while the man (Cory Monteith, who plays Finn) is fully clothed; and (2) Monteith is possessively palming both of their behinds simultaneously. It makes them submissive to him, which they aren't on the show." Additionally, one photo "features Lea Michele in a shirt, underwear, and knee socks -- and sucking on a lollipop" while, in another, Michele "spreads her legs as wide as she can while pulling at her hair in a gesture that conveys childishness." As editor-in-chief, Nelson deflected the criticism by focusing on the actors’ actual ages (Michele and Nelson were 24, Monteith was 30) instead of the creative design, fashion choices, and poses in the photos of the magazine he ran.

Over the course of Nelson's 15 years at the helm, the magazine was nominated for sixty-four National Magazine Awards and won for reporting, design, photography, general excellence, the highest honor in the industry, as well as twice in the feature writing category. The November 2017 cover of GQ featuring LeBron James won Best Sports and Fitness cover. The 2017 Men of the Year cover featuring Colin Kaepernick as Citizen of Year won the Reader's Choice for Most Controversial cover. In 2018, Rachel Kaadzi Ghansah's feature, A Most American Terrorist: The Making of Dylann Roof, which appeared in the September 2017 issue of GQ, won a Pulitzer Prize for Feature Writing.

GQ has been nominated for forty-three James Beard Awards and has won for restaurant reviews and critiques, distinguished food writing, writing on wine spirits or beer, and humor. In 2016 The Daily Front Row's fourth annual Fashion and Media Awards honored Jim Nelson with the Magazine of the Year award for GQ. In 2017 Ad Age named GQ a magazine of the year honoree. Adweek also named GQ "hottest men's magazine" in 2017.

In 2016, Nelson launched ‘The Closer with Keith Olbermann,’ a twice-weekly web series offering political commentary on the 2016 election and other timely news topics. After garnering more than 75 million views for ‘The Closer,’ Olbermann returned with a post-election series on GQ.com called ‘The Resistance’ where he continued the conversation about President Trump. The series ended in 2017.

Additionally, during Nelson's time at the magazine, a number of GQ stories have become both small and large-scale film productions and TV series, including Concussion starring Will Smith, the Netflix series Last Chance U and the film Only the Brave. In 2017, NBC optioned a sitcom based on GQ editor Dan Riley's feature, Inside the Church of Chili’s. GQ's webseries, Most Expensivest, was also sold to Viceland.

In 2017, Nelson was tapped to host an episode of the PBS icon series, Speakeasy, in which he interviewed punk rock legend, Nick Lowe. He also spoke at length on the evolution of GQ and the enduring importance of long-form journalism on the Longform Podcast.

Nelson resigned in 2018 and was succeeded by Will Welch.

== Personal life ==
Nelson graduated from the University of Notre Dame with a B.A. in American Studies.

== See also ==
- Editorial board
- Fashion editor
- LGBT culture in New York City
- List of LGBT people from New York City
- Literature review
- New Yorkers in journalism
- NYC Pride March
