= Adam Baidawi =

Australian editor and journalist

- Born: 1990 (age 35–36); Abu Dhabi, United Arab Emirates
- Education: Royal Melbourne Institute of Technology
- Known for: Global Editorial Director of GQ
- Spouse: Alex Marxsen

Adam Baidawi is an Australian writer, editor, and photographer, who is the Global Editorial Director at GQ.

== Professional life ==
Earlier in his career, Adam Baidawi worked as an Australia Correspondent for The New York Times, where he reported on stories including the trial against Catholic cardinal George Pell and Australia's legalization of same-sex marriage.

Baidawi first joined GQ as a freelance writer for the Australian edition of the magazine. In 2011, he completed work experience at British GQ, where he “transcribed interviews, did research, stacked magazines and spent an afternoon washing dishes in the kitchen.” In 2018, Baidawi became the editor-in-chief of GQ Middle East, launching the title as GQ’s youngest-ever editor. In 2019, GQ Middle East partnered with UN Women to raise awareness of issues faced by women to its predominantly male audience. That same year, Baidawi was made Deputy Global Editorial Director at GQ globally by Will Welch and in 2021 named Head of Editorial Content at British GQ.

Baidawi was awarded Young Writer of the Year at the Mumbrella 2017 Publish Awards in Australia for his reporting from Pyongyang, New York and Parliament House.

== Personal life ==
Baidawi was raised in Australia by Iraqi parents.
