= Antonio Broccoli Porto =

American painter (born 1955)

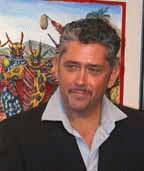
- Born: Antonio Broccoli Porto; September 19, 1955 (age 70); New York City, New York, U.S.
- Education: Iona College, New Rochelle, New York
- Known for: Painting and sculpting
- Awards: UNESCO Medal (December 2000); 2nd Prize in the Graphics Category at the "El Dia Nacional del Artista Pintor Puertorriqueño" (Annual National Day of the Puerto Rican Artistic Painter) (December 2001).

Antonio Broccoli Porto (Note: In this Spanish name, the first or paternal surname is Broccoli and the second or maternal family name is Porto.) (born September 19, 1955) is an American artist, visual artist and sculptor.

== Early years ==
Broccoli Porto's father was an Italian national and his mother's family, Porto, claim Puerto Rican heritage, having originally settled in the town of Cayey. His parents met and married in New York City where Broccoli Porto was born. As a child, he became interested in art and his artistic talents were appreciated by both his family and teachers alike. After he received his primary and secondary education he enrolled and entered Iona College, New Rochelle, New York. There he took up fine art studies and earned a B.A. degree in Arts.

== First art exhibition ==
In May 1979, he held an art exhibition in the Thomas Payne Museum of New Rochelle, New York, as part of a Nationally accredited Honors Program Thesis entitled "Historical Landscapes". In the 1980s, he traveled to Italy and continued his artistic studies at the "Accademia di Belle Arti Brera" (Brera Academy of Fine Arts) in Milan. The artist has a dual citizenship, that of Italy and the United States.

When he returned to New York, he studied two years of Latin percussion at the Harbour Conservatory located in "El Barrio" of Manhattan. Influenced by his great love of Puerto Rican culture, Broccoli Porto moved to Puerto Rico and enrolled in "La Liga de Arte" (League of Art) in San Juan. He also studied for three years at "Escuela de Artes Plasticas" (School of the Plastic Arts) located in Old San Juan. There he took art courses on painting and sculpture. Broccoli Porto had as professors Eric Lluch, an understudy of Andy Warhol and Master Sculptor José Garcia Campos, who would be of great influence in his metal works. Puerto Rican music became an important part of his life and is reflected in his art. A large amount of his collection is made up of musical themes interpreted through the plastic arts. Professor Judy Betts (a renowned writer and Watercolorist from Louisiana, U.S.) served as a great influence his use of blends and transparencies in watercolour paintings, for which he is well known. Broccoli Porto eventually decided to use his maternal surname, Porto, as his artist signature because of its ties to the island of Puerto Rico.

Broccoli Porto was a member of The Association of Watercolorists of Puerto Rico (AAPR) for more than 8 years and served for a brief period as Vice President of that organization. He is listed with the Instituto de Cultura Puertorriqueña (Puerto Rican Institute of Culture) as a Puerto Rican visual artist and sculptor. He is an active member of the UNESCO Artists of Puerto Rico.

== Honors and awards ==
In June 1999, Juan Carlos Morales, director of the Spanish version of William Shakespeare's A Midsummer Night's Dream, presented at Bellas Artes de Guaynabo, Puerto Rico, commissioned Broccoli Porto for the Caribbean Version set and costume designs. He was awarded a UNESCO Medal in December 2000. In December 2001, he won a 2nd Prize in the Graphics Category at the "El Dia Nacional del Artista Pintor Puertorriqueño" (Annual National Day of the Puerto Rican Artistic Painter). His painting, Madonna Saurie, graces the cover of the novel The "Princess Papaya" by Cuban American author, Himilce Novas, which was released on September 30, 2004, by Arte Publico Press, of the University of Houston, Texas. In 2009 Porto was awarded the Brother Loftus, Alumnus of the Year for his achievements in the arts at his alma mater, Iona College, New Rohelle, NY.

== Featured works ==
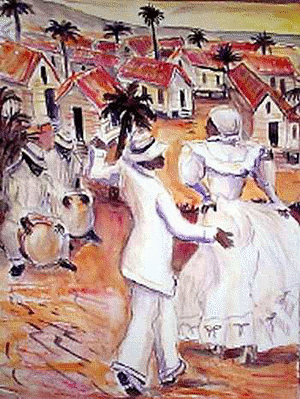
Baile de Loiza Aldea by Antonio Broccoli Porto

Broccol Porto's works have been featured in the following:

- The set design of the International cable television show on Lifetime TV, "The Division".
- In February, 2000, at the Gallery BAI, a private Gallery in The Guggenheim Museum, Soho.
- "El Maravilloso Mundo de la Santería", a documentary on Afro-Caribbean diaspora, by Metropolitan Films, 2000, a Galavisión presentation
- The Television Documentary "Bomba y Plena de Puerto Rico" aired on New Jersey Network's "Imagines" on November 20, 2002.
- The Muestra Nacional de Artes Plasticas, Instituto de la Cultura Puertorriqueña, from September to December in 2003 in the Old San Juan Princessa Museum.
- His Sculptures and Paintings were exhibited in the inauguration of "Casa del Presidente" (UNITEC) for El Museo de Aguadilla y el Caribe.
- "Bomba, a Celebration of Sight and Sound", on November 12, 2005, at Montclair State University in New Jersey, in celebration of Diversity Week.
- "Bomba, a Celebration of Sight and Sound", at Essex Community College in Newark, New Jersey.
- Broccoli Porto was the ARTNOIR'S Magazine "Feature Artist of The Month". His painting "El Bombero" was acclaimed by ARTNOIR.

Broccoli Porto's works were published in "Libro de Arte Iberoamericano Contemporaneo" (Book of Art of Contemporary LatinAmerica) an art encyclopedia of Latin American artists published by AT Cultura of Córdoba, Argentina. In October 2009-January 2010, his one man show, Mendigando Amor Flamenco, was presented at Museo de los Pocéres, Cabo Rojo, P.R. In June 2012, Porto's one man show Bomba was presented at Rio Penthouse Gallery in New York City.

Some of his works are found at:

- The Puerto Rico Tourism Bureau in San Juan, Puerto Rico.
- Museo del Niño (Children's Museum) in Old San Juan, Puerto Rico.
- R-G Premier Bank Headquarters in Hato Rey, Puerto Rico.
- The Carnegie Library in Old San Juan, Puerto Rico.
- El Museo de Nuestra Raiz Africana (The Museum of our African Roots) in Old San Juan, Puerto Rico.
- La Fortaleza (The Governor's Palace) San Juan, Puerto Rico.
- Searle Pharmaceuticals Headquarters in Caguas, Puerto Rico.
- Executive Suites of San Juan Intercontinental Hotel, Isla Verde, Puerto Rico.
- Hyatt Cerromar Dorado Hotel.
- Nueva Esperanza Community Museum, Philadelphia, Pennsylvania.
- Montclair State University, George Segal (artist) Museum
- Fundación Rafael Cepeda, Santurce Puerto Rico

Amongst the notable personalities who own works of art by Broccoli Porto are: Puerto Rican actress and singer Ruth Fernández, actress and singer Jennifer Lopez, Italian singer Laura Pausini, Brazilian Diva, Gal Costa, queen of Bosa Nova, Giorgio Starassoldo Graffenberg of Strassoldo of Italy and former Puerto Rican governor Sila M. Calderón.

== Currently ==
Broccoli Porto together with two other Puerto Rican artists (Mariestella Colón Astacio and Estefan Gargost) were chosen as representatives of contemporary Puerto Rican art for the "Libro de Arte IberoAmericano Contemporaneo" (Book of Latin-American Contemporary Art) written by Dr. María Elena Troncoso and Ricardo Cesar Lescano Grosso . The book, which is Encyclopedic Text of Latin American Artists, was published in Cordoba, Argentina on September 14, 2005, by ATCultura publishers. Currently, Broccoli Porto has moved back to New York and lives and maintains his studio, "Art Studio Porto", in East Patchogue NY.

== See also ==
- List of Puerto Ricans
