= Joseph Akel =

New Zealand journalist

Joseph Akel, is a New Zealand journalist, previously serving as the executive editor/art director of magazine V from 2016 to 2017, editor-in-chief/creative director of L'Officiel USA from 2017 to 2019, and most recently was the Global Vice President (Creative) at Esprit. Akel is based in New York City.

== Career ==
Akel began his career in 2012 as co-founding editor and art curator at Man of the World. He joined V and VMAN in 2016 as executive editor and art director. Akel exited V and VMAN in 2017 to become the editor-in-chief of L'Officiel USA. In March 2019, he joined the global editorial committee of L'Officiel alongside Jennifer Eymère (Creative Director, L'Officiel), and Giampietro Baudo (editor-in-chief, L'Officiel Italia). Akel exited the magazine in Autumn 2019.

In July 2020, Akel was appointed to the role of perspectives editor at Wellington-based Stuff. In October 2020, Akel joined Banana Republic as Editorial Director, rising to the position of Senior Creative Director in 2021. Then joining Esprit in 2022 as Global Vice President of Creative. In 2024, he exited Esprit.

Media offices
Preceded by Himilce Novas	Editor-in-Chief of L'Officiel USA; 2018–2019	Succeeded by Peter Davis
