= Doug Inglish =

American photographer

Doug Inglish is an American photographer mostly known for his celebrity and portrait photography.

== Career ==
Doug's editorial clients include America, Arena, Arena Hommes Plus, Big, BlackBook Magazine, Crash, Dazed & Confused, Details, Doing Bird, GQ Style, Harper's Bazaar, InStyle, Interview, Jane, Pop, Russian Vogue, Teen Vogue, V, VMan, Vanity Fair, Out, Electric Youth Magazine, and Hercules Magazine.

He has photographed celebrities including Adrian Grenier, Jessica Biel, Camilla Belle, Dennis Quaid, Don Cheadle, Zooey Deschanel, Minnie Driver, David Duchovny, Aaron Eckhart, Matthew Fox, Ryan Gosling, Daryl Hannah, Emile Hirsch, Jewel, Hugh Laurie, Lisa Loeb, Rose McGowan, Hunter Parrish, Pedro Pascal, Elsa Pataky, Jaime Pressly, Emilie de Ravin, Leelee Sobieski, Steven Strait, Amber Tamblyn, Aimee Teegarden, Harry Treadaway, Luke Treadaway, Nadine Velazquez, Kevin Zegers, James Franco, and Logan Lerman.
