= L'Officiel USA =

American fashion magazine

- Cover of the February/March 2018 issue, Lana Del Rey by Mick Rock
- Editor-in-Chief: Caroline Grosso
- Categories: Fashion
- Frequency: Bimonthly
- Publisher: Dr. Feridun Hamdullahpur
- Founder: Evan Katz
- First issue: September 1976; 49 years ago
- Company: L'Officiel U.S.A. Associates (1976–1980); Éditions Jalou (2017–2022); The Generation Essentials Group (2022–present)
- Country: United States
- Based in: New York City

L'Officiel USA (French pronunciation: [lɔfisjɛl]; stylised in all caps), is an American bimonthly fashion magazine that covers haute couture, ready-to-wear fashion, beauty, popular culture, design, and jewellery. Since 2022, Caroline Grosso has served as editor-in-chief, previous editors include Himilce Novas and Joseph Akel, among others.

Based in the Chelsea neighbourhood of New York City, L'Officiel USA began publication in 1976 as the first international edition of the French fashion magazine L'Officiel.

== Background ==
L'Officiel USA is the American edition of French fashion magazine L'Officiel. It was founded in 1976 by Evan Katz and was the first international edition of L'Officiel. In 1980, the magazine ceased publication, returning to print in 2018.

The magazine is a bimonthly publication published seven times per year.

=== Editors ===
Editor	Start year	End year	Ref.
Original (1976–1980)
Dorothy Coleman Seeman	1976	1979	
Himilce Novas	1979	1980	
Revival (2017–present)
Joseph Akel	2018	2019	
Peter Davis	2019	2020	
Caroline Grosso	2022	present	

== History ==
L'Officiel USA (stylised as L'Officiel/U.S.A.) was launched in 1976 as the first international edition of L'Officiel, The magazine was edited by Dorothy Coleman Seeman. Evan Katz was the owner and publisher, by its second issue the magazine had a subscriber count of 124,000.

For the 1976 debut an advertising campaign featuring the endorsement of American model Marisa Berenson ran in WWD. In 1977, an advertising campaign was produced featuring the members of the Joffrey Ballet committee (Sally Brayley, Geraldine Stutz, Mrs. B. Duke Glenn, Mrs. John G. Ward, Charlotte Ford, Susan Brody, Isabelle Leeds, Christine Biddle, and Susan Fine) and publisher Evan Katz.

In 1979, Seeman she was replaced by Himilce Novas, whom had been called "terrific" by Diana Vreeland.

In July 1980, co-publisher F. Philip Slater (previously of Town & Country) and five other employees were let go due to the early 1980s recession, Katz attempted to find financing or a buyer for the magazine.

L'Officiel/U.S.A. would cease publication with the August 1980 issue. At the time the magazine had a circulation of 140,000.

Ideal Publishing announced on 19 March 1981 that the magazine would return from September as a bi-monthly. On 20 March 1981, Evan Katz, ex-publisher and owner of L'Officiel in the United States, disputed their claims and stated that he still held the rights to the L'Officiel name and that Ideal never been in contact with him or Éditions Edouard Max Brunhes. When The New York Times asked Ideal's chairman Seymour L. Butan if he had contacted the French publisher he answered, ''I don't have to tell you anything.''

Rumours of an American L'Officiel relaunch would persist throughout the 2000s, however, it wasn't until 2017 that the magazine was revived.

In 2017, L'Officiel USA launched on digital platforms led by Joseph Akel with funding from Global Emerging Markets, the first print edition was released in February 2018. The magazine is based in New York City.

Peter Davis, replaced Akel as editor-in-chief in 2019. Davis would exit the magazine at the end of 2020.

In December 2021, the City of New York brought an action against L'Officiel USA Inc. under the Freelance Isn't Free Act, claiming that the magazine had failed to pay freelance contributors. A settlement was reached in July 2023 with L'Officiel agreeing to pay 41 freelancers US$275,000.

After the role of editor was left vacant for nearly two years, Caroline Grosso was appointed editor-in-chief of L'Officiel USA in August 2022. Grosso previously served as the global head of content projects and fashion initiatives for L'Officiel, prior to joining L'Officiel she was the digital fashion director at W.

== Editions ==
- L'Officiel USA (from September 1976 to August 1980 and since February 2018)
- L'Officiel Hommes USA (since September 2020)
- L'Officiel Art USA (from December 2020 to April 2023)

== See also ==
- List of L'Officiel USA cover models
- L'Officiel, Original French edition in publication since 1921
