= Arnaldo Anaya-Lucca =

Puerto Rican fashion photographer

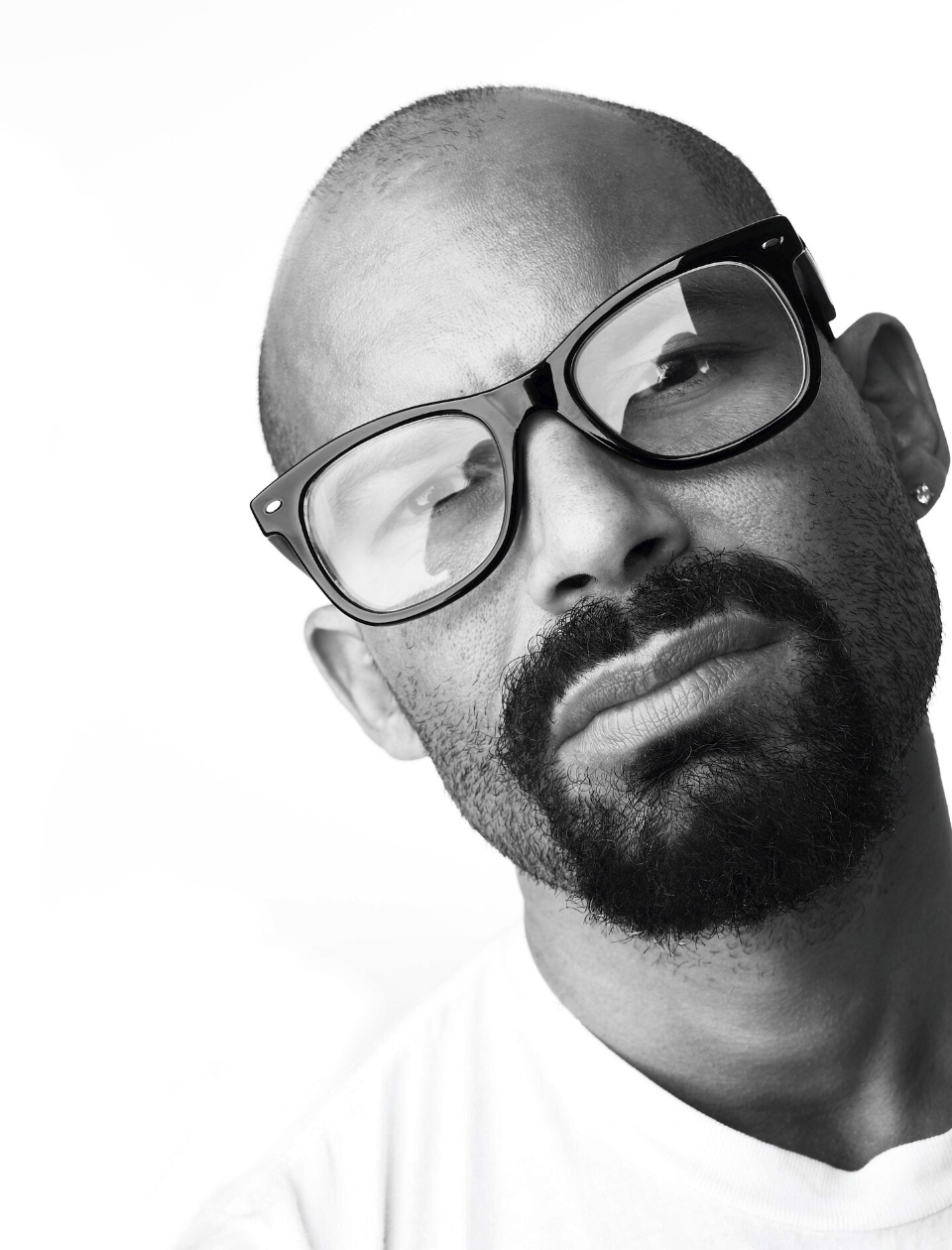
Anaya-Lucca in 2010

Arnaldo Anaya-Lucca (born 30 November 1961) is a Puerto Rican fashion photographer. After earning a BBA degree, he left the corporate world, establishing himself in the fashion industry through his work with the Ralph Lauren Corporation. He has shot for many clients, magazines covers and editorials, and has also worked with celebrities and models.

== Background ==
Anaya-Lucca was born in Ponce, Puerto Rico. His father, Dr. Candido Anaya, is a cardiologist. His mother, Rev. Nilda Lucca-Anaya, is an episcopal minister. They had five children, including two sets of identical twin boys, of which Arnaldo is one. The fifth child was a girl. Anaya-Lucca's twin brother, Ariel Anaya, is younger by five minutes. His siblings, the twin boys, and the girl are older by five and two years respectively.

Anaya-Lucca came to the United States in 1974, at the age of 13. His father wanted his sons to speak English and experience the change of seasons, so he sent them to St. John's Military School in Salina, Kansas. By the age of 18, Arnaldo had already discovered a passion for photography. However, his father insisted he continued with his studies, pursuing photography only as a hobby. Anaya-Lucca attended Rockhurst College in Kansas City, Missouri, and received his Bachelor of Business Administration in Finance and Economics in 1983. Following graduation, he moved to Washington, D.C., where he worked as a junior Auditor at the Internal Revenue Credit Union for three months.

In 1986, after losing his job in D.C., Anaya-Lucca went on a trip to London. An unexpected layover at Newark Liberty International Airport necessitated his spending a night in New York City. On impulse, he stayed in the city without ever returning to DC—except to remove his belongings. Since then, he has lived in the East Village of NYC where he is represented by Defacto Inc.

== Career ==
In 1988, Anaya-Lucca took a job as a salesman in the Men's Clothing Department at the Ralph Lauren flagship store in New York. Working his way up the company ladder, he eventually joined the men's design team in 1992. In 1995, the advertising department hired him as Director of Visual Concepts. He assisted the ad team and lead photographer Bruce Weber in developing campaign concepts for advertising shoots and campaigns. In 1995, after Mr. Lauren saw Arnaldo's portraits of his son Andrew Lauren, Ralph himself hired Arnaldo to shoot Tyson Beckford for the launch of their high end brand, Purple Label. That was Anaya-Lucca's first assignment as a professional photographer and his first published photograph.

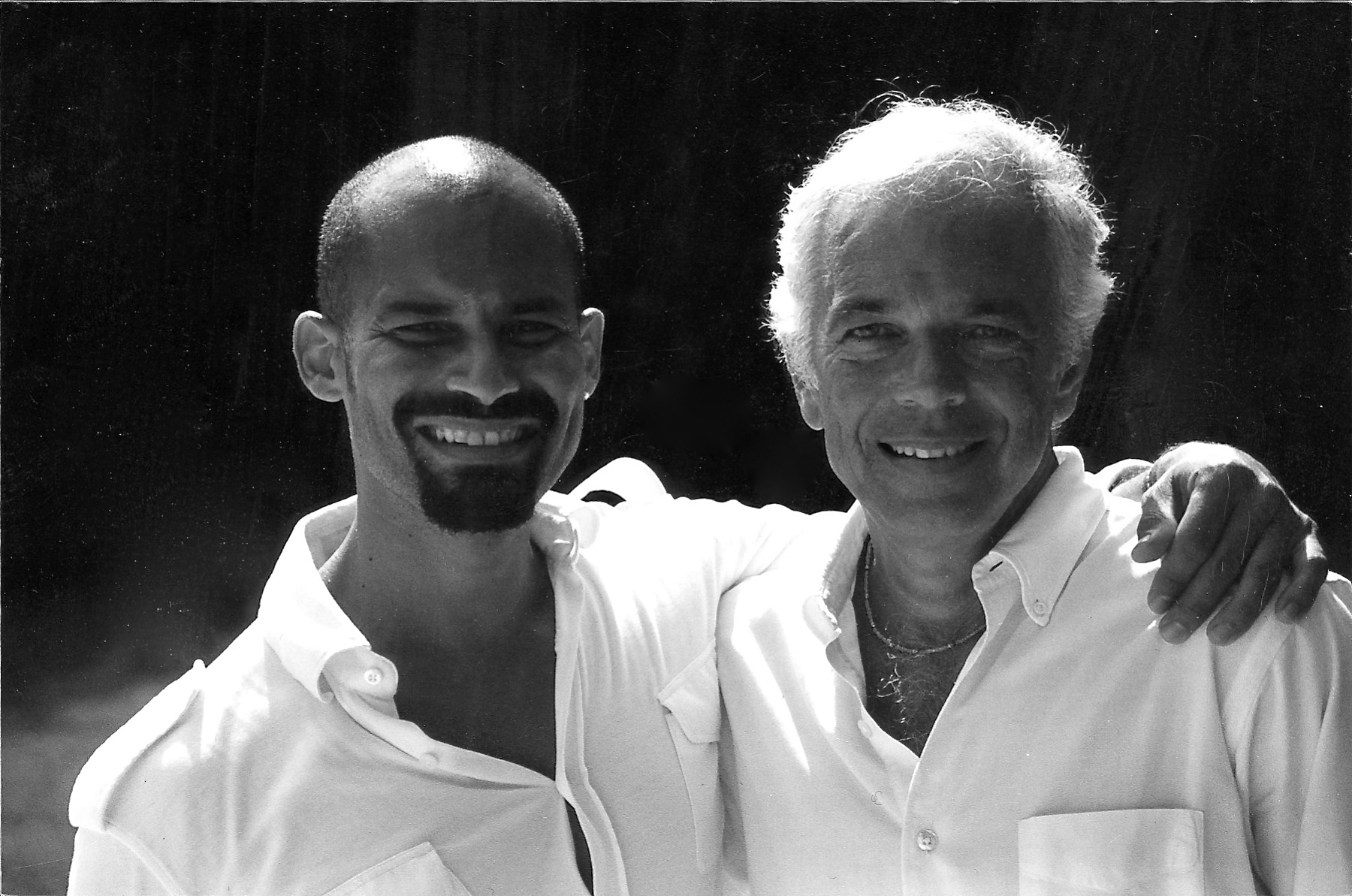
Anaya-Lucca (left) with fashion designer Ralph Lauren in 2013

Anaya-Lucca left the Ralph Lauren Corporation in 1997 to pursue a career in fashion photography. He began to shoot campaigns for "Polo Ralph Lauren" in 2002.

Anaya-Lucca has contributed to magazines including: Vogue Australia, Australian, American, French, German and Russian editions of GQ, Esquire, Interview, Out, Black Magazine, The New York Times Magazine, Spanish Harper's Bazaar, Flaunt, Brutus, Casa, Dutch, Vibe, Dsection magazine and Velour Magazine.

In addition to his long-term work for Ralph Lauren, Anaya-Lucca's other clients include: Calvin Klein, Emporio Armani, Brooks Brothers, Nautica, Kohl's, FAO Schwarz, Victoria's Secret, Lord & Taylor, Gap, Louis Boston, Bloomingdales, Wormland, Saks Fifth Avenue, Oxford Clothes, Oscar de la Renta, Barry Bricken, Country Road, Joseph Abboud, Bergdorf Goodman, Hickey Freeman, Faconnable, Marks and Spencer, JC Penney and Hugo Boss.

Some of the models he has photographed are: Sean O'Pry, Garrett Neff, River Viiperi, David Gandy, Gabriel Aubry, Alex Lundqvist, Nacho Figueras, Oriol Elcacho and Oliver Cheshire as well as Valentina Zelyaeva, Bridget Hall, Joan Smalls, Behati Prinsloo, Filippa Hamilton, Magdalena Frackowiak, Alessandra Ambrosio, Candice Swanepoel, Bekah Jenkins and Emily DiDonato.

=== Gallery of models ===
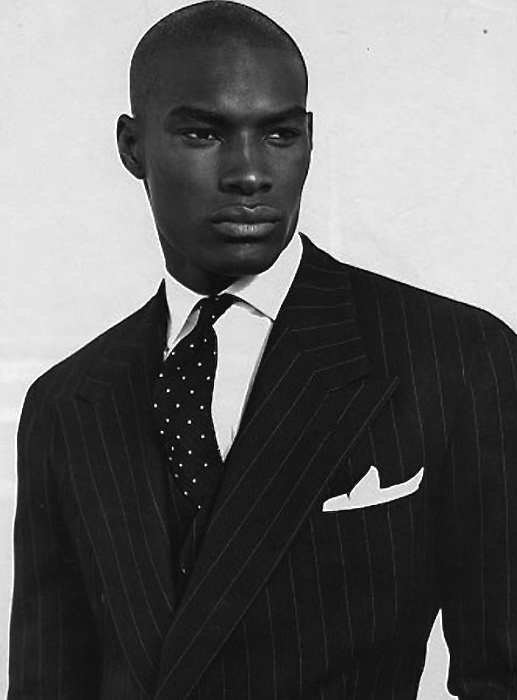
Tyson Beckford for Ralph Lauren Purple Label (1995)

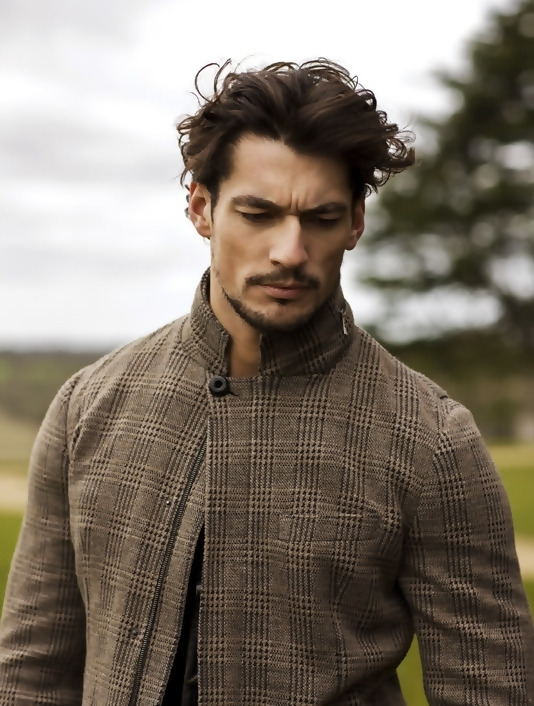
David Gandy for GQ Japan (2009)

== Special projects ==
In December 2009, Anaya-Lucca was featured in a solo art exhibition, "Adam and Eve", in the Luis Perez Galeria in Miami, Florida. Ralph Lauren was the official designer of the uniforms and clothing worn by the U.S. Team at the 2012 Summer Olympics. Anaya-Lucca was hired to shoot the special "Olympic Edition of the Ralph Lauren Label" which featured Ryan Lochte, Jonathan Horton and other athletes. In August 2012, Complex magazine named Anaya-Lucca one of "The 50 Greatest Fashion Photographers Right Now".
