= Will Welch (editor) =

American magazine editor

- Born: 1981 (age 44–45); Atlanta, Georgia, U.S.
- Education: Columbia University (BA)
- Known for: Editor-in-chief of GQ
- Spouse: Heidi Smith

Will Welch (born 1981) is an American magazine editor and writer, who is currently the global editorial director at GQ and editor-in-chief of GQ U.S.

== Biography ==
Welch was born in Atlanta and grew up in Buckhead. His mother was a clerk for Georgia State Supreme Court, and his father was a lawyer. He attended The Westminster Schools, graduating in 1999. For college, he moved to New York City to attend Columbia University, where he majored in English and graduated in 2003. In college, he interned for WKCR-FM.

He began his journalism career at the New York-based music magazine The Fader, where he wrote Kanye West's first cover story and profiled musicians such as The White Stripes and Jerry Garcia. He was eventually promoted to deputy editor of the magazine. He also worked one night a week as a bartender to make ends meet.

Welch joined GQ magazine in May 2007 as an associate editor after he was approached by Adam Rapoport. He was promoted to senior editor in 2012, style editor in 2014, and named editor-in-chief of its spinoff, GQ Style in 2015. His own profiles included André 3000, designer Christophe Lemaire, and Ram Dass.

In 2018, Welch was named creative director of GQ, and in September 2018, was named editor-in-chief of GQ U.S., succeeding Jim Nelson. Under Welch's helm, the magazine underwent a stylistic overhaul by placing less emphasis on articles and increasing its online presence including website, social media accounts and video features. His first six months of editorship saw a significant increase in the magazine's site engagement, online-related revenue, and advertising.

As editor-in-chief, Welch also began to redefine the 88-year old magazine. He championed the concept of "New Masculinity" and explored of how traditional notions of masculinity are being challenged, evolved, and overturned. GQ had since then featured a number of celebrities, including Brad Pitt, Pharrell Williams, and Robert Pattinson, in cover shoots that defy gender stereotypes. He also said that the magazine has been moving from giving general style advice to offering examples of self-expression.

In December 2020, Welch was promoted to global editorial director of GQ. He is also a producer for the upcoming Warner Bros. movie The Great Chinese Art Heist, directed by Jon M. Chu. In July 2023, GQ removed a previously published story critical of Warner Bros. Discovery CEO David Zaslav after representatives for the studio complained to Welch.

On January 6, 2026, Welch announced that he would be stepping down as editor in order to work with Pharrell Williams in Paris.
