= VMan =

American men's fashion magazine

- VMAN Summer 2009 cover
- Categories: Fashion magazine
- Frequency: Quarterly
- Founded: 2003
- Company: Visionaire
- Country: United States
- Based in: New York City
- Language: English
- Website: www.vman.com
- ISSN: 1546-0835

VMan is a magazine featuring men's clothing published as an offshoot of V magazine.

== History and profile ==
VMan was established in 2003, and is published quarterly by Visionaire Publishing, also responsible for V and Visionaire. Joseph Akel served as executive editor from 2016 to 2017.
