= Art Cooper =

American magazine editor (1937–2003)

Arthur Cooper (October 15, 1937 – June 9, 2003) was an American journalist and magazine editor, the longtime editor of GQ.

== Life and career ==
Cooper was born in New York City and educated at Pennsylvania State University. In 1964, he became a reporter at The Harrisburg Patriot; he was later a correspondent for Time and from 1967 to 1976 was an editor and cultural critic at Newsweek, then from 1976 to 1978 edited Penthouse. In 1978, he became editor of Family Weekly, and then in 1983, of GQ, where his first cover featured Joe Theismann. He announced his retirement in February 2003.

At both Family Weekly and GQ Cooper was known for nurturing writers. He broadened the scope of GQ, which had been focused on fashion. He was named Adweek magazine's editor of the year in 1985, was nominated for 27 National Magazine Awards and won three, was inducted into the American Society of Magazine Editors Hall of Fame in January 2003, and was given the Henry Johnson Fisher Lifetime Achievement Award the following month. Under him GQ was the first of a new wave of men's lifestyle magazines, and Cooper himself became a fashion leader.

== Personal life and death ==
Cooper was Jewish. He was married to Amy Levin Cooper, who became editor of Mademoiselle; Condé Nast, the publisher of their two magazines, had previously had a policy against nepotism.

In June 2003, shortly after his retirement, he suffered a stroke at The Four Seasons Restaurant in Manhattan while lunching with David Zinczenko, the editor of Men's Health, and died four days later at age 65 at New York Hospital.
