= Himilce Novas =

Cuban-American novelist, journalist, and human rights activist

Himilce Novas (born 1944 in Havana, Cuba) is a Cuban-American novelist, historian, journalist and human rights activist. Novas served as the editor-in-chief of L'Officiel USA from 1979 to 1980.

== Early life ==
Novas was born in Havanna, Cuba in 1944. In 1960, her family fled to the United States. Novas was educated in New York City, where she has spent most of her life.

== Career ==
Novas’ career spans several decades and encompasses works of fiction and non-fiction. Her published work includes poetry, plays, novels, reference books, and a cookbook about Latin American cuisine. She began her writing career as a teenager, when Nobel Prize laureate Camilo José Cela published her poems in his literary journal, Papeles de son Armadans. Later, she worked as a journalist, magazine editor and publicist for Vanidades, The New York Times, The Connoisseur, The Christian Science Monitor, and other publications.

As a human rights activist, Novas was an early member of the National Organization for Women. She continues to work on behalf of women and those in the GBLT community and was featured in the book Feminists Who Changed America, 1963–1975 (2006). She has served on the board of Veteran Feminists of America. As a public speaker and visiting professor at educational institutions such as Wellesley College, the University of California, Santa Barbara, and Clark University, Novas has specialized in a wide range of topics, including her own fiction and non-fiction works, Latino culture, feminism, and Gay and Lesbian history and culture. She served as feature editor for The Multicultural Review.

In the late 1990s, Novas hosted 'The Novas Report' on KQSB 990-AM in Santa Barbara.

In 2011, Himilce Novas was the recipient of a National Women's Political Caucus “Women of Courage” Award.

== Selected bibliography ==
=== Novels ===
- Mangos, Bananas and Coconuts: A Cuban Love Story (1996) ISBN 1-55885-092-9
- Princess Papaya (2005) ISBN 1-55885-436-3

=== Non-fiction ===
- Everything You Need to Know About Latino History (1994;2003;2008) ISBN 978-1-4295-8826-3
- Remembering Selena: A Tribute in Pictures and Words/Recordando Selena: Un tributo en palabras y fotos (with Rosemary Silva, 1995) ISBN 0-679-44408-4
- Latin American Cooking Across the USA (with Rosemary Silva, 1997) ISBN 0-679-44408-4 (trans. La Buena Mesa, 1997)
- The Hispanic 100: A Ranking of the Latino Men and Women Who Have Most Influenced American Thought and Culture (1995) ISBN 0-8065-1651-8
- Passport Spain: Your Pocket Guide to Spanish Business, Customs & Etiquette (with Rosemary Silva, 1997) ISBN 1-885073-35-6
- Everything You Need to Know About Asian American History (with Lan Cao, 2004) ISBN 0-452-28475-9

Media offices
Preceded by Dorothy Coleman Seeman	Editor-in-Chief of L'Officiel USA; 1979–1980	Succeeded by Joseph Akel
