= Art Streiber =

- Born: United States
- Known for: Photography

Art Streiber is an American photographer known in particular for his portraits of entertainment and sports personalities. His images are widely published and range from a portrait of actor-comedian Seth Rogen as the Cary Grant character in the plane scene in the Alfred Hitchcock classic North by Northwest, which Streiber shot for Vanity Fair, to a nude group shot of the Women's U.S. Water Polo team for the cover of the 2010 "The Body Issue" of ESPN The Magazine, the cast of the ABC sitcom Modern Family for a triple cover of Entertainment Weekly, and a re-creation of a scene from The Grapes of Wrath featuring the cast of the movie Taking Woodstock, also for Vanity Fair.

In 2010, Streiber shot Wired magazine's first motion cover, featuring comedian Joel McHale. And in 2012, Paramount Pictures commissioned him to shoot a portrait of 116 actors, actresses, directors, and executives affiliated with the studio, a historic image that was featured in Vanity Fair and covered by broadcast outlets such as CBS News.

Streiber also has photographed behind the scenes at the Academy Awards every year since 2000, except for 2009.

Streiber studied at Stanford University, graduated in 1984, and has been based in his hometown of Los Angeles since 1994. He is a regular contributor to the major Hollywood studios and networks, having shot posters and related promotional collateral for ABC, CBS, NBC, HBO, MTV, Universal Studios, DreamWorks, and Sony Pictures. Between 2000 and 2010 alone, he has shot the posters for The 40-year-Old Virgin, Knocked Up, I Love You, Man, A Mighty Wind, Arrested Development, Big Love, Hung, Bones, Desperate Housewives, and Harry Loves Lisa, among many others.

Streiber has photographed such diverse figures as Neil Patrick Harris, Academy Award–winning director Kathryn Bigelow, T. Boone Pickens, Floyd Mayweather, Anderson Cooper, Bono, Jay Leno, Steven Spielberg, and Jodie Foster.

In 2005, American Photo magazine named him one of the "100 Most Important People in Photography," and in 2008, the Pacific Design Center in California presented Streiber with the Star of Design Award for photography. He lectures and teaches frequently, including at the Julia Dean Photo Workshops in California and at PDN's PhotoPlus Expo.
