= Myles Loftin =

American photographer

- Born: January 27, 1998 (age 28); Accokeek, Maryland, U.S.
- Education: Parsons School of Design
- Occupations: photographer and artist

Myles Loftin (born January 27, 1998) is an American photographer and artist based in Brooklyn, New York.

== Early life and education ==
Loftin was born on January 27, 1998, in Accokeek, Maryland. Loftin grew up with a younger sister J’adore, and is of African-American descent. His mother, Tammy McBride-Loftin, is an IT project manager. His father, Patrick Loftin, is a sales manager who grew up between Virginia and Washington D.C.

During Middle and High School Loftin began sharing his photography work on social media platforms like Tumblr and Instagram, and eventually began to build a community and a following online. In 2016, Loftin moved to New York City and began pursuing a degree in photography at Parsons School of Design. During his junior year of undergrad he headed to the UK to continue his studies at the London College of Communication. In 2020, he graduated with his BFA in photography from Parsons School of Design.

== Career ==
In 2017, Myles produced a multimedia project known as HOODED. The objective of this project was in humanizing and decriminalizing the societal image of black men dressed in hoodies.

In May 2020, Myles collaborated with Luis Velo for the virtual exhibition SYNTAX. Loftin was named one of 2020's "30 Under 30" in the category of "Art and Style" by Forbes. During 2020 he also joined Giant Artists, a production and artist management agency based in Los Angeles that exhibited his artwork.

In 2021, his work was showcased by Aint – Bad, a publisher of contemporary art. His covered black queer people. Loftin photographed black queer people both in public and intimate settings performing everyday tasks showing collective life experiences of the queer populace.

Loftin’s photographs have been exhibited in New York, Los Angeles and Washington D.C.

== Personal life ==
Myles identifies as a queer man. He currently lives in Brooklyn, New York.
