= V (American magazine) =

American fashion magazine

- Cover of the November–December 2013 issue, featuring Winona Ryder
- Editor: Stephen Gan
- Categories: Fashion magazine
- Frequency: Bimonthly
- First issue: 1999
- Company: Visionaire
- Country: United States
- Based in: 95 Rivington Street, New York, NY 10002
- Language: English
- Website: www.vmagazine.com
- ISSN: 1539-185X

V is an American fashion magazine published since 1999. The magazine is printed seasonally and highlights trends in fashion, film, music and art. A men's fashion quarterly entitled VMan started as an offshoot in 2003.

== History ==
V was launched in September 1999 as the "younger sibling" publication to the limited-edition quarterly Visionaire. V releases six issues a year, one for each current seasonal collection; Spring, Spring/Summer, Summer, Fall Preview, Fall, and Winter. The magazine had a readership of 315,000 as of 2010.

V is edited by Stephen Gan and features new global fashion displayed through shoots and editorials focusing more specifically on art, film, music and fashion. V has been noted for its inventive and progressive styling, as well as its reportage of cultural figures and global youth culture. Past contributors have included Inez van Lamsweerde and Vinoodh Matadin, Hedi Slimane, Mario Testino, Mario Sorrenti, and Karl Lagerfeld. Interview subjects have included Joan Didion, Salman Rushdie, Robert Altman, Brooke Shields, and Norman Mailer. Icons in fashion, film, music and art to grace the cover include Madonna, Katy Perry, Mariah Carey, Rihanna, Naomi Campbell, Jennie, Grace Jones, Brad Pitt, Britney Spears, Lisa, David Bowie and Lady Gaga.

In 2005, 7L and Steidl published the book V Best: Five Years of V Magazine, chronicling the first five years of the publication. Included are fashion articles, photos, interviews and more from the first five years of V.

In 2016, Lady Gaga was invited to be the guest editor for V for its 99th issue, which features a record-setting sixteen different covers.

In March 2016, it was revealed that Britney Spears was selected to appear on the cover of the magazine for its 100th issue. Spears shot three different covers for the milestone issue with photographer Mario Testino. From 2016 to 2017, Joseph Akel served as Executive Editor and Creative Director of the magazine.

In August 2019, American singer and songwriter Billie Eilish was selected to appear on the 20th anniversary issue, V121, interviewed by Pharrell Williams.

In April 2020, V released its "Supermodel Summer" issue, selecting 15 of fashion's newest models to grace the cover, including Kaia Gerber, Grace Elizabeth, Adut Akech, Lila Moss, and more.

In July 2020, American model Gigi Hadid collaborated with V on a limited-edition art book titled Gigi Journal: Part II, presenting a medley of 32 exclusive art pieces from around the world, derived from over 20,000 submissions, which reflected experiences in quarantine during the COVID-19 pandemic and the resurgence of the BlackLivesMatter movement. The book featured hand-painted cover art, created by Hadid herself, and written contributions from leaders in the racial-justice movement.

In November 2020, ahead of the US elections, V released V127: The "Thought Leaders" Issue, featuring 45 subjects such as Bella Hadid, Mariah Carey, Taylor Swift, Chris Evans, Jaden Smith, Jennifer Lawrence, and more. Photographed entirely by Dutch fashion photography duo Inez van Lamsweerde and Vinoodh Matadin, the subjects featured within the issue spanned culture, art, and politics, speaking to the American people to exercise their right to vote. A sequel to the V127 voting initiative introduced 10 additional subjects such as Hailey Bieber, John Legend, Lee Daniels, Lily Aldridge, Maxwell, Quannah Chasinghorse, and more for digital covers to encourage Americans to vote in the Georgia Senate runoff elections.

In April 2021, V collaborated with French fashion house CHANEL to create a limited-edition art book titled The Chanel Book, featuring cover stars Lily-Rose Depp, JENNIE, and Margot Robbie. Captured entirely by photographers Inez van Lamsweerde and Vinoodh Matadin in Los Angeles, New York, Mexico and virtually in Korea, a mix of talents ranging from fashion, music, art, literature, and politics all wore CHANEL's Spring-Summer 2021 Ready-To-Wear collection throughout.

In May 2021, V digitally revived the defunct Spanish division of the publication, Spanish V, for a one-time return with a digital issue showcased on their website. Featuring the cast of HBO Max's Spanish biographical series Veneno, the digital issue was released for free on V's website.

In June 2021, V collaborated with Spanish denim brand Lois Jeans for a line of sustainably made jeans and introduced the collection on the cover of their V131 Fall Preview issue with subjects such as Emily Ratajkowski, Ashley Graham, Hailey Bieber, Eileen Gu, and more.

In October 2021, American musician and actress Madonna was selected to appear on the cover of V's V133 Winter issue in an homage to Marilyn Monroe and Bern Stern's "The Last Sitting", photographed by Steven Klein. The issue went on to become one of the publication's fastest selling issues.

In May 2022, Brazilian fashion model Gisele Bündchen officially made her return to fashion modeling on the cover of V's V136 Summer issue.

Throughout the years, the magazine has continued to expand its print and digital footprint. In addition to the bimonthly print issues, V has released limited-edition monthly calendars, created in collaboration with fashion houses such as GCDS, Guess, Emporio Armani, and EA7. The magazine has collaborated with Parisian luxury house Au Depart for a monogram patterned, magazine slip, sold exclusively on V's shopsite. The magazine has also launched its first podcast in 2021, V Wanna Know, which focuses on the concept of having celebrity guests connect with a specialist in an area of interest of the guest's choosing. Some of music, fashion, and the internet's biggest names such as Madison Beer, Finneas, King Princess, Emma Chamberlain, Nicole Richie, Tinashe, Banks, 24kGoldn, and more have joined the podcast.

== On the cover ==
Some of the celebrities that have been featured on the cover of V Magazine include Britney Spears, Lady Gaga, Lana Del Rey, Selena Gomez, Justin Bieber, Madonna, Katy Perry, Mariah Carey, Christina Aguilera, Gwen Stefani, Janet Jackson, Miley Cyrus, Gwyneth Paltrow, Cameron Diaz, Winona Ryder, Rihanna, Kesha, James Franco, David Beckham, Natalie Portman, Dakota Fanning, Kirsten Dunst, Kristen Stewart, Jennifer Connelly, Swerve Strickland, Nicki Minaj, Lisa, Kanye West, Orlando Bloom, Demi Moore, Tam Nakano, Beyoncé, Jennie, Adriana Lima, Dave Meltzer, Marc Jacobs, Salma Hayek, Celine Dion, Dua Lipa, Zack Sabre Jr. and more.

== Criticisms ==
The January 2010 issue of V entitled "The Size Issue" featured a variety of plus sized models. This edition printed two different covers, one with plus sized Precious star Gabourey Sidibe, while the other featured the petite actress Dakota Fanning. One criticism of the issue argues that the magazine's intentions were to juxtapose big and small as in a competition with one another. However, others "embraced the magazine's bold statement" and commended V on its efforts to "modernize the beauty standard".

== Features ==
In the September 2008 issue of American Photo Magazine, British photographer Nick Knight was featured for the photo spread "Wildflowers" that he shot for the March 2008 issue of V.

In June 2017, V Magazine featured band Monotronic as the music behind a VTV summer swimwear feature.

== Associated technologies ==
The V website consists of multiple different navigational links such as; blog, magazine, fashion, articles, photo and video. The website contains features from the current issue as well as extras and exclusive outtakes that did not get put into the final printing of the magazine. Other interactive technological features on V’s website include the magazine's Twitter, Facebook, Instagram, YouTube pages.

== VMan ==
VMan magazine featuring men's clothing is an offshoot of V. Established in 2003, it is published quarterly by Visionaire Publishing, also responsible for V and Visionaire.

== See also ==
- Vogue
