= Tasha Tilberg =

Canadian fashion model (born 1979)

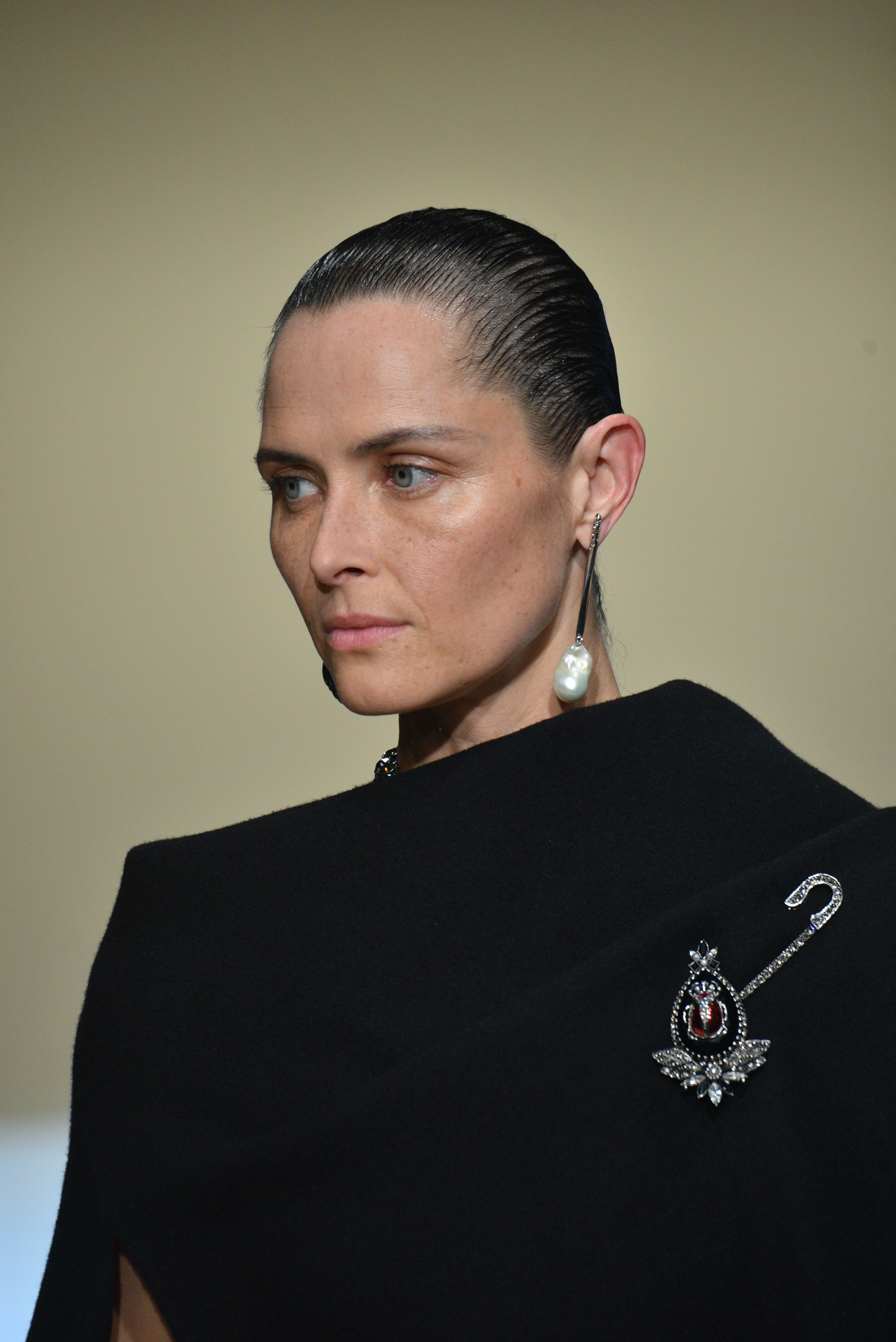
- Tilberg in 2018
- Born: August 26, 1979 (age 47); Chilliwack, British Columbia, Canada
- Children: 3
- Modeling information
- Height: 1.76 m (5 ft 9 in)
- Hair color: Brown
- Eye color: Blue/Green
- Agency: The Management NYC (New York); Oui Management (Paris); d'management group (Milan); Select Model Management (London); Uno Models (Barcelona); Iconic Management (Hamburg); Modellink (Gothenburg); Lizbell Agency (Vancouver)

Tasha Tilberg (born August 26, 1979, in Chilliwack, British Columbia) is a Canadian fashion model.

== Modeling ==
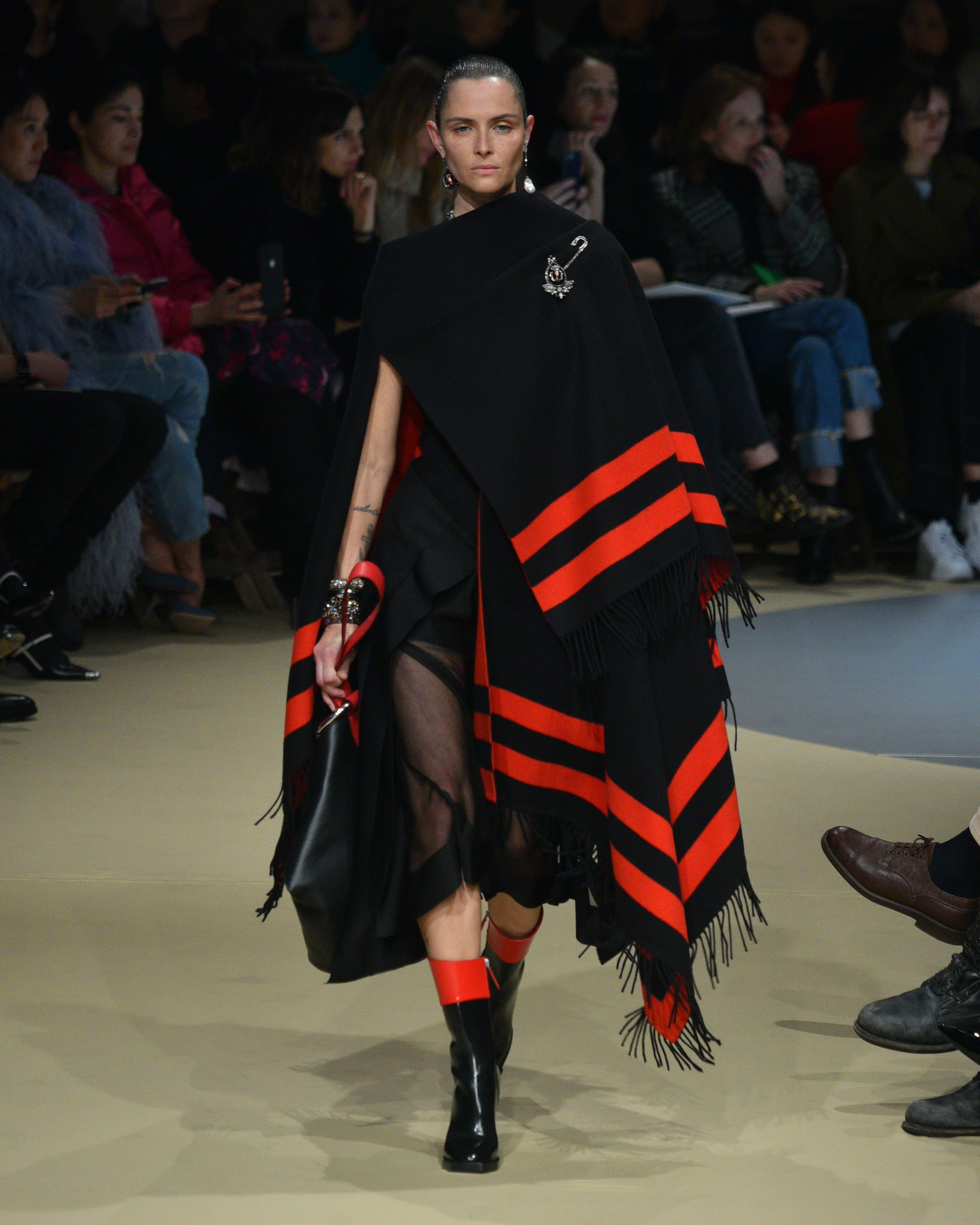
Tilberg at the Alexander McQueen Fall Winter 2018 runway

Tilberg has appeared in advertisements for Alberta Ferretti, Bloomingdale's, Comma, Fendi, Esprit, Gucci, Mango, Missoni, Moschino, Versace and Versus, and she has walked in fashion shows for, among others, Alessandro Dell'Acqua, Anna Molinari, Balenciaga, Blumarine, Dolce & Gabbana, DKNY, Fendi, Versace, Genny, Iceberg, Jil Sander, Les Copains, Marc by Marc Jacobs, Missoni, Moschino, Narciso Rodriguez, Rifat Ozbek, Richard Tyler, Sportmax, Victor Alfaro, Versus, Isabel Marant, Miu Miu and Yohji Yamamoto. She has appeared in Mademoiselle, Vogue, W, ELLE, Harper's Bazaar, Marie Claire and Flare, and was a spokesmodel for CoverGirl.

== Personal life ==
Tasha has twins, a boy and a girl, called Bowie and Gray respectively, to whom she gave birth in late 2012, and her third child in 2020.
