= Nigel Parry =

British-American photographer

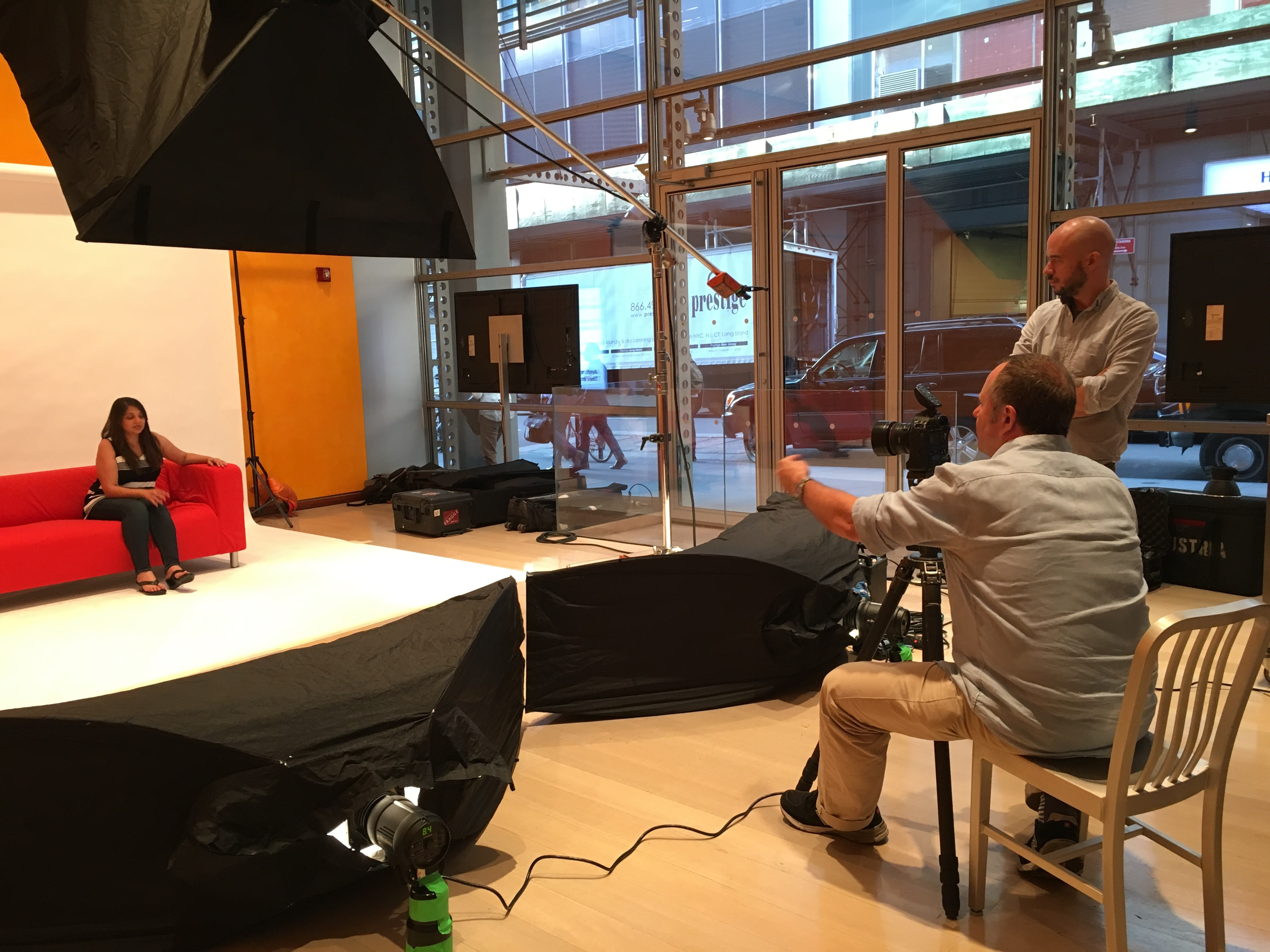
- Nigel Parry behind the camera, taking photos of subjects on the Flipboard couch at Social Media Weekend 2016 in New York City
- Born: 1961; London
- Website: www.nigelparryphoto.com

Nigel Parry is a New York-based photographer of celebrities, who started his career in London in 1987 and moved to New York in 1994. His work has been seen in magazine features, such as Elle, InStyle, Vanity Fair, Men's Health and Maxim. His clients further include major movie and music companies, including 20th Century Fox, Buena Vista Pictures, Sony Music and Bad Boy Records.

Parry’s work is recognized for its clarity, intimacy, and narrative depth. He has received awards from the European Magazine Awards, ASME Portrait Award, Hasselblad Masters, Communication Arts, Graphis, PDN, the Art Directors Club, International Photography Awards, and American Photography. His photographs are held in the permanent collection of the National Portrait Gallery.

He also produces meditative landscape photography, emphasizing light, texture, and mood, and has published the monographs Sharp, Precious, Blunt, and A Journey of Smiles.

== Publications ==
- Nigel Parry: Sharp (2000)
- Nigel Parry, Melanie Dunea: Precious (2004)
- Nigel Parry: Blunt (2006)
