= Michael Thompson (photographer) =

American photographer

Michael Thompson is an American photographer who began his career as an assistant to Irving Penn after training at the Brooks Institute of Photography in California. His father was a studio photographer in Washington State. Thompson's photography has appeared in W, Details, Allure, Harper's Bazaar, Vogue, Vanity Fair, GQ and The New York Times Magazine. His commercial photography includes campaigns for Gap, Elizabeth Arden, Chanel, and the PDN Award winner "I Am African." His commercials include those for the fragrance "Lovely" by Sarah Jessica Parker (winner of the 2006 FiFi Award for Best National Advertising Campaign -Television), the "Frank Gehry Collection" for Tiffany, and a PSA for "The American Ballet Theatre."

Thompson lives and works in New York.

== Books ==
- Images ISBN 0810955830 Publisher: Harry N. Abrams (February 1, 2005)
- Portraits
- Red Nude
