= Quil Lemons =

American photographer

Quil Lemons (born 1997) is an American photographer. His work has been exhibited at the Philadelphia Museum of Art and the International Center of Photography. In 2021, he became the youngest person to photograph the lead image used on the cover of Vanity Fair.

== Early life and education ==
Lemons grew up in South Philadelphia. He attended the Charter High School for Architecture and Design in Philadelphia and The New School in New York.

== Career ==
In 2017, Lemons released a photo series called GlitterBoy. His photographs have been featured in publications including The New York Times, Variety, and Vogue. Lemons' photograph of Billie Eilish was used on the March 2021 cover of Vanity Fair, making him the youngest person ever to photograph the magazine's cover image. He was the photographer for the advertising campaign of the Savage X Pride Collection celebrating LGBT Pride from Rihanna's Savage X Fenty fashion label.

Lemons was included in the book The New Black Vanguard: Photography Between Art and Fashion by Antwaun Sargent.

== Exhibitions ==
- 2018: Detour, Philadelphia Museum of Art
- 2021: David H. Koch Theater, American Ballet Theatre
- 2021-2022: INWARD: Reflections on Interiority, International Center of Photography

== Personal life ==
Lemons lives in Brooklyn, New York.
