= GQ =

American monthly men's fashion magazine

- October 2017 cover featuring Harrison Ford and highlighting the magazine's 60th year
- Editor-in-chief: Adam Baidawi
- Categories: Men's
- Frequency: 6 issues per year
- Publisher: Condé Nast
- Total circulation: 934,000 (2019)
- First issue: 1931 (as Apparel Arts); 1957 (as Gentleman's Quarterly); 1967 (as GQ)
- Company: Advance Publications
- Country: United States
- Based in: New York City
- Language: Chinese, English, French, German, Italian, Japanese, Korean, Polish, Portuguese, Spanish
- Website: gq.com; gq-magazine.co.uk; gq-magazin.de; gq.co.za; gqthailand.com; gqmagazine.fr; gq.com.au; gq.com.cn; gqindia.com; gqitalia.it; gqkorea.co.kr; gq.com.mx; gq.pl; gqjapan.jp; revistagq.com; gq.com.tw; gq.globo.com; gqmiddleeast.com
- ISSN: 0016-6979

GQ (short for Gentlemen's Quarterly and previously known as Apparel Arts) is an international monthly men's fashion magazine based in New York City and founded in 1931. The publication focuses on fashion, style, and culture for men, though articles on food, movies, fitness, sex, music, travel, celebrities, sports, technology, and books are also featured.

== History ==
The magazine Apparel Arts was launched in 1931 in the US as a men's fashion magazine for the clothing trade, aimed primarily at wholesale buyers and retail sellers. Initially, it had a very limited print run and was aimed solely at industry insiders to enable them to advise their customers. The popularity of the magazine among retail customers, who often took the magazine from the retailers, spurred the creation of Esquire magazine in 1933.

Apparel Arts continued until 1957, when it was transformed into a quarterly magazine for men, which was published for many years by Esquire Inc. and appeared as a supplement for Esquire subscribers. "Apparel" was dropped from the logo in 1958 with the spring issue after nine issues, and the name Gentlemen's Quarterly was established.

Gentlemen's Quarterly was re-branded as GQ in 1967. The rate of publication was increased from quarterly to monthly in 1970. In 1979, Condé Nast bought the publication, and editor Art Cooper changed the course of the magazine, introducing articles beyond fashion and establishing GQ as a general men's magazine in competition with Esquire.

Nonnie Moore was hired by GQ as fashion editor in 1984, having served in the same position at Mademoiselle and Harper's Bazaar. Jim Moore, the magazine's fashion director at the time of her death in 2009, described the choice as unusual, observing that "She was not from men's wear, so people said she was an odd choice, but she was actually the perfect choice". Jim Moore also noted that she changed the publication's more casual look: "She helped dress up the pages, as well as dress up the men, while making the mix more exciting and varied and approachable for men."

GQ has been closely associated with metrosexuality. The writer Mark Simpson coined the term in an article for British newspaper The Independent about his visit to a GQ exhibition in London: "The promotion of metrosexuality was left to the men's style press, magazines such as The Face, GQ, Esquire, Arena and FHM, the new media which took off in the Eighties and is still growing ... They filled their magazines with images of narcissistic young men sporting fashionable clothes and accessories. And they induced other young men to study them with a mixture of envy and desire." The magazine has expanded its coverage beyond lifestyle issues. GQ has been called the "holy text of woke capital" by The Spectator.

In 2016, GQ launched the spinoff quarterly GQ Style, headed by then-style editor Will Welch, who was later promoted to creative director of the magazine.

In 2018, writing for GQ, Rachel Kaadzi Ghansah won the Pulitzer Prize for Feature Writing for her article about Dylann Roof, who had shot nine African-Americans in a church in Charleston. In September 2018, Will Welch was named the new editor-in-chief of GQ, succeeding Jim Nelson.

In 2020, GQ launched its webstore and first merch drop. The GQ Shop lineup was designed by the editors and art directors behind the GQ website.

== Men of the Year ==
Since 1996, the magazine has hosted the annual GQ Men of the Year awards, an international franchise that recognizes influential figures in culture, entertainment, sports, and style. The honorees, selected by the magazine's editorial boards, are chosen based on their cultural impact and professional achievements during the year. The recognition typically culminates in a high-profile gala and a special commemorative issue.

While the tradition originated with the U.S. edition in 1996, it has expanded to over 20 international editions. This includes launches by GQ Australia in 2007, British GQ in 2009, and GQ India in 2010. Subsequent versions were established in Spain, Brazil, and South Korea, among others.

== Controversies ==
=== Russian apartment bombings ===
GQ's September 2009 U.S. magazine published, in its "backstory" section, an article by Scott Anderson, "None Dare Call It Conspiracy". Before GQ published the article, an internal email from a Condé Nast lawyer referred to it as "Vladimir Putin's Dark Rise to Power". The article reported Anderson's investigation of the 1999 Russian apartment bombings, and included interviews with Mikhail Trepashkin who investigated the bombings while he was a colonel in Russia's Federal Security Service.

The story, including Trepashkin's own findings, contradicted the Russian Government's official explanation of the bombings and criticized Vladimir Putin, the President of Russia.

Condé Nast's management tried to keep the story out of Russia. It ordered executives and editors not to distribute that issue in Russia or show it to "Russian government officials, journalists or advertisers". Management decided not to publish the story on GQ's website or in Condé Nast's foreign magazines, not to publicize the story, and asked Anderson not to syndicate the story "to any publications that appear in Russia".

The day after the magazine's publication in the United States, bloggers published the original English text and a translation into Russian on the internet.

=== Glee controversy ===
In 2010, GQ magazine had three adult members of the television show Glee (Dianna Agron, Lea Michele and Cory Monteith) partake in a photoshoot. The sexualization of the actresses in the photos caused controversy among parents of teens who watch the show Glee. The Parents Television Council was the first to react to the photo spread when it was leaked prior to GQ's planned publishing date. Their president Tim Winter, stated, "By authorizing this kind of near-pornographic display, the creators of the program have established their intentions on the show's directions. And it isn't good for families". The photoshoot was published as planned and Dianna Agron went on to state that the photos did push the envelope, that they did not represent who she is, any more than other magazine photo shoots, but that she was a 24-year-old adult in the photo shoot, and wondered why the concerned parents allowed their eight year old daughters to read any racy issue of the adult magazine GQ.

=== Criticism of the Bible and Western literary canon ===
On April 19, 2018, the editors of GQ published an article titled "21 Books You Don't Have to Read" in which the editors compiled a list of works they think are overrated and should be passed over, including the Bible as well as The Catcher in the Rye, The Alchemist, Blood Meridian, A Farewell to Arms, The Old Man and the Sea, The Lord of the Rings, and Catch-22. The article generated a backlash among Internet commentators.

=== Karol G's photo retouching ===
On April 6, 2023, the Colombian singer Karol G said on social media that the photo used on the cover of an issue of GQ Mexico was "disrespectful" and a misleading depiction of the way her body and face naturally looks. She wrote: "I don't know how to start this message. Today my GQ magazine cover was made public, a cover with an image that does not represent me. My face doesn't look like that, my body doesn't look like that and I feel very happy and comfortable with how I look naturally." "It's disrespectful to me. It's to the women that every day we wake up looking to feel comfortable with ourselves despite society's stereotypes."

== Circulation ==
The magazine reported an average worldwide paid circulation of 934,000 in the first half of 2019, down 1.1% from 944,549 in 2016 and 2.6% from 958,926 in 2015.

According to the Audit Bureau of Circulations (UK), British GQ had an average circulation of 103,087 during the first half of 2019, down 6.3% from 110,063 during the second half of 2018, and down 10.3% from 114,867 during the second half of 2013.

== International editions ==
=== Operating ===
- British GQ (since 1988)
- GQ Japan (since 1993)
- GQ España (since 1994)
- GQ Germany (since 1997)
- GQ Taiwan (since 1997)
- GQ Australia (since 1998)
- GQ Italia (since 1999)
- GQ South Africa (since 1999)
- GQ Korea (since 2001)
- GQ México y Latinoamérica (since 2006)
- GQ France (since 2008)
- GQ India (since 2008)
- 精英 GQ China (2009–2024; since 2026)
- GQ Brasil (since 2011)
- GQ Türkiye (since 2012)
- GQ Thailand (since 2014)
- GQ Middle East (since 2018)
- GQ Hong Kong (since 2025)
- GQ Polska (since 2025)
- GQ Nederland (since 2026)
- GQ Philippines (since 2026)
- GQ Singapore (since 2026)

=== Defunct ===
- GQ Russia (2001–2022)
- GQ Portugal (2001–2025)
- GQ Romania (2009–2015)

== Editors and publishers ==
U.S. publishers

- Bernard J. Miller (1957–1975)
- Sal Schiliro (1975–1980)
- Steve Florio (1975–1985)
- Jack Kliger (1985–1988)
- Michael Clinton (1988–1994)
- Michael Perlis (1994–1995)
- Richard Beckman (1995–1999)
- Tom Florio (1999–2000)
- Ronald A. Galotti (2000–2003)
- Peter King Hunsinger (2003–2011)
- Chris Mitchell (2011–2014)
- Howard Mittman (2014–2017)

U.S. editors

- Everett Mattlin (1957–1969)
- Jack Haber (1969–1983)
- Art Cooper (1983–2003)
- Jim Nelson (2003–2019)
- Will Welch (2019–present)

U.K. editors

- Paul Keers (1988–1990)
- Alexandra Shulman (1990–1992)
- Michael VerMeulen (1992–1995)
- James Brown (1997–1999)
- Tom Haines (1999)
- Dylan Jones (1999–2021)
- Adam Baidawi (2021–present)

== See also ==
- List of men's magazines
  - Men's Vogue
- List of people on the cover of GQ
- List of people on the cover of GQ Russia
