= Borgato =

Borgato is an Italian surname. Notable people with the surname include:

- Agostino Borgato (1871–1939), Italian actor and film director
- Francesco Borgato (born 1990), Italian singer and dancer
- Giada Borgato (born 1989), Italian cyclist
- Giovanni Borgato (1897–1975), Italian footballer
- Luigi Borgato (born 1963), Italian piano maker
