= Forbes list of the world's highest-paid models =

Annual ranking by Forbes magazine

This is a list of the highest-paid models—applicable to either sex— in the world as ranked by Forbes magazine. For measurement, the magazine used pretax earnings, and fees for agents, managers and lawyers are not deducted, based on the report of 2018. The estimated figures are based on interviews with managers, agents, brand executives, and industry experts. Models income came from multiples entries, including endorsements, licensing ventures, runway shows, and commercial catalogs.

The standalone Forbes highest-paid models list existed between 2003 and 2018, although some models made appearances in the broad-general list Celebrity 100 as top model earners, including in 2000 and 2002. The lists are nearly exclusive to female models, as the magazine rarely compiles a list based on male models—the last time being in 2013. (Note: First known lists were made in late 2000s, called "World's Most Successful Male Models".) The modeling industry is a women-dominated sector, one of the few industries where the gender pay gap is reversed, where male models typically earn far less than their counterparts. According to PayScale in 2013, female models had an average salary of $41,300, earning 148% more than male models. By 2008, a successful male model could earn a mid-six-figure range, maxing out around $500,000 a year.

Gisele Bündchen holds the record for the most times being the highest earner (14), the most consecutive times being the highest earner (12), the most times being one of the top 5 earners (19), and the highest annual earnings ($47 million in 2014). Sean O'Pry has the highest annual sum reported by Forbes for a male model ($1.5 million in 2013).

== Highest-paid models by year ==
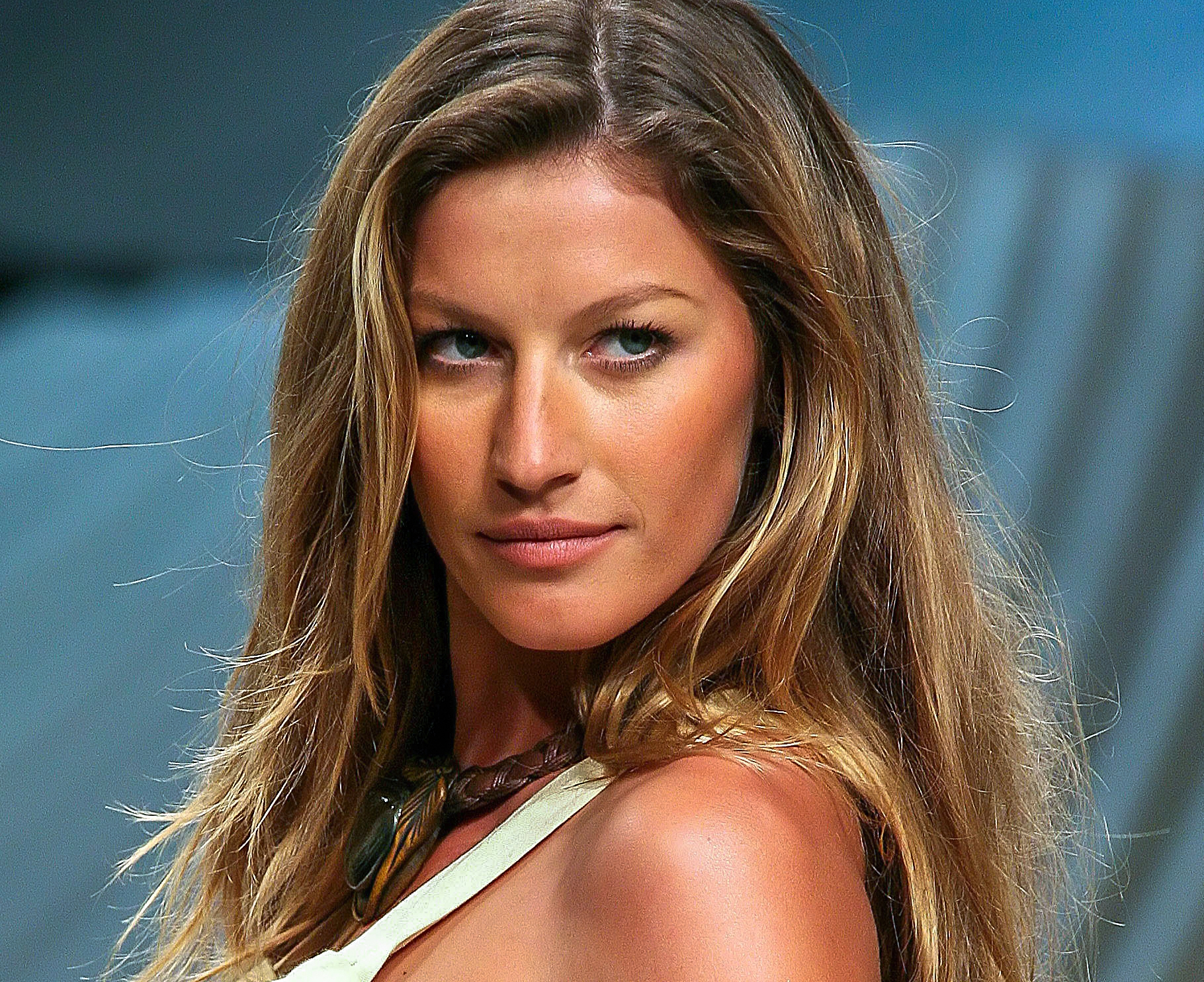
Gisele Bündchen has more appearances within the top five, and on the top.

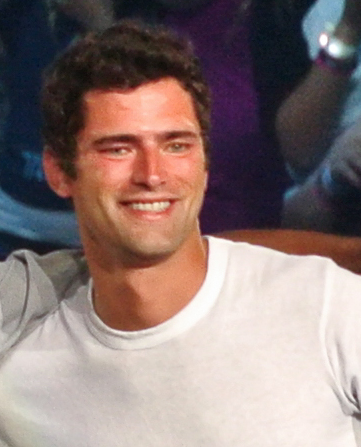
Sean O'Pry became the most "successful" male model on Forbes earning lists

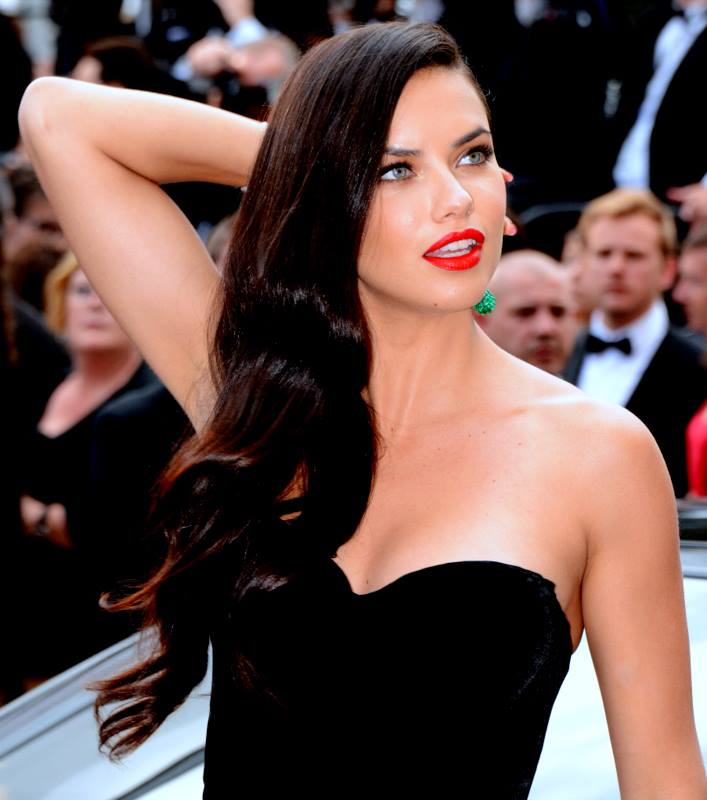
Adriana Lima made at least sixteen appearances in the top five.

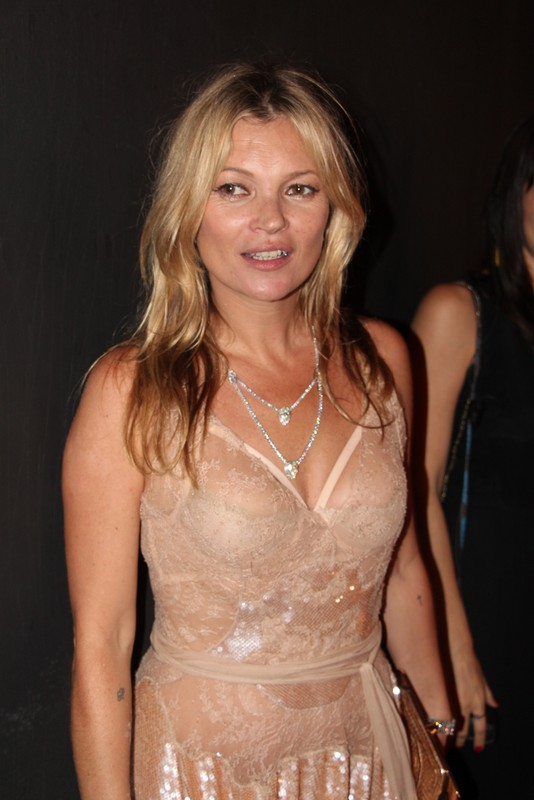
Kate Moss made at least ten appearances in the top five.

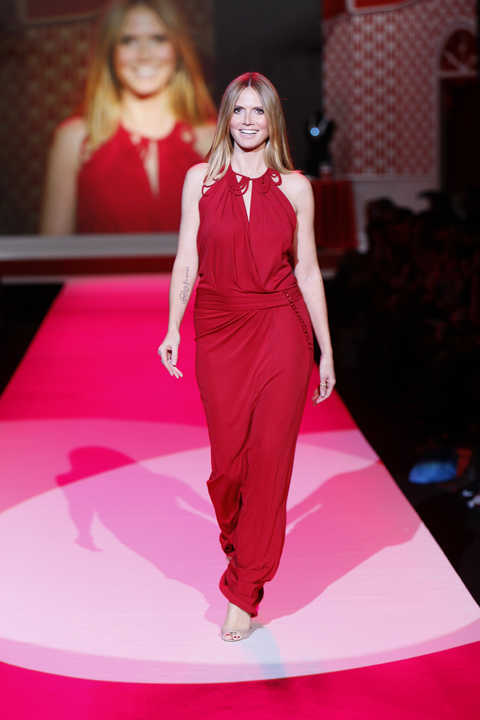
Heidi Klum made at least nine appearances in the top five.

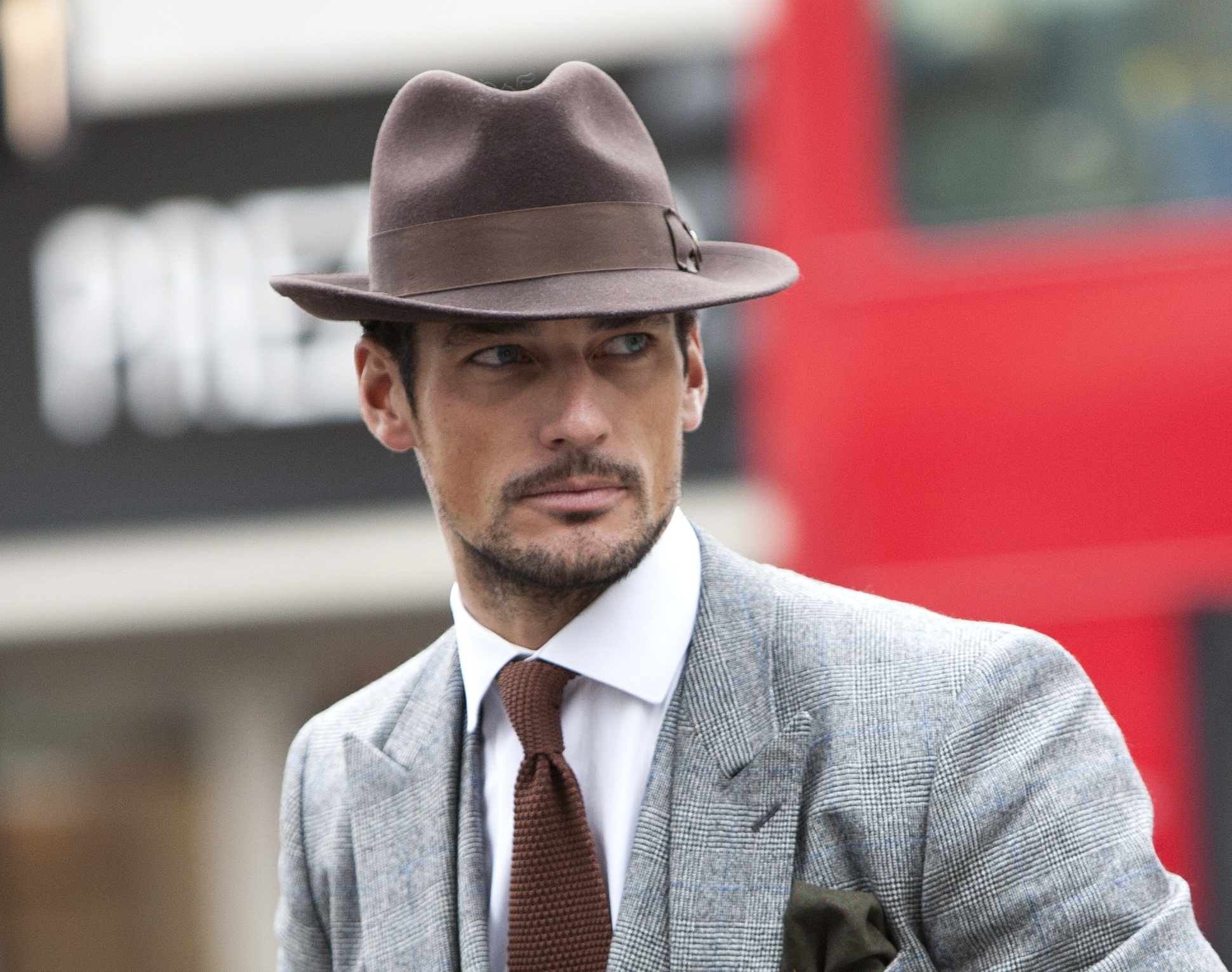
David Gandy is one of the few male models to appear twice in a Forbes-earning list, including the last one dedicated to the subject (2013).

=== 2000 ===
The 2000 list:

Rank	Name	Nationality	Earnings
1	Claudia Schiffer	Germany	$9 million
2	Christy Turlington	United States	$8.5 million
3	Gisele Bündchen	Brazil	$8 million
4	Cindy Crawford	United States	$6.3 million
5	Tyra Banks	United States	$5.5 million

=== 2002 ===
Rank	Name	Nationality	Earnings
1	Gisele Bündchen	Brazil	$12.5 million

=== 2003 ===
The 2003 list:

Rank	Name	Nationality	Earnings
1	Gisele Bündchen	Brazil	$12.8 million
2	Heidi Klum	Germany	$8.2 million
3	Milla Jovovich	Ukrainian SSR	$7.6 million
4	Christy Turlington	United States	$7.2 million
5	Carolyn Murphy	United States	$6.8 million

=== 2004 ===
The 2004 list:

Rank	Name	Nationality	Earnings
1	Milla Jovovich	Ukrainian SSR	$10.5 million
2	Gisele Bündchen	Brazil	$10 million
3	Heidi Klum	Germany	$8 million
4	Carolyn Murphy	United States	$5 million
5	Tyra Banks	United States	$4 million

=== 2005 ===
The 2005 list:

Rank	Name	Nationality	Earnings
1	Gisele Bündchen	Brazil	$15.2 million
2	Heidi Klum	Germany	$7.5 million
3	Tyra Banks	United States	$6 million
4	Kate Moss	United Kingdom	$5 million
5	Adriana Lima	Brazil	$4.5 million

=== 2006 ===
The 2006 list:

Rank	Name	Nationality	Earnings
1	Gisele Bündchen	Brazil	$33 million
2	Kate Moss	United Kingdom	$9 million
3	Heidi Klum	Germany	$8 million
4	Adriana Lima	Brazil	$6 million
5	Alessandra Ambrosio	Brazil	$6 million

=== 2007 ===
The 2007 list:

Rank	Name	Nationality	Earnings
1	Gisele Bündchen	Brazil	$33 million
2	Kate Moss	United Kingdom	$9 million
3	Heidi Klum	Germany	$8 million
4	Adriana Lima	Brazil	$6 million
5	Alessandra Ambrosio	Brazil	$6 million

=== 2008 ===
The 2008 list:

Rank	Name	Nationality	Earnings
1	Gisele Bündchen	Brazil	$35 million
2	Heidi Klum	Germany	$14 million
3	Kate Moss	United Kingdom	$7.5 million
4	Adriana Lima	Brazil	$7 million
5	Doutzen Kroes	Netherlands	$6 million

The 2008 list (male models), also known as "World's Most Successful Male Models" list:

Rank	Name	Nationality
1	Taylor Fuchs	Canada
2	Mathias Lauridsen	Denmark
3	Matt Gordon	Canada
4	Cole Mohr	United States
5	Nick Snider	United States

=== 2009 ===
The 2009 list:

Rank	Name	Nationality	Earnings
1	Gisele Bündchen	Brazil	$25 million
2	Heidi Klum	Germany	$16 million
3	Kate Moss	United Kingdom	$8.5 million
4	Adriana Lima	Brazil	$8 million
5	Doutzen Kroes	Netherlands	$6 million

The 2009 list (male models) also known as "World's Most Successful Male Models" list:

Rank	Name	Nationality
1	Sean O'Pry	United States
2	Matt Gordon	Canada
3	David Gandy	United Kingdom
4	Danny Schwartz	United Kingdom
5	Garrett Neff	United States

=== 2010 ===
The 2010 list:

Rank	Name	Nationality	Earnings
1	Gisele Bündchen	Brazil	$25 million
2	Heidi Klum	Germany	$16 million
3	Kate Moss	United Kingdom	$9 million
4	Adriana Lima	Brazil	$7.5 million
5	Doutzen Kroes	Netherlands	$6 million

=== 2011 ===
The 2011 list:

Rank	Name	Nationality	Earnings
1	Gisele Bündchen	Brazil	$45 million
2	Heidi Klum	Germany	$20 million
3	Kate Moss	United Kingdom	$14.5 million
4	Adriana Lima	Brazil	$8 million
5	Alessandra Ambrosio	Brazil	$5 million

=== 2012 ===
The 2012 list:

Rank	Name	Nationality	Earnings
1	Gisele Bündchen	Brazil	$45 million
2	Kate Moss	United Kingdom	$9.2 million
3	Natalia Vodianova	Russia	$8.6 million
4	Adriana Lima	Brazil	$7.3 million
5	Doutzen Kroes	Netherlands	$6.9 million

=== 2013 ===
The 2013 list:

Rank	Name	Nationality	Earnings
1	Gisele Bündchen	Brazil	$42 million
2	Miranda Kerr	Australia	$7.2 million
3	Adriana Lima	Brazil	$6 million
4	Kate Moss	United Kingdom	$5.7 million
5	Liu Wen	China	$4.3 million

The 2013 list (male models):

Rank	Name	Nationality	Earnings
1	Sean O'Pry	United States	$1.5 million
2	David Gandy	United Kingdom	$1.4 million
3	Simon Nessman	Canada	$1.1 million
4	Arthur Kulkov	Russia	$905,000
5	Noah Mills	Canada	$740,000

=== 2014 ===
The 2014 list:

Rank	Name	Nationality	Earnings
1	Gisele Bündchen	Brazil	$47 million
2	Doutzen Kroes	Netherlands	$8 million
3	Adriana Lima	Brazil	$8 million
4	Kate Moss	United Kingdom	$7 million
5	Kate Upton	United States	$7 million
5	Miranda Kerr	Australia	$7 million
5	Liu Wen	China	$7 million

=== 2015 ===
The 2015 list:

Rank	Name	Nationality	Earnings
1	Gisele Bündchen	Brazil	$44 million
2	Cara Delevingne	United Kingdom	$9 million
3	Adriana Lima	Brazil	$9 million
4	Doutzen Kroes	Netherlands	$7.5 million
5	Natalia Vodianova	Russia	$7 million

=== 2016 ===
The 2016 list:

Rank	Name	Nationality	Earnings
1	Gisele Bündchen	Brazil	$30.5 million
2	Adriana Lima	Brazil	$10.5 million
3	Gigi Hadid	United States	$10 million
4	Kendall Jenner	United States	$10 million
5	Miranda Kerr	Australia	$9 million
5	Karlie Kloss	United States	$9 million

=== 2017 ===
The 2017 list:

Rank	Name	Nationality	Earnings
1	Kendall Jenner	United States	$22 million
2	Gisele Bündchen	Brazil	$17.5 million
3	Chrissy Teigen	United States	$13.5 million
4	Adriana Lima	Brazil	$10.5 million
5	Gigi Hadid	United States	$9.5 million

=== 2018 ===
The 2018 list:

Rank	Name	Nationality	Earnings
1	Kendall Jenner	United States	$22.9 million
2	Karlie Kloss	United States	$13 million
3	Chrissy Teigen	United States	$11.5 million
4	Rosie Huntington-Whitely	United Kingdom	$11.5 million
5	Gisele Bündchen	Brazil	$10 million
5	Cara Delevingne	United Kingdom	$10 million
