= Simon Nessman =

Canadian model

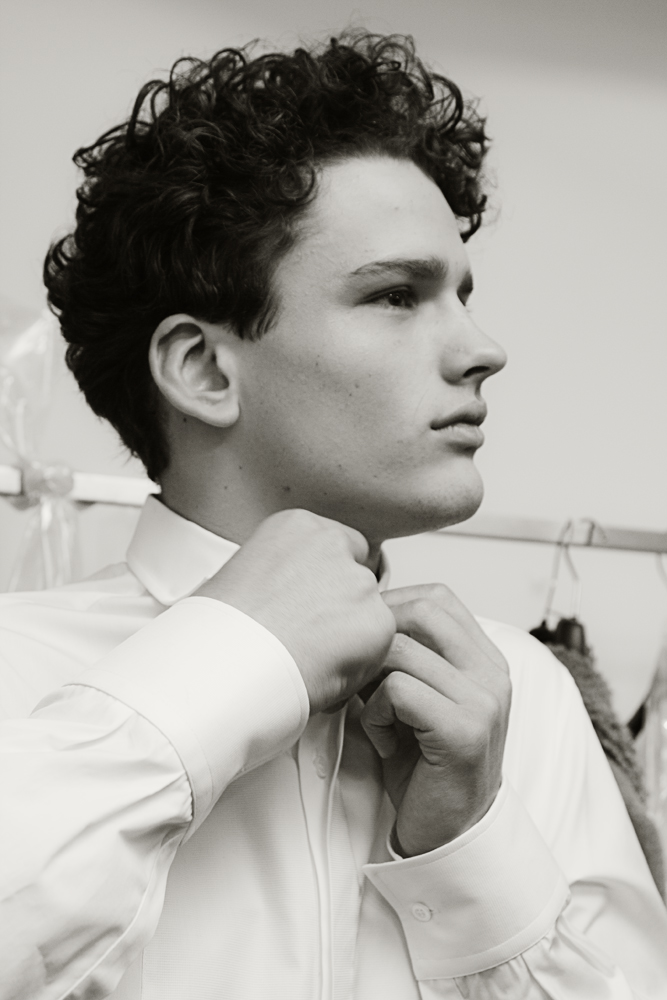
- Nessman in 2011
- Born: November 6, 1989 (age 36); Courtenay, British Columbia, Canada
- Spouse: Andreea Diaconu (m. 2020)
- Modeling information
- Height: 6 ft 2 in (188 cm)
- Hair color: Brown
- Eye color: Brown
- Waist: 31 (US)
- Inseam: 33 (US)
- Agency: Storm Model Management; Ford Europe; Soul Artist Management; Major Model Management; Ford Europe; Kult Agency; IMM Bruxelles; I LOVE; Sight; Mode Models

Simon Nessman (born November 6, 1989) is a Canadian model from Courtenay, British Columbia.

== Early life ==
Nessman was born in Courtenay, British Columbia, the son of Carolyn Ireland and Ron Nessman. The youngest of four children, he is of Austrian and Scottish descent. Nessman was discovered in late 2006 after a friend of his sister sent pictures of him to talent scout Kelly Streit of Mode Models of Canada. At the time 17-year-old Nessman was still attending high school at Georges P. Vanier Secondary and did not pursue his modelling career until graduating. Nessman moved to New York City to begin his modelling career, staying in the city for the next five years.

Nessman was an avid player in his school's basketball and rugby teams and received offers from both the University of the Fraser Valley and Quest University in British Columbia. In 2013, Nessman returned to Canada to complete his undergraduate degree in Squamish. He enrolled at Quest University, where he played basketball and earned a Bachelor of Arts and Science, graduating in May 2017.

== Career ==
Nessman is best known as the current face of Giorgio Armani. In addition, he has featured in ad campaigns for Versace, D&G, Givenchy, Calvin Klein, Ralph Lauren, Lanvin, Yves Saint Laurent, Barneys, Gap and John Galliano. He appeared in the 2012 music video of Madonna's new song, Girl Gone Wild, directed by fashion photographers Mert Alas and Marcus Piggott.

He has walked in shows for Salvatore Ferragamo, Roberto Cavalli, Tommy Hilfiger, Emporio Armani, Viktor & Rolf, Lacoste, DSquared², Narciso Rodriguez and Michael Kors and appeared in Vogue, Details, Numéro, V Man and L'Officiel Hommes.

He starred in the A/X Armani Exchange Spring 2011 advertising campaign with Clara Alonso, Alejandra Alonso, Marlon Teixeira, and Francisco Lachowski.

In 2012 Nessman became the face of the Giorgio Armani fragrance Acqua di Gio Essenza in an advertising campaign shot and directed by Bruce Weber. Nessman continued to feature in the 2014 print and video campaigns for the fragrance.

From late 2010 to 2014 Nessman starred in multiple print and film campaign advertisements for American fashion designer Michael Kors with Karmen Pedaru. He appeared alongside British supermodel and actress Cara Delevingne in the John Hardy Spring/Summer 2015 campaign, shot by Sebastian Faena in Bali.

== Achievements ==
In 2011, Nessman was ranked the second most successful male model in the world behind Sean O'Pry on the models.com list of the Top 50 international male models. In 2013, Forbes ranked Nessman third on their The World's Highest-Paid Male Models list behind David Gandy and Sean O'Pry, second and first respectively. In 2014, Nessman was nominated for a Model Of The Year award. As of 2015, Nessman was featured on Models.com's list of Sexiest Men, Top Icons Men, and The Money Guys. In 2019 Nessman is featured on Supers Men, the highest rank male model can attain on Models.com.

== Personal life ==
Nessman currently lives at Vargas Island near Tofino, British Columbia. In July 2020, he married Romanian supermodel Andreea Diaconu. Nessman has listed surfing as a passion.
