= Arthur Kulkov =

Russian male model (born 1983)

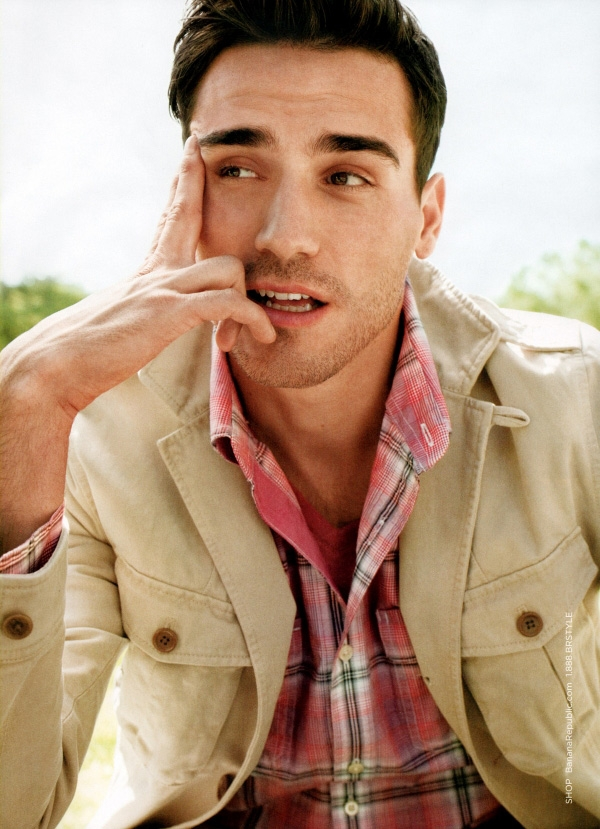
- Born: August 20, 1983 (age 42); Mezhdurechensk, Kemerovo Oblast, Russian SFSR, Soviet Union
- Occupations: Model, shoes designer
- Modeling information
- Height: 6 ft 1 in (1.85 m)
- Hair color: Brown
- Eye color: Brown
- Agency: Next (New York and London), Elite (Paris and Milan)

Arthur Kulkov (born August 20, 1983) is a Russian male model. His work has been prominently featured in American publications such as GQ and Details. He has been featured on covers for both publications, a rarity in the male model industry. He is recognized as one of the few successful Russian male models working internationally, consistently securing at least one fashion campaign each season he has been active.

== Early life ==
Arthur was born in Mezhdurechensk, Kemerovo Oblast. He immigrated from Russia arriving in New York City. He attended St. Francis College in Brooklyn, New York and graduated in 2005 with a bachelor's degree in Business Marketing. He was scouted by an industry individual while playing soccer, his favorite pastime during his college years. After several times saying he was not interested to the scout, he eventually went along to meet some people and started his modelling career.

== Career ==
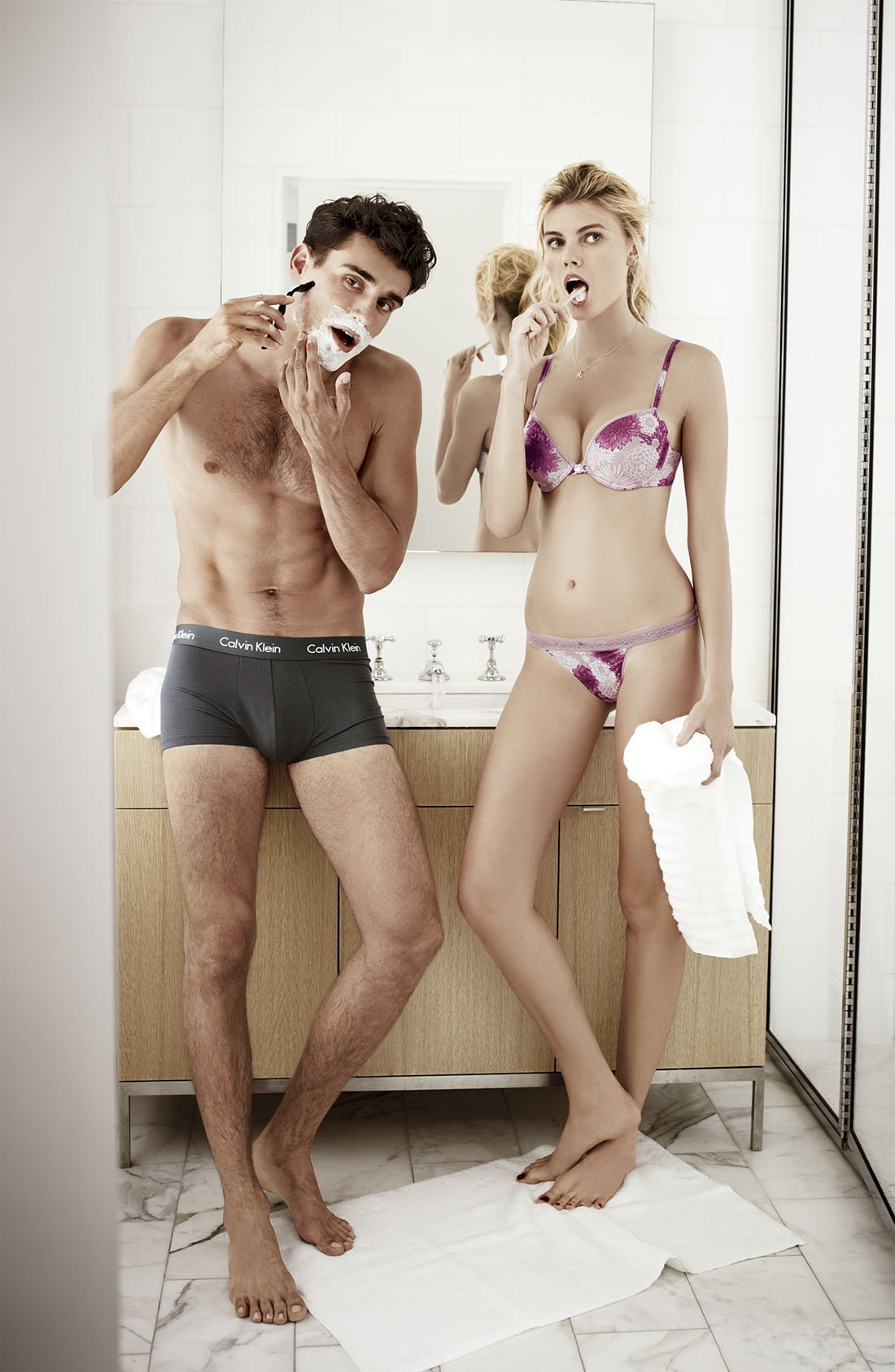
Kulkov with Maryna Linchuk (right) modelling for Nordstrom in 2011

While most models struggle getting exposure in print work at the beginning of their careers, Kulkov struck big success working for brands such as Barneys New York, Original Penguin, Sisley, and Russell & Bromley during the Fall 2008 season, his first ever and he has not even made his runway debut.

He has been prominently featured in international editions of GQ including American, French and Italian and Details since the beginning of his career due to his chameleon-like abilities, walk, professionalism and adapting to whatever the client or designer wants. These abilities have been praised by editors and stylists all over the industry.

In 2011, he set himself as a top model by becoming the face of Dolce & Gabbana for several seasons in a row, starting with the Fall 2010 campaign.

He became a permanent fixture for Tommy Hilfiger since 2011 being prominent featured in advertisements for "The Hilfigers" lifestyle campaign.

He participated in the "Rock the Sidewalk" event in Mexico City organized by Express to promote the brand. Only three international male models were chosen to be spokesperson and walk the runway at the historic Zócalo in downtown Mexico City.

He has drawn himself into acting, having appeared in the 2012 short film The Main Event in America, directed by AW McKnight, where he plays Phonix Mostlyn, a lightweight boxer who struggles with choosing between his dream of being a champion fighter or his love for a man. The film showed during the Honolulu Film Festival where he got positive reviews. This is his first feature film.

== Achievements ==
In 2009, a year after he started modelling, CRUSHfanzine (a magazine) dedicated its first issue to him with essays written by influential people in the industry and featured a journal with words and pictures by him. The magazine sold out its run.

In 2010, he was awarded the cover of GQ's special issue called "Style Manual". He was the only model to land such a cover.

Later, in 2011, he landed the March cover of Details, along with fellow model friends Sean O'Pry and Noah Mills. A rarity in the male model industry.

In 2012, he appeared on the cover of Chaos magazine where he was interviewed about his life, his career, what he thinks about the modelling industry, and what is coming next for him. The very first dedicated issue to a model.

During the spring 2013 season, he acquired a fragrance deal from Tommy Hilfiger called "Freedom by Tommy Hilfiger" which print and TV spot campaign show him along Victoria's Secret angel Lily Aldridge and he also landed the Banana Republic's Love campaign.

In 2013, Forbes named him the world's fourth best-paid male model.

In 2014, he appeared again on the cover of Details, along other fellow models like Noah Mills, Mathias Lauridsen, and Clement Chabernaud.

== Reception ==
He is signed with Re:Quest Model Management in New York, Bananas Models in Paris, and Why Not Model Management in Milan.

He is currently ranked #8 in The Money Guys List, which annually ranks the models who make more money inside the fashion industry.

He's also being featured in street style websites like Backyard Bill and The Sartorialist and magazines like GQ, which published an article about him, and T Magazine for his eye-catching personal style.

== Filmography ==
Year	Title	Role	Notes
2012	The Main Event In America	Phoenix "The Fury" Mostlyn	Short film
