= David Gandy =

British model (born 1980)

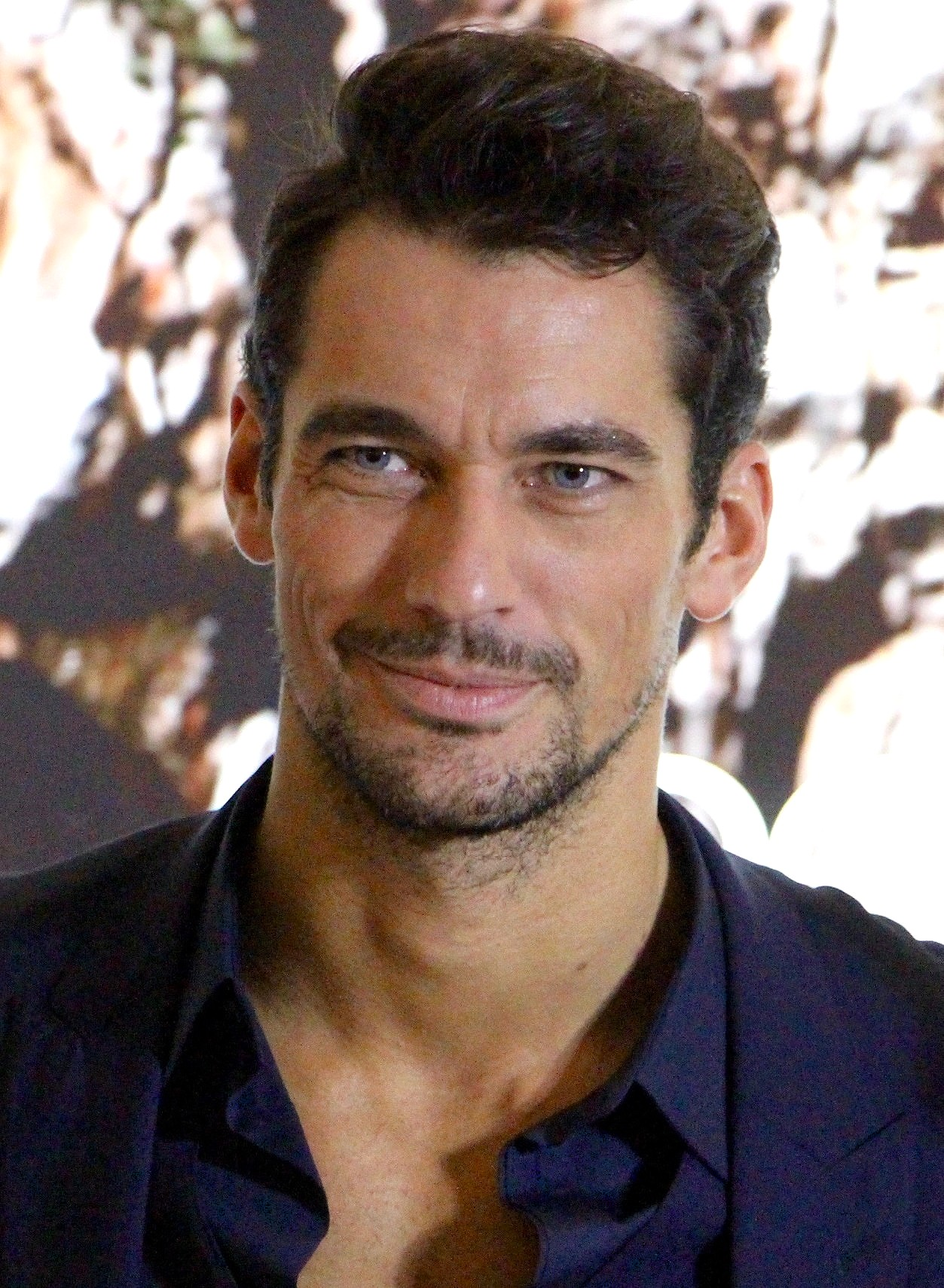
- Gandy in 2015
- Born: David James Gandy; 19 February 1980 (age 46); Billericay, Essex, England
- Partner: Stephanie Mendoros (2016–present)
- Children: 2
- Modelling information
- Height: 6 ft 3 in (191 cm)
- Hair colour: Dark brown
- Eye colour: Blue
- Agency: Select Model Management; Ford Models; New Madison Models

David James Gandy (born 19 February 1980) is an English model and creative director who began his career after winning a televised model-search competition. Widely regarded as the most successful male model of all time, Gandy is both the highest-grossing male model in history as well as the only male to feature on the Forbes list of the world's highest-paid models more than once. The lead male model for Dolce & Gabbana for over a decade, Gandy is now the creative director of his eponymous brand.

In an industry dominated by skinny models, Gandy's muscular build caused some menswear fashion designers to change standards. The increase in his popularity and name recognition resulted in a broad portfolio of magazine covers, editorial photo shoots, interviews and industry awards. He has gone on to participate in fashion-related and personal projects such as writing a blog for British Vogue, writing car reviews for British GQ, mobile app development and charity work.

== Modelling career ==
=== Background ===
Gandy was born in Billericay, Essex. In his youth, Gandy wanted to be a veterinary surgeon, but his grades were not high enough to meet the needed standards for that line of study. So, while studying multimedia computing, he went to work for Auto Express, delivering the latest Porsches and Jaguars to the track for testing. In 2001, while studying marketing at the University of Gloucestershire, Gandy's flatmate entered him (without his knowledge) into a modelling competition on ITV's This Morning hosted by Richard and Judy. The 21-year-old Gandy won the competition, and the prize included a contract with Select Model Management in London. The following year, he left university a few modules shy of receiving his honours degree in order to pursue modelling full time.

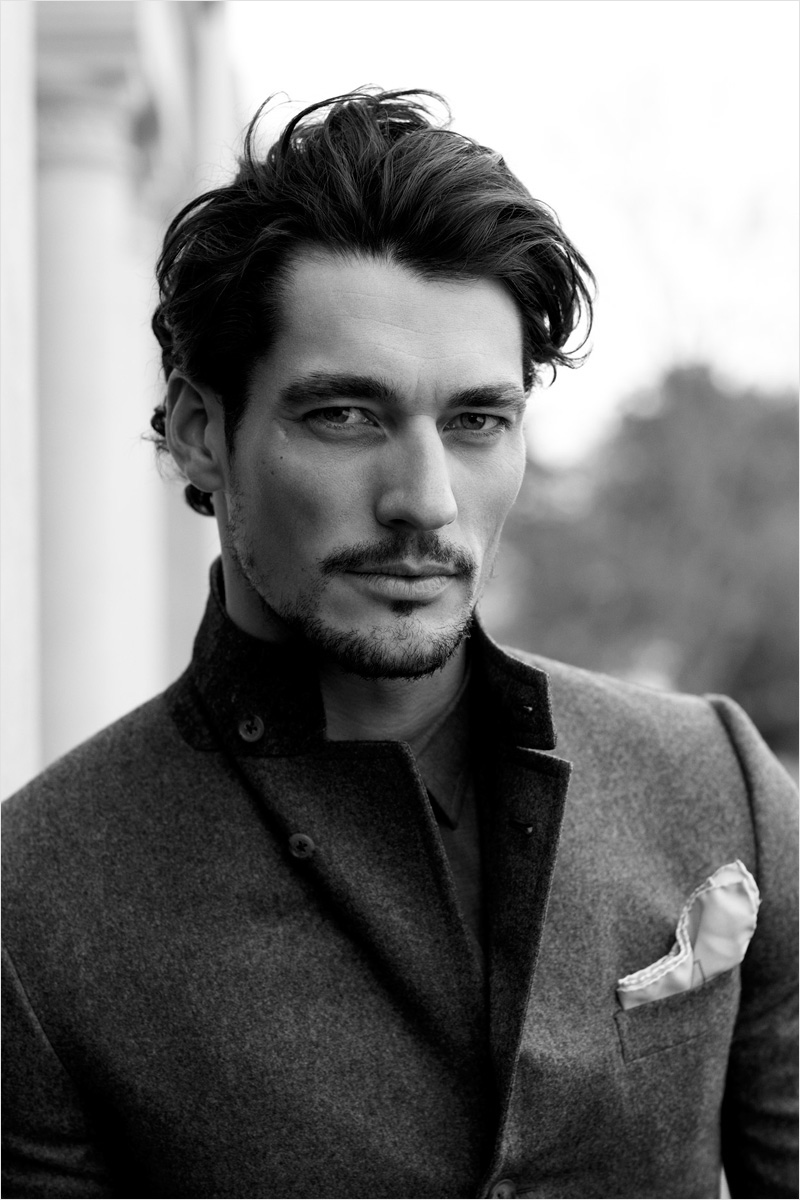
Gandy for GQ Japan by Arnaldo Anaya-Lucca (2009)

=== Work ===
During the early years of his career, Gandy modelled for a variety of companies, including Shiatzy Chen, 7 for all Mankind, Zara, Marks & Spencer, Gant U.S.A., Hugo Boss, Russell & Bromley, H&M, Carolina Herrera, Massimo Dutti and others. In 2006, he became the face of Dolce & Gabbana, annually starring in their apparel campaigns and fashion shows through 2011, working with female supermodels such as Gemma Ward, Scarlett Johansson, and Naomi Campbell as well as with male models including Noah Mills, Tony Ward, and Adam Senn.

Gandy is best known for the 2007 advertising campaign for Dolce & Gabbana's fragrance "Light Blue" with Marija Vujovic (shot by photographer Mario Testino), which had 11 million online hits and included a 50-foot billboard of Gandy displayed in Times Square. He modelled for Dolce & Gabbana's 2008 calendar, shot by photographer Mariano Vivanco. Gandy returned as the face of the second "Light Blue" fragrance campaign for 2010, but this time with Anna Jagodzinska. He also made a short promotional film for W Hotels with Helena Christensen called "Away We Stay".

In 2011, the fashion house published David Gandy by Dolce & Gabbana, a 280-page photographic coffee table book of images chronicling their years of collaboration. That same year, Gandy shot four magazine covers and five fashion editorial photoshoots. In 2012, he was featured on 16 magazine covers, appeared on 18 fashion editorials, and modelled for Banana Republic, Lucky Brand Jeans, El Palacio de Hierro, and Marks & Spencer. In addition, Gandy was named the brand ambassador for Johnnie Walker Blue Label.

In 2013, Dolce & Gabbana released the third version of the "Light Blue" fragrance campaign, also featuring Gandy. Once again, Mario Testino filmed the adverts and commercial on location in the island of Capri, southern Italy, but this time with the Italian model Bianca Balti in the female role. Bionda Castana, a British shoe label, released a fashion film featuring Gandy called "David Gandy's Goodnight." In it, he seduces several women who discover later that he has stolen their shoes. On 26 September, Gandy and Jaguar released a short film called "Escapism", which featured Gandy driving models such as the C-Type, the E-Type, the XKSS, and the new F-Type. In November, Marks & Spencer launched their 2013 Christmas advertising campaign, "Magic & Sparkle"; the fairy-tale-themed commercial featured Rosie Huntington-Whiteley with Helena Bonham Carter and Gandy.

== Other endeavours ==
=== Fashion projects ===
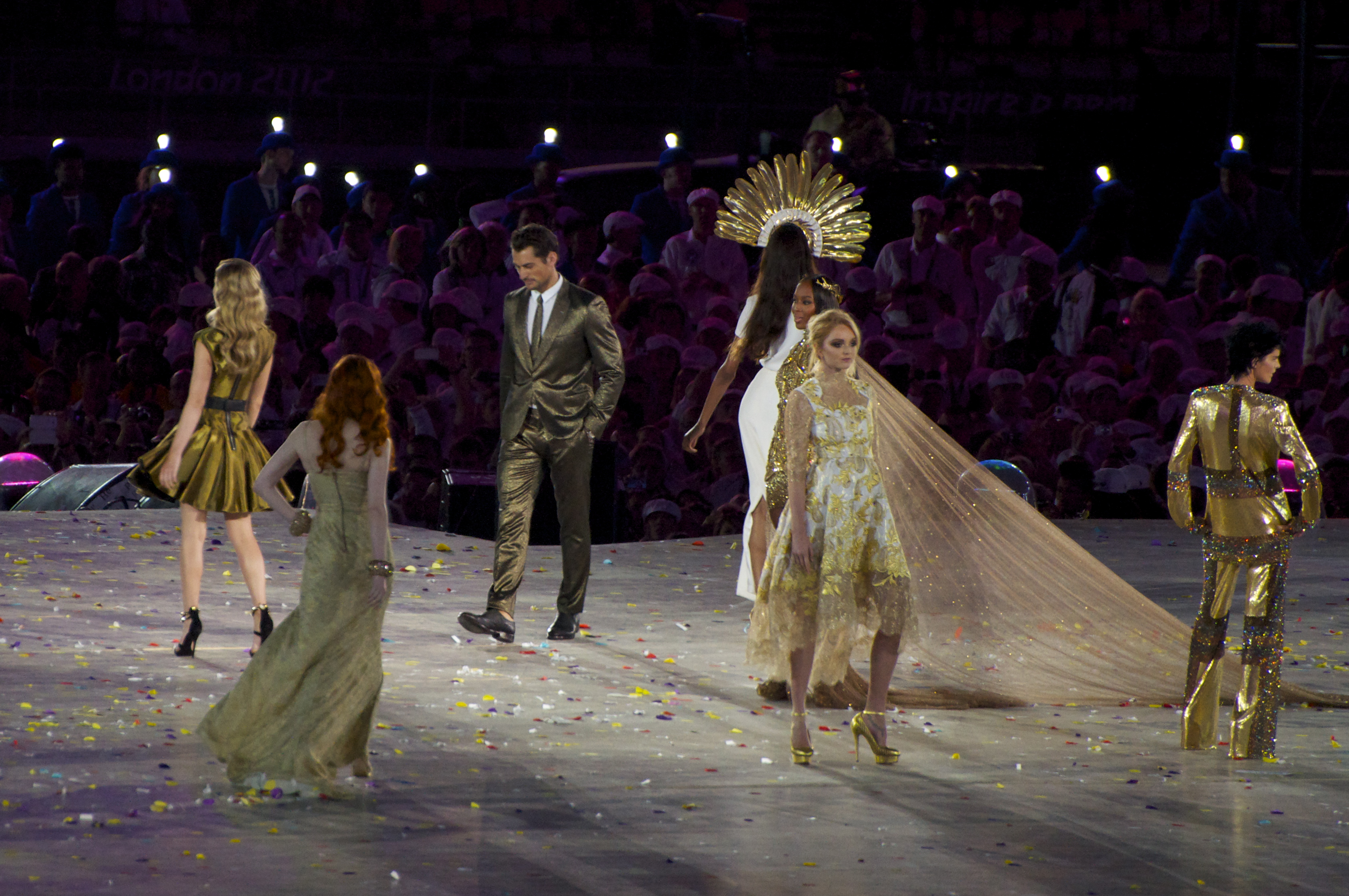
2012 Olympics—British Models

In May 2010, Gandy spoke at the University of Oxford Union as part of a panel that included photographer Tony McGee, Victoria & Albert Museum senior curator Claire Wilcox, fashion consultant Frances Card and Dolly Jones, the editor of British Vogue. He released the "David Gandy Men's Style Guide" mobile app in 2010 which offered style and clothing advice to men and which ultimately hit Top 3 in the Lifestyle market.

In September 2011, Gandy was named the spokesman for the Martini's "Luck Is An Attitude" campaign, launching their model-search competition on the Spanish Steps of Rome, which were opened specifically for the event. He was appointed to serve on the British Fashion Council's Committee to launch "London Collections: Men" as part of London Fashion Week 2012.

During the 2012 Summer Olympics closing ceremony, Gandy was the only male to walk the Union Jack-shaped catwalk featuring British fashions, alongside models Naomi Campbell, Kate Moss, Jourdan Dunn, Lily Donaldson, Georgia May Jagger, Karen Elson and Stella Tennant. For the occasion, he wore a gold bespoke suit by British designer Paul Smith. Gandy was invited to the Oxford Union once again on 19 November 2012 with Alex Bilmes, Editor of Esquire to discuss "The importance of men's fashion."

On 28 April 2013, Gandy participated in the 2013 Vogue Festival as part of a panel discussing, "Too Fat, Too Thin, Will We Ever Be Content?" The panel, chaired by Vogue's editor-in-chief, Fiona Golfar, also included model Daisy Lowe, child star Patsy Kensit and Vogue contributing editor Christa D'Souza.

=== Writing and other pursuits ===
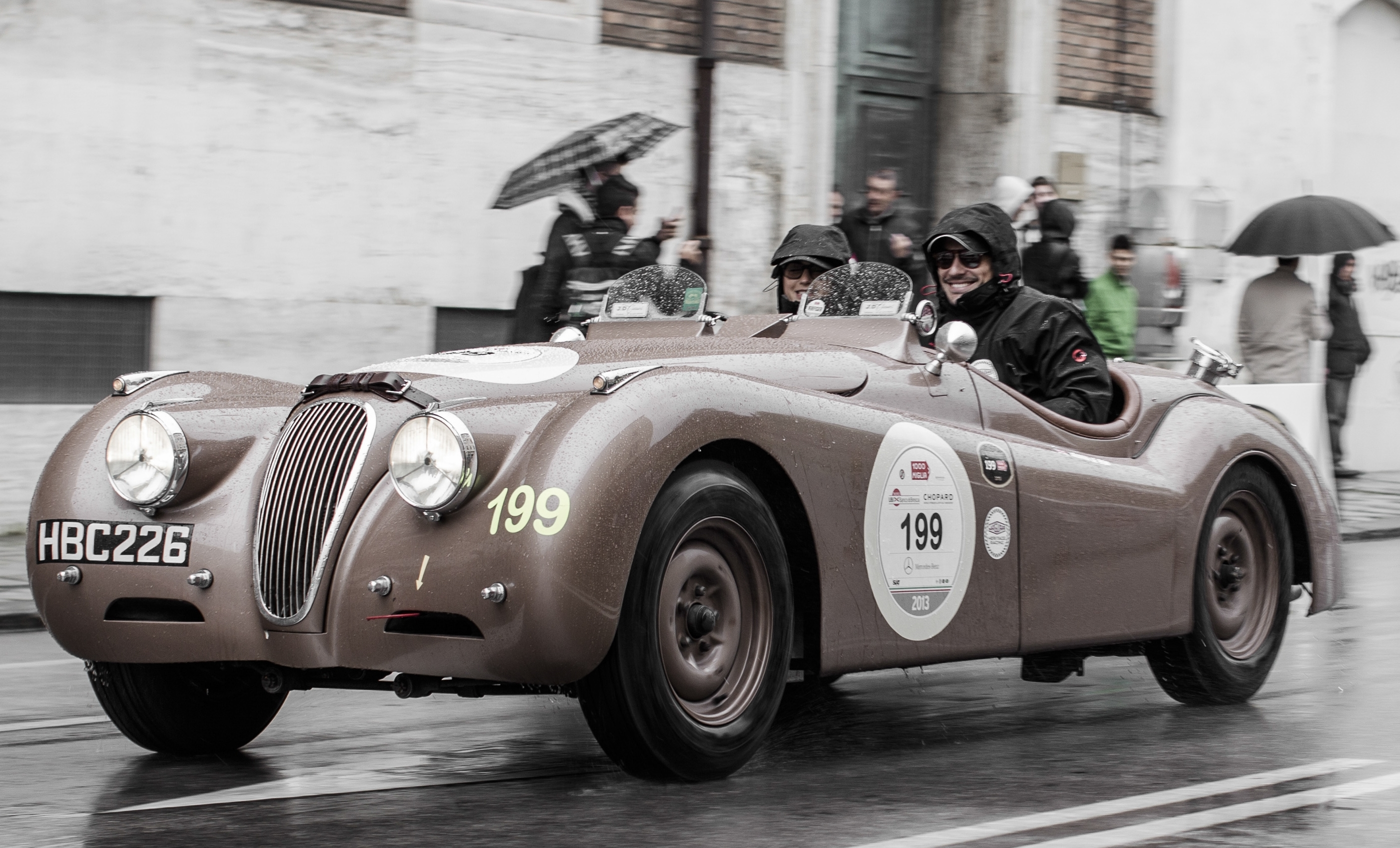
Gandy and Yasmin Le Bon - 2013 Mille Miglia

From February 2011, Gandy has regularly written a blog for British Vogue where he discusses his career, fashion/style, cars, antiques and life in London. He is also an official car reviewer for British GQ. In October 2011, London's Evening Standard invited Gandy to be guest writer/editor of their Men's Issue. His body has inspired fitness-industry interviews, exercise videos as well as his own fitness app which was released in December 2012.

After receiving his racing licence in 2012, Gandy was invited to be one of the drivers in the 2013 Mille Miglia ("1,000 Mile") race in Italy. Each year, the three-day event passes through nearly 200 Italian towns from Brescia to Rome and back, recreating the original races which took place between 1927 and 1957. He and his co-driver, Yasmin Le Bon, were part of "Team Jaguar", driving a 1950 XK120. Early in the race, Gandy and Le Bon were "pushed off the road by a competitor" which caused body damage to the bumper and side of the vintage car. They re-entered the race, ultimately finishing in 158th place out of 415 cars.

On 12 September 2013, The Daily Telegraph launched a new men's lifestyle section called "Telegraph Men". They announced that Gandy would be a contributing columnist.

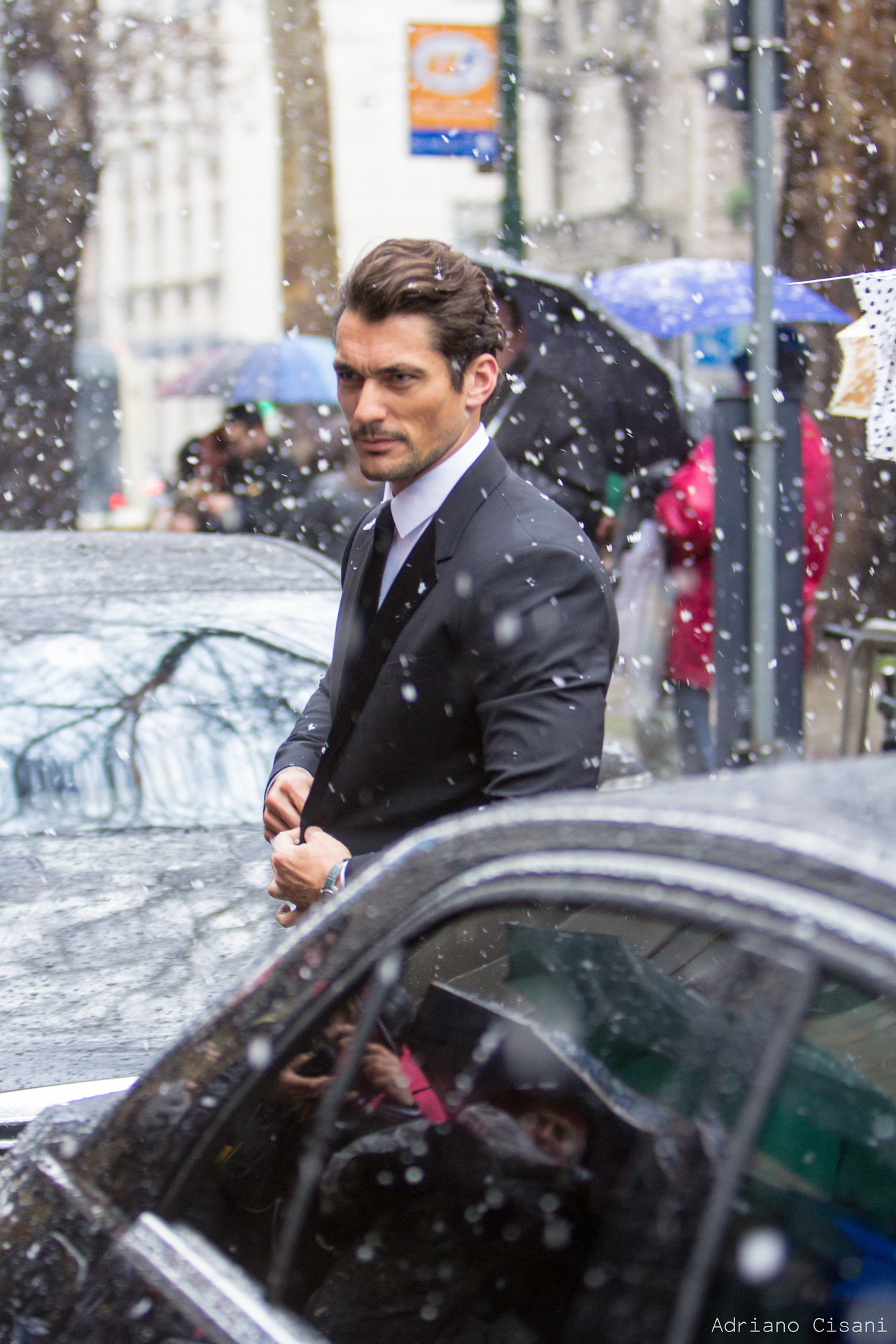
Gandy in Milan for a Dolce & Gabbana Fashion Show (2013)

=== Accolades ===
Gandy has been nominated for or received several awards in the modelling industry. In 2008, Spanish Glamour magazine named him "Most Beautiful International Male Face" at an event in Madrid, Spain. On 26 June 2009, Forbes magazine ranked him as the world's third most successful male model, behind Matt Gordon and Sean O'Pry. In 2010, Gandy was the first male ever nominated for "Model of the Year" by the British Fashion Council (BFC) and ShortList named him the "Face of Today" in 2011.

The Evening Standard included Gandy in their list of "London's 1,000 Most Influential People" for 2011 and again for 2012. For a second time, BFC nominated him for "Model of the Year" in 2012. Glamour readers voted him one of the "100 Sexiest Men of 2012" and he was ranked #17 of the "50 Best-Dressed in Britain" by GQ Magazine in 2012.

Cosmopolitan named Gandy one of "The Sexiest Men of 2013" and British GQ included him in their 2013 list of the "100 Most Influential Men in Britain". In October, Forbes updated their ranking of "The World's Top-Earning Male Models Of 2013". The list placed Gandy at #2 just behind Sean O'Pry. In December 2013, Glamour readers once again voted Gandy among the "Sexiest Men of 2013".

== Personal life ==
Gandy lives in Richmond Park with long term partner, family-law barrister Stephanie Mendoros, who is of Greek heritage. They holiday each year with their two daughters in Greece.

== Bibliography ==
- Howarth, Peter and Vivanco, Mariano: David Gandy by Dolce and Gabbana. New York City: Rizzoli, 2011. p. 6. ISBN 978-0-8478-3752-6.
