= Why Not Model Management =

Modeling agency

Why Not Model Management is a modeling agency based in Milan, Italy, and founded by Tiziana Casali and Vittorio Zeviani in 1976.

== Models ==
Models and talent currently and previously represented by the agency include:

- Aamito Lagum
- Adam Senn
- Agyness Deyn
- Alessia Locatelli
- Amy Wesson
- Bhavitha Mandava
- Bette Franke
- Bridget Hall
- Catherine McNeil
- Cintia Dicker
- Denisa Dvořáková
- Edita Vilkevičiūtė
- Élise Crombez
- Enikő Mihalik
- Evandro Soldati
- Francisco Lachowski
- Gracie Carvalho
- Hana Soukupová
- Imaan Hammam
- Irina Fedotova
- Jaime King
- Jessica Clarke
- Jodie Kidd
- Jon Kortajarena
- Julia Bergshoeff
- Karolína Kurková
- Kasia Smutniak
- Kate Bock
- Kati Nescher
- Kelly Gale
- Kim Noorda
- Lindsay Ellingson
- Margareth Madè
- Maryna Linchuk
- Mica Argañaraz
- Natalia Vodianova
- Natasha Poly
- Paolo Roldan
- Pietro Boselli
- Raica Oliveira
- Raquel Zimmermann
- Romina Lanaro
- Sam Webb
- Sanne Vloet
- Saskia de Brauw
- Sebastian Sauve
- Shannan Click
- Tao Okamoto
- Taylor Fuchs
- Thairine Garcia
- Vanessa Axente
- Zuri Tibby
- Magda Świder

== See also ==
- List of modeling agencies
