= Andreea Diaconu =

Romanian model (born 1991)

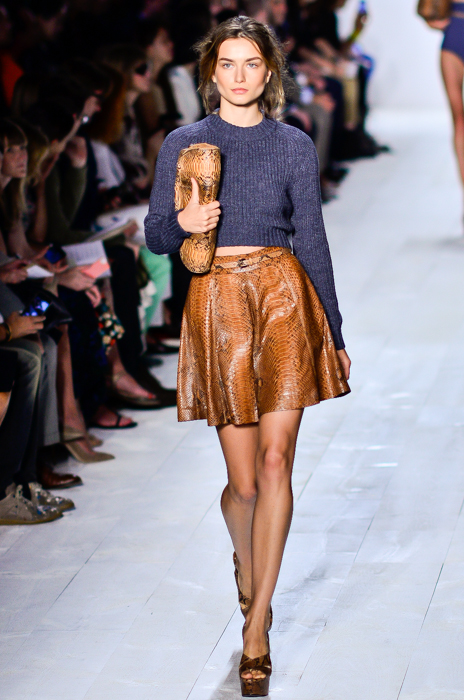
- Diaconu in 2014
- Born: 28 March 1991 (age 35); Bucharest, Romania
- Occupation: Model
- Spouse: Simon Nessman (m. 2020)
- Modeling information
- Height: 5 ft 10 1/2 in (1.79 m)
- Hair color: Brown
- Eye color: Blue
- Agency: DNA Models (New York); IMG Models (Milan); VIVA Model Management (Paris, London)

Andreea Diaconu (Romanian pronunciation: [anˈdree̯a diˈakonu]; born 28 March 1991) is a Romanian model, one of the most popular from her country. She has been featured on the covers of magazines from France, Romania, Russia, Spain, and Switzerland. Diaconu posed for Vogue magazine for the first time at age 21, for the February 2013 issue. She is the face of Gucci, Dolce & Gabbana, and Belstaff. In 2014, she was part of the spring campaign for Belstaff, featuring David Beckham.

Diaconu is notably the second Romanian, after Diana Moldovan, to pose for the Victoria's Secret catalog. Moldovan and Diaconu have also opened three health food restaurants called Moo Moo near Bucharest.

== Biography ==
Diaconu was 11 years old when a local scout first approached her to enter the field of modeling; however, she did not take them up on their offer until she was 13. She was discovered while swimming in a public pool. She explained her initial reluctance to become a model in an interview with the Daily Front Row, saying that the preconception of models is not great where she comes from, which is why she was not attracted to the idea. She added that encouragement from her friends and the money convinced her to pursue a career in modeling. Diaconu further elaborates on her first few years as a model in this excerpt from an interview with WSJ magazine:

My friend and I heard about a modeling school that had a contest where the winner got 500 euros. We thought that was a lot of money, so we went to the school, and I won.

Her next booking was headlining a Peter Pan–themed fashion show at the airport Radisson in her hometown of Bucharest. For 70 euros, she played Tinker Bell. Agents continued to approach her parents, but Diaconu didn't give modeling another go until a couple of years later. An agent booked her for a major show in New York, but the experience was a shock.

I remember crying and crying, and everything was too big on me. I was 13. I was a beanpole.

When a seamstress brought her to tears, she told her mother she wanted to go home.

Through high school, Diaconu modeled part time, but she was teased when she'd return from Paris or London with different colored hair. The international travel helped her learn five languages, though, and after graduation, she realized modeling could pay for higher education.

If she were not a model, she has described her dream job as either a karate instructor, translator, or surfer. Other than one show in London at age 13, Diaconu first showed on the runway during Milan Fashion Week Spring/Summer 2006 at age 14 for Dolce & Gabbana. She later moved to New York City when she was 20 years old to continue pursuing her career as a model.

Other than modeling, she has expressed interest in attending college and stated in an interview with Into the Gloss in September 2014 that she was studying social psychology at Western University of Health Sciences. Diaconu can speak five languages, including three fluently along with some French, Italian, and some basic Mandarin.

== Career ==
Diaconu has appeared on the covers of French, American, Spanish, Dutch, German, Brazilian, Korean, Mexican, and Turkish Vogue, French, Russian, and Romanian Elle, and W.

Diaconu has walked the runways for Roberto Cavalli, Prada, Tommy Hilfiger, Bottega Veneta, Gucci, Dolce & Gabbana, Michael Kors, Balmain, DKNY, John Galliano, Chanel, Blumarine, Versace, Oscar de la Renta, Emilio Pucci, Ralph Lauren, Salvatore Ferragamo, Marchesa, Giorgio Armani, Thierry Mugler, Moschino, Stella McCartney, DSquared2, Tom Ford, Vera Wang, Carolina Herrera, rag+bone, Chloé, Missoni, Gianfranco Ferré, Emporio Armani, Prabal Gurung, Céline, and Lanvin.

She has appeared in advertising campaigns for Viktor & Rolf, Gucci, Hugo Boss, Donna Karan, Céline, Tiffany & Co., De Beers, Chloé, Ralph Lauren, Dolce & Gabbana, Tod's, Salvatore Ferragamo, David Yurman, Giuseppe Zanotti, Trussardi, Isabel Marant, Balmain, Max Mara, Adolfo Dominguez, Custo Barcelona, J. Crew, H&M, Juicy Couture, and Gap.

She is currently the face of Donna Karan's Cashmere Mist fragrance campaign as well as Viktor & Rolf's Flowerbomb fragrance campaign.

== Philanthropy ==
Although she states that while she is not an activist, she believes in fighting against racism and homophobia in her own country as well as building "sustainable environment and economical growth in places such as Nairobi, where rape among 6-15 year olds is not uncommon". When asked what she would stand up for, she said:

Gender equality. Stop the poaching for ivory... can I stand up for that? It's somehow still happening. A lot. The situation in Syria is heart wrenching. Especially in the times we're living in. It's mind boggling. It would've been shorter to ask what I wouldn't stand up for. How could we all make the world a better place? Everyone can do little things like recycling, taking shorter showers and making kids giggle."

She is involved with the St. Jude Children's Research Hospital, and Art and Abolition, an organization dedicated to ending child sex slavery in East Africa.
