= Francesco Borgato =

Italian dancer and singer

Francesco Borgato (born September 5, 1990, in Venice) is an Italian recording artist, dancer, choreographer, ex-member of Ukrainian pop group Kazaky.

== Biography ==
=== Early dancing career ===
Born in Venice, Veneto, Italy, Francesco began his dancing career at the age of 6 in a local dance studio where he got close to hip-hop, contemporary dance and ballet.

Throughout the years, his talent has been nationally recognized, winning awards in many competitions and working as a choreographer all over the country.

In 2006, after appearing as a dancer in Turkish singer Gülşen Bayraktar music video for the song Ya Tutarsa, he became a part of "Mighty Power" dance group, created by international choreographer and dancer Etienne Jean Marie. Once in the group, Francesco performed and danced for MTV TRL Italy (2007), Italian movie "Iago" (2008), Italian singer Elisa's Mechanical Dream Tour (2009) and Italian music festival by Radio Birikina called Festival Show (2009).

=== Professional growth and Kazaky proposal ===
In 2010, he spent the summer between Los Angeles and New York training and perfecting his skills as a dancer and as a singer.

At the beginning of 2011 he posted a video on his YouTube channel FrancescoBorgato for his class choreography to a popular song which quickly became popular. Among the rest, the video caught the attention of Ukrainian group Kazaky who were in need of a new member and consequentially contacted Francesco to join them.

=== Kazaky project ===
In August 2011, Stas Pavlov left the group Kazaky and was replaced by Francesco Borgato. On August 6, 2011, Francesco performed for the first time with Kazaky in Stockholm, Sweden and lately embarked on a world tour with the group.

His first video with the group was released in January 2012 for the song "Dance and Change". A couple of months later, in March 2012, he then appeared, alongside the group, in Madonna's video for the single "Girl Gone Wild".

In July 2012, still a member of the group, he appeared in fashion review V Magazine, which dedicated an article to them with an iconic photo shoot by Inez & Vinoodh styled by Nicola Formichetti. A video with some footage from the shoot has been released with the title Kazaky Horror Picture Show.

In October 2012 the video for Kazaky's single Last Night was released and premiered both on MTV Russia and on V Magazine site. The clip features two interludes in which Francesco narrates in his mother tongue.

In January 2013 the group performed in Turkey at the Dosso Dossi fashion show, with top model Adriana Lima doing the runway during their number.

On February 25, 2013, Francesco Borgato wrote on both his Facebook and Twitter profiles that he was leaving the group to pursue a solo career. The rest of the group has not spoken about the fact ever since.

=== Solo career ===
According to an interview Francesco gave to his Facebook fanclub, new music was supposed to be released starting from March 2013. Instead, no material has been released except for photo shoots. The artist is currently in the studio working on his solo comeback.
