= Kazaky =

Ukrainian synthpop dance boyband

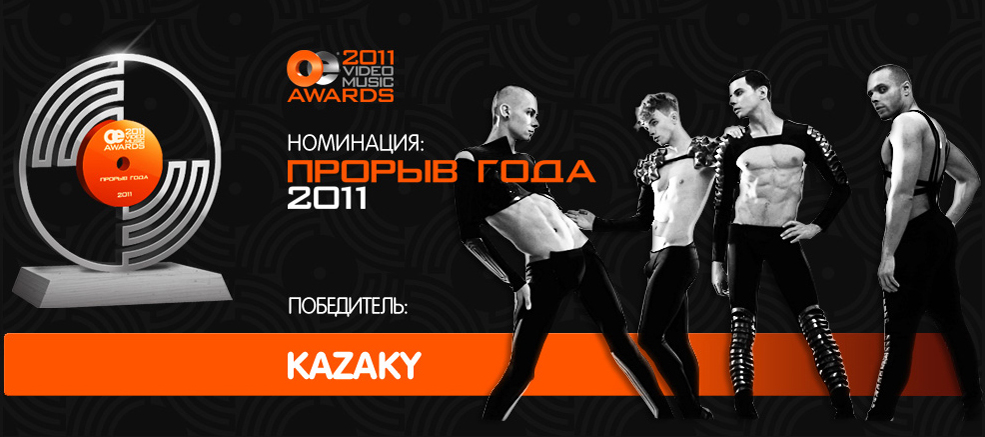

Background information
- Origin: Kyiv, Ukraine
- Genres: Synthpop; EDM
- Years active: 2010–2016; 2019–present
- Label: Kazaky
- Members: Kyryll Fedorenko; Artur Gaspar; Artemiy Lazarev; Vlad Koval; Evgeny Goncharenko
- Past members: Stas Pavlov; Francesco Borgato; Oleg Zhezhel
- Website: kazaky.com

Kazaky is a Ukrainian synthpop dance boyband, made up of Kyryll Fedorenko, Artur Gaspar and Artemiy Lazarev. Assembled in Kyiv in 2010 by former original member Zhezhel, a choreographer, the group has released two albums and several singles so far. In 2016 the group announced they were disbanding saying "It's time to create new interesting things" with the group members pursuing solo careers. In 2019, the group reformed with two new members Vlad Koval and Evgeny Goncharenko.

== History ==
=== 2010–11: Formation and Single releases ===
The band is originally made up of Kyryll Fedorenko, Artur Gaspar, Stas Pavlov and Oleg Zhezhel. The group's first single, "In the Middle", was released at the end of 2010, earning them the "Breakthrough of the Year" award at the 2010 Myway Dance Awards. The video features the four group members dancing in boy clothes at first, and then transitioning into a more androgynous look with their signature stiletto heels. It was then followed by the video for their second single, "Love," shot in black & white. In June 2011, the group performed at the DSquared² Men Spring/Summer 2012 runway show. On 16 July 2011, they made their American debut at Club 57 in New York City, and performed their third single "I'm Just a Dancer" for the first time. In August 2011, original member Pavlov left the group and was replaced by Italian singer Francesco Borgato.

=== 2012–13: Departure of Zhezhel, The Hills Chronicles and I Like It ===
With this new line-up, they released two more singles, called "Dance and Change" and "Last night" until they released the group's debut album The Hills Chronicles on October 22, 2012. In 2012, Kazaky are featured as cameo as background dancers in the Madonna music video "Girl Gone Wild". On February 26, 2013, Borgato announced his departure from the group to pursue a solo career. Former original member Stas Pavlov rejoined the group immediately after Borgato's departure, and he is featured in the group's new track and video, "Crazy Law", released on March 4, 2013. It will serve as the group's first single of their second studio album, titled I Like It, which is set to be released in two parts. The first part has been released on June 9, 2013, while the second part has been released on December 12, 2013. The follow-up singles were "Touch Me" and the promotional single "Doesn't Matter", both released in 2013. On December 12, 2013, founder Zhezhel announced on their official Facebook page that he won't perform with Kazaky anymore, leaving them as a trio, thus he added that he will continue to produce the group's music and choreographies. He stated he won't leave Kazaky.

=== 2014–15: Second departure of Pavlov and Singles ===
In 2014, original member Pavlov left the band for a second time and was soon to be replaced by new member Artemiy Lazarev. In 2014, the follow-up singles "The Sun", "Magic Pie" and "Pulse", which music video has been shot by director Radislav Lukin, and the promotional single "Horizon" have been released. On September 29, 2014, Kazaky were featured in the song "Strange Moves" by The Hardkiss, to be released as a single with a music video. Zhezhel makes a special cameo appearance in "Strange Moves" alongside his former bandmates. In 2015, the final single from I Like It, titled "What You Gonna Do", has been released. In the same year, the group makes a dance sequence cameo in the video for Loreen's music video "Paper Light (Higher)". Their single "Milk-Choc" has been released in 2015 as the lead single from their upcoming third studio album.

=== 2016: Disbanding and 2019: Return ===
In June 2016 the band announced they would be disbanding due to each member wanting to take different creative paths individually. Kazaky has stated that the band cannot exclude the idea of them not coming back together again to create something for the fans. The group has since been posting updates on their "Kazaky Official" Facebook page about their individual activities such as solo concerts and collaborations with other artists. But on June 24, 2019, finally after more than three years, Kazaky come back together posting a new video on YouTube of the song "Push" where appear two new member Vlad Koval and Evgeny Goncharenko. The band dedicated "Push" to the "entire LGBTQ community" that had supported them over the past nine years. The song was released to mark the 2019 Kyiv Pride parade. Other singles were published in the same year like "Inside My Body", "Hands up" and "We Should Be Like No One Else".

== Other endeavours ==
=== Fashion ===
Because of their daring and unusual fashion sense, the band has been featured on a number of high-profile publications, such as Attitude, Billboard, GQ, The Los Angeles Times, New York Post and The New York Times. After Anna Osmekhina created their fashion for the "Love" music video, Kazaky hired her to design their outfits and style their videos. However, the group has also received and worn fashion from DSquared² and Thierry Mugler. Their high-heeled shoes are all 5.5 inches (14 centimetres), and they are designed to allow them to dance comfortably for their stage performances. The group has a penchant for elaborate, decadent and very structural costumes, or alternatively very skimpy outfits meant to enhance the physicality of their performances.

== Artistry ==
=== Music ===
Kazaky's sound draws on house, synthpop, electronica and dance. Their tracks feature monotone, loopy, manipulated vocals and dance-driven, layered beats with electronic bleeps and prominent bass lines.

=== Style ===
"Kazaky" is Ukrainian for "Cossacks". The Cossacks had a very prominent role in the shaping of Ukraine's national history and culture. However, the band claims that their name has nothing to do with the Cossacks, but that it is a derivative form of the Japanese word Kazaki, which they claim is a popular word in Japan.

== Members ==
Member	2010	2011	2012	2013	2014	2015	2016	2019
Kyryll Fedorenko (2010-2016; 2019–present)								
Artur Gaspar (2010–2016; 2019–present)								
Artemiy Lazarev (2014–2016; 2019–present)								
Oleg Zhezhel (2010–2013)								
Stas Pavlov (2010–2011; 2013–2014)								
Francesco Borgato (2011–2013)								
Vlad Koval (2019–present)								
Evgeny Goncharenko (2019–present)								

Oleg won't perform with Kazaky anymore, but he will continue to produce the group's music and choreographies.

== Discography ==
=== Studio albums ===
List of studio albums with selected chart positions
Title	Album details	Chart positions	
Title	Album details	RUS	UKR
The Hills Chronicles	Released: October 22, 2012; Label: Kazaky; Formats: CD, digital download	—	—
I Like It (Part 1 + 2)	Released: Jul 9 and Dec 12, 2013; Label: Kazaky; Formats: digital download	—	—
Greatest Songs	Released: July 25, 2017; Label: Kazaky	—	—
Music from Live Shows	Released: September 8, 2017; Label: Kazaky; Formats: digital download	—	—
"—" denotes a studio album that did not chart.

=== Singles ===
List of singles with selected chart positions
Title	Year	Chart positions		Info	Album
Title	Year	RUS	UKR	Info	Album
"Love"	2011	—	—	Released on February 14, 2011, in EP format	The Hills Chronicles
"In the Middle"	2011	—	—	Released on July 1, 2011, as a single EP with remixes. Re-released on August 20, 2013	The Hills Chronicles
"I'm Just a Dancer"	2011	—	—		The Hills Chronicles
"Dance and Change"	2011	—	—	Released on November 24, 2011, in EP format	The Hills Chronicles
"Crazy Law"	2013	—	—		I Like It (Part 1)
"Touch Me"	2013	—	—	Released on July 11, 2013, in EP format	I Like It (Part 1)
"Magic Pie"	2014	—	—		I Like It (Part 1)
"The Sun"	2014	—	—		I Like It (Part 2)
"Pulse"	2014	—	—		I Like It (Part 2)
"What You Gonna Do"	2015	—	—		I Like It (Part 2)
"Milk-Choc"	2015	—	—		Greatest Songs
"Your Style"	2015	—	—		Greatest Songs
"Push"	2019				TBA
"—" denotes single that did not chart or was not released.

=== Singles (As featured artist) ===
List of singles with selected chart positions
Title	Year	Chart positions		Info	Album
Title	Year	RUS	UKR	Info	Album
"Strange Moves" (The Hardkiss feat. Kazaky)	2014	—	—	Released on September 29, 2014	Stones and Honey
"—" denotes single that did not chart or was not released.

=== Promotional Singles ===
List of promotional singles with selected chart positions
Title	Year	Chart positions		Album
Title	Year	RUS	UKR	Album
"Last Night"	2012	—	—	The Hills Chronicles
"I Can't Stop"	2012	—	—	The Hills Chronicles
"Doesn't Matter"	2013	—	—	I Like It (Part 1)
"Horizon"	2014	—	—	I Like It (Part 2)
"—" denotes promotional single that did not chart or was not released.

== Filmography ==
=== Music videos ===
As Main Artist
Title	Year	Director(s)
"Love"	2010	Yevgeniy Timokhin
"In the Middle"	2011	Yevgeniy Timokhin
"I'm Just a Dancer"	2011	Andrey Sarymsakov
"Dance and Change"	2011	Alan Badoev
"Last Night"	2012	Yevgeniy Timokhin
"Crazy Law"	2013	Hindrek Maasik
"Touch Me"	2013	Hindrek Maasik
"Doesn't Matter"	2013	Various (Footage)
"Magic Pie"	2014	Ivan Kvasha
"The Sun"	2014	Roy Raz
"Pulse"	2014	Radislav Lukin
"What You Gonna Do"	2015	Radislav Lukin
"Milk-Choc"	2015	Hindrek Maasik
"Your Style"	2015	Hindrek Maasik
"Push"	2019	Alan Badoev

As Featured Artist
Title	Artist	Year	Director(s)	Note(s)
"Girl Gone Wild"	Madonna	2012	Mert Alas & Marcus Piggott	Dance sequence cameo appearance
"Strange Moves"	The Hardkiss feat. Kazaky	2014	Valeriy Bebko	Released on September 29, 2014. Oleg Zhezhel makes a special cameo appearance
"Paper Light (Higher)"	Loreen	2015	Charli Ljung	Dance sequence cameo appearance

Other Videos
Title	Year	Director(s)	Note(s)
"Pohvir (Change, You Can, I Know)"	2011	Andrey Sarymsakov	Footage from the music video "I'm Just a Dancer"
"Love (Horror Picture Show Version)"	2012	Yevgeniy Timokhin	Promo video by V Magazine with the song "Love"
"Stadium"	2012	Yevgeniy Timokhin	Promo video for the debut albums intro "Symphony No. 404"

== Tours ==
- The Pulse Tour (2014–2015)

== See also ==
- List of synthpop artists
- Ukrainian culture
