= Danny Schwarz (model) =

British model (born 1986)

- Born: 17 April 1986 (age 40); Croydon, London, England
- Modeling information
- Height: 1.86 m (6 ft 1 in)
- Hair color: Brown
- Eye color: Green
- Agency: VNY Model Management

Danny Schwarz (born 17 April 1986 in Croydon, London) is an English male model.

== Career ==
Schwarz signed with Premier Model Management in 2008. He has appeared in numerous campaigns and catwalk shows for brands such as D&G, Pepe Jeans, Missoni, Armani jeans and Colcci. He also shot a campaign with Brazilian model Gisele Bündchen and has worked with photographers such as Mario Testino . He also starred in a Calvin Klein ad campaign that was controversially banned for depicting a threesome shot by Steven Meisel.

In 2009, he was named the 4th most successful male model in the world by Forbes magazine. In addition, he has also appeared in publications such as 10, Vogue, GQ and OUT. He is good friends with Sean O'Pry.

== Agencies ==
Schwarz is signed to VNY Model Management.
