= Bionda Castana =

British footwear company

- Industry: Footwear
- Founded: 2007; 19 years ago
- Founders: Natalia Barbieri; Jennifer Portman
- Headquarters: London, England
- Products: High-heels
- Website: biondacastana.com

Bionda Castana is a luxury women’s footwear brand founded in 2007 by London-based entrepreneurs Natalia Barbieri and Jennifer Portman. The brand closed in late 2016 and relaunched in November 2018 with a sustainable, direct-to-consumer business strategy.

== History ==
Bionda Castana was founded by Natalia Barbieri and Jennifer Portman. The friends met in London while studying economics at the University of Westminster. In 2007 they quit their corporate jobs and launched their company, naming it Bionda Castana, ‘blonde brunette’ in Italian.

Their first stockist was London boutique Browns who began carrying the collection in 2009. The duo’s designs also caught the eye of Vogue Italia Editor-in-Chief Franca Sozzani, and in 2010 the company was honored with the publication’s ‘Who Is On Next?’ award. Dubai’s Level Shoes became a stockist in 2012, and luxury British department store Harvey Nichols followed in 2013.

In 2015, Bionda Castana was named among Walpole’s Brands of Tomorrow, and secured London department stores Selfridges and Harrods as wholesale stockists. In June of that year, the brand opened a boutique on London’s Elizabeth Street, offering a made-to-order service in addition to the main collection. In January 2016, the brand launched a collaboration with high street brand LK Bennett, and by May 2016, the brand had already met its financial targets for the year and moved into a larger boutique on Elizabeth Street.

Bionda Castana’s Spring/Summer 2016 collection launched with a campaign shot by photographer Dima Hohlev, featuring a ballet dancer as the model. The images saw Hohlov named Best Fashion Photographer in the LeBook Connections Awards 2016. The brand shuttered in late 2016 to allow the founders to separate from their investors. Barbieri later explained: "We weren’t aligned with our external investment team".

== Relaunch ==
In November 2018, Bionda Castana relaunched after a two-year hiatus with a direct-to-consumer, sustainable business model. The zero-waste strategy sees just four archive styles available to buy for a limited period at the beginning of each month. The shoes are then made-to-order using surplus fabric from the brand’s old stock, and shipped direct from the factory to the buyer. On the decision to relaunch, Barbieri said: "There was a process where you have to break up and then start back up again… Taking the break gave us the foresight to think about how would we be able to approach it in a smarter way and still be able to be creative and meet our customers’ demands." When the surplus archive fabrics run out, the company plans to use surplus fabrics from other fashion houses in order to maintain its zero-waste policy.

== Collaborations ==
Bionda Castana has been collaborating with designer fashion brands on their London Fashion Week catwalk shows since 2012, including Osman, Matthew Williamson and Tala and Lina Samman.

The Fall/Winter 2013 collection was launched with a short film directed by actor David Schwimmer and starring model David Gandy.

In November 2015 the brand created a capsule collection to raise funds for HIV prevention and support charity Mothers2Mothers
