= Bhavitha Mandava =

Indian model (born 2000)

- Mandava in 2026
- Born: Bhavitha Mandava; February 3, 2000 (age 26); Vijayawada, Andhra Pradesh, India
- Education: Jawaharlal Nehru Technological University; New York University
- Occupation: Model
- Years active: 2024–present
- Modeling information
- Height: 1.75 m (5 ft 9 in)
- Hair color: Black
- Eye color: Dark brown
- Agency: 28Models; Women Management Paris; Why Not Model Management; Premier Model Management

Bhavitha Mandava (born February 3, 2000) is an Indian fashion model. At the 2025 Métiers d'Art show in New York, she became the first Indian model to open a Chanel runway. Her parents viral reaction video turned Mandava into a symbol of Indian representation in fashion overnight.

== Early life ==
Mandava was born into a middle class Telugu family in Vijayawada, Andhra Pradesh and was raised in Hyderabad, India. Her mother is a housewife, her fathers profession remains undisclosed and her grandparents own mango farms in India.

She studied architecture at Jawaharlal Nehru Technological University in Hyderabad. After earning her bachelor's degree, she secured loans in India and moved to New York City to pursue a Master of Science in Integrated Design & Media/Human Computer Interaction from the New York University Tandon School of Engineering. Mandava has a brother, like her, he moved from India to study in the United States, completing a Masters of Business Analytics at the University of Cincinnati, Carl H. Lindner College of Business.

Mandava identifies as Hindu and details going to pray at Hindu temples with her mother in India, and at Ganesh temples in New York.

== Career ==
Mandava had been scouted by many model agents in India and the US but declined their offers saying, "you hear really terrible things about being a model". However, in 2024 whilst on her way to eat biryani, she was scouted and signed by model agent Showin Bishop at Atlantic Avenue station in Brooklyn, New York City, starting her career. In September 2024, she walked as a exclusive model in designer Matthieu Blazy's Milan Bottega Veneta Spring/Summer 2025 show and featured in the campaign. The same month she walked for Dior's Spring/Summer 2025 show in Paris. She walked fashion weeks, while completing her studies.

In October 2025, Mandava walked the Chanel Spring/Summer 2026 show as an exclusive. In December 2025, she opened the Chanel Métiers d'Art 2026 collection show at Manhattan's Bowery subway station and became the first Indian model to do so. Bhavitha's live reaction video of her supportive mother and father crying with pride whilst watching her walk the show went viral.

In January 2026, Mandava closed the Chanel Haute Couture Spring 2026 show as the Chanel Bride the first Indian to do so. In February 2026, Mandava covered the March 2026 issue of British Vogue wearing Chanel, which was followed by covers for Perfect Magazine, Numero France and I-D, all three wearing Chanel. In March, she became the first Indian model to become a House ambassador for Chanel, joining Ananya Panday who a year prior became the first Indian brand ambassador for Chanel.

In July 2026, Mandava was announced as cast in the all Indian 2027 Pirelli calendar; she was shot alongside Padma Lakshmi, Anoushka Shankar, Freida Pinto, Rupi Kaur, Aditi Rao Hydari, Avantika Vandanapu, Avani Rai and Lakshmi Menon, along with 200 people from the streets of India. Mandava said of the experience "I wasn't very enthusiastic about the past eroticism of the Pirelli calender" and "I like to think my race isn't the most interesting thing about me".

In 2026, she was recognised as Forbes 30 under 30 Asia global rising stars, and was ranked on Models.com top 50 models.

== Public image ==
Bhavitha made her debut for the Met Gala in May 2026, wearing Chanel "Haute Couture reinterpretation" of the look she wore to open Chanel’s Métiers d’Art show, the look going viral for dividing the internet, some felt it was understated, others felt it was underwhelming. In September, she made her red carpet debut at the 83rd Venice International Film Festival where she attended the premiere of Mr. Nelson, Did You Kill People?. She wore a "turquoise Chanel mermaid gown" that took 1,250 hours to embroider by hand and British Vogue named her one of the standout best–dressed moments of the festival.

Mandava attended the BoF 500 gala with her parents, her mother's silver Kanjeevaram silk sari attracted public attention from the Indian community.
