= Girl Gone Wild =

2012 single by Madonna

Single by Madonna

from the album MDNA
- Released: March 2, 2012
- Recorded: 2011
- Studio: Sarm West (London); MSR (New York City)
- Genre: Electropop; dance-pop; Euro disco; electro; Euro house; techno
- Length: 3:43
- Label: Interscope
- Songwriters: Madonna; Jenson Vaughan; Benny Benassi; Alle Benassi
- Producers: Madonna; Benny Benassi; Alle Benassi

Madonna singles chronology
"Give Me All Your Luvin'" (2012)	"Girl Gone Wild" (2012)	"Turn Up the Radio" (2012)

Music video
- "Girl Gone Wild" on YouTube

"Girl Gone Wild" is a song by American singer Madonna from her twelfth studio album, MDNA (2012). She co-wrote the song with Benny Benassi, his cousin Alle Benassi (known together as the Benassi Bros.), and songwriter Jenson Vaughan, while the Benassi Bros. co-produced the track with Madonna. Vaughan had worked on the lyrics before sending them to Madonna, who developed the demo into the final version of "Girl Gone Wild". The song was confirmed by Madonna as the second single from the album and was released on March 2, 2012, by Interscope Records.

Musically, "Girl Gone Wild" is a mid-tempo electropop, dance, Euro disco, electro, Euro house and techno party track with a four-on-the-floor influence. The song opens with the Act of Contrition prayer and "confession" by Madonna, and features EDM-heavy elements. After the song was released, Joe Francis, creator of the Girls Gone Wild adult entertainment franchise, threatened to sue Madonna for copyright infringement if she sang the song during her performance at the Super Bowl XLVI halftime show. And the song was one of the official theme songs of WrestleMania XXVIII. Madonna's representatives stated that she was not aware of either Francis or the lawsuit, and cited the fact that several songs with the same name had already been recorded or released by other artists.

The song received mixed reviews from critics, who praised its composition and return to dance music for Madonna, but criticized its lyrics and believed it failed as the album-opener of MDNA. "Girl Gone Wild" reached the top-ten of many global charts, including Hungary, Israel, Italy, Russia, South Africa, South Korea and Spain, along with the Billboard digital charts in Greece. It debuted and peaked at number 38 on US Pop Songs due to lack of radio airplay. It also became Madonna's 42nd number-one hit on the Hot Dance Club Songs chart.

A black-and-white music video for the song, directed by Mert and Marcus, was released on March 20, 2012. The video features Madonna with a number of athletic male dancers and models in different looks, and dancing with Ukrainian group Kazaky. The dancing was performed by the male dancers and Madonna in high stiletto heels, with choreography by Tabitha. It received critical acclaim for the editing and the visuals, while reviewers noted that it took inspiration from Madonna's older videos, such as "Erotica", "Justify My Love", "Human Nature" and "Vogue". "Girl Gone Wild" was performed as the opening song during The MDNA Tour (2012), in a Gothic cathedral setting showing religious iconography, with Madonna her dancers executing choreography in high-heels.

== Background and release ==
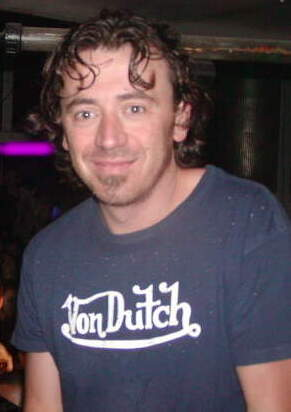
Benny Benassi (pictured) and his cousin Alle Benassi co-wrote and co-produced "Girl Gone Wild" with Madonna.

In December 2010, Madonna posted a message on her Facebook page exclaiming that she was on the lookout for "maddest, sickest, most badass people" as collaborators for making new dance music. On July 4, 2011, her manager Guy Oseary announced that the singer had entered the studio for recording her then unnamed twelfth studio album. Among the collaborators enlisted for the project was Italian record producer Benny Benassi, who at that time was working on the release of his fourth studio album Electroman. His label Ultra Records' head Patrick Moxey felt that the producer's "aggressive" sounds would "work well with some of the major American superstar artists". Moxey asked for some additional tracks from him, and his longtime production partner and cousin, Alle Benassi.

A few demos produced by them were sent to songwriter Jenson Vaughan, who liked the lyrics and the "bass-driven" sound. Vaughan added the top-line on a demo and returned it to Moxey, who shared it with Benassi's European co-manager Paul Sears, who in-turn shared the demo with Oseary. Upon listening, Madonna was impressed with the demos and requested the Benassi Bros. to come to London for a recording session. Moxey commented that the singer "loved [the producer]. Benny is such a quality person; I think that made it all flow so much easier." Two tracks from those sessions, "Girl Gone Wild" and "I'm Addicted", were included on the final track list of the album, named MDNA. Madonna spoke about her experience of collaborating with the Benassi Bros.:

Benny was a tricky one because he doesn't speak English very well. I ended up kind of using his cousin Alle as an interpreter. It was a little bit frustrating at first but eventually we found a way to communicate. You figure out a way. With music it's so much about the vibe and the energy and you know when things are working and when they’re not. When you're working with someone for the first time, there's a kind of shyness that everybody has, so with Benny it was more challenging because of that but we figured it out and by the end I felt like I knew him very well.

A day after Madonna's halftime show performance on the Super Bowl XLVI, the singer confirmed to Ryan Seacrest that "Girl Gone Wild" would be released as the second single from the album. A lyric video for the song was released on February 27, 2012, while it was available for digital download from March 2, 2012, at the iTunes Store. The cover art for the single was released on February 29, 2012. Shot by fashion photographers Mert and Marcus, who had also created the covers for MDNA, the "Girl Gone Wild" artwork showed Madonna wearing lingerie by English retailer Agent Provocateur. She had chosen the brand's "Raphaella" padded bra, made from French corded lace and pleated tulle. Kyle Anderson of Entertainment Weekly praised the artwork saying that the singer "still wears underwear in public better than most women half her age". Billboard writer Gregory DelliCarpini Jr. felt that Madonna portrayed having fun in "racy undies" on the cover, in spite of being a mother. "Is this the 21st century version of her infamous cone bra? Nah, but it made you look [at her]," he concluded.

== Threatened lawsuit ==
On February 4, 2012, Joe Francis, the creator of the Girls Gone Wild video franchisee, threatened to sue Madonna if she sang the song during her halftime show performance. His representatives said that "[Madonna] violated Federal and State trademark laws by making unauthorized use of Mr. Francis' trademark Girls Gone Wild in not only the title, but subject line of her various advertisements in order to lure potential consumers to purchase her latest musical effort." The National Football League (NFL) revealed in their magazine that the song would not be performed at the Super Bowl. On hearing about the allegations, Moxey commented that Francis only wanted attention from the press, adding: "When I looked at ASCAP, I noticed there were approximately 50 records called 'Girls Gone Wild'. This guy just thinks too much of himself."

The song title was slightly modified to the singular "Girl Gone Wild" to which Francis again commented: "Clearly her label was trying to avoid legal action surrounding the song... But [the new title] is still infringement as far as the law is concerned, and we have been in touch with Madonna's people in an effort to resolve this issue." He added that he would pursue new legal action if more changes were not made to the track. Francis' lawyer also said that his client had made a federal trademark for the singular form of the title. Oseary denied that the song's title was changed because of Francis, explaining that Madonna had been completing the final version of MDNA and the renamed title was chosen due to the singular word "girl" in the lyrics. He stated that there are several songs titled "Girls Gone Wild" on iTunes, and that Madonna was not aware of a lawsuit or about Francis. Oseary concluded by saying that the singer was not restricted from performing the song at the Super Bowl, though she did not.

== Recording and composition ==
"Girl Gone Wild" was recorded at MSR Studios, New York City and Sarm West Studios, Notting Hill, London. It was written by Madonna, Vaughan and the Benassi Bros., and was produced by the Benassis and Madonna. Demacio "Demo" Castellon recorded and mixed the track. Philippe Weiss and Graham Archer assisted Castellon on the recording, while Angie Teo assisted on the mixing. Stephen Kozmeniuk did the additional editing of the song and arranged the vocoder. Benny Benassi recalled that Madonna would arrive in the studio around 3–4 pm and would work till 11:30 pm. Together they fixed the production of the song, including the layering and stacking of the track. They added more vocals to the composition and during the chorus, decided on how many voices should be duplicated. According to Alle Benassi, Madonna "has clear idea. She knows very well what she wants: where put something, how, why. It's surreal but impressive."

'Girl Gone Wild'
A 21-second sample of the song's chorus, where Madonna repeats the title name over dance music. The sample also demonstrates the predominant double tracked vocals, especially around the 2:00 mark. Madonna puts stresses of the words on the beat, resulting in an unclear enunciation, as observed by Mike Senior from Sound on Sound.

"Girl Gone Wild" is a midtempo electropop, dance-pop, Euro disco, electro, Euro house and techno party track, drawing influence from four-on-the-floor and having a similar sound to tracks from the singer's tenth studio album, Confessions on a Dance Floor (2005). Jason Lipshutz from Billboard noted that it has a "driving beat" and "propulsive hook" reminiscent of the singer's 2005 single, "Hung Up". The song opens with a prayer, and Madonna uttering "Oh my God, I'm heartily sorry", which was a spoken rendition of the last track, "Act of Contrition", from Madonna's fourth studio album, Like a Prayer (1989). During the middle eight, Madonna talks about how "good girls" should not misbehave. NME contributor Ailbhe Malone noted that the composition featured elements from the singer's previous singles, "Music" (2000) and "Jump" (2006). As she sings "forgive me", the beat drops completely with the music disintegrating. Madonna's vocals are processed to appear thin and stretched out.

According to the sheet music of the song published online by Sony/ATV Music Publishing, "Girl Gone Wild" is set in the time signature of common time, with a moderate tempo of 127 beats per minute. It is composed in the key of A minor with Madonna's vocals ranging from Gm to Dm. The song follows a sequence of G♯m–C♯m–E during the opening prayer verse and Am–Em–G–F for the rest as its chord progression. Mike Senior from Sound on Sound magazine found that along with the predominant synth sounds, there was "a lot" of double tracking present in the song which made the vocals unclear. He felt that this was not pose a problem in stereo sound, but with mono sounds the combined vocals appeared double tracked while the vocal level decreased. The mixing for "Girl Gone Wild" was done mainly for stereo speakers and around the 1:45–2:00 mark, the vocal levels fluctuate with the backing music being dwarfed. Senior also observed that Madonna put the stresses of the words on the beats of the song, hence some of the enunciation are lost with the drum sounds, especially on the title hook.

Lyrically, the song addresses a "good girl gone wild" singing about her "burning hot desire" to have some fun. It was compared to singer Cyndi Lauper's "Girls Just Want to Have Fun" (1983), with lyrics like "Girls, they just wanna have some fun" and "The room is spinning / It must be the Tanqueray / I'm about to go astray / My inhibitions gone away". In the intermediate verses, Madonna utters "forgive me", which is a Catholic term used as a sexual reference. The lyrics, once placed in the context of Madonna's career "attains a new meaning" according to Josh Haigh from Attitude magazine. Explaining it, he said that the meaning behind the lyrics was how Madonna, being a Catholic girl herself, decided that she would not be tied down by anyone else's rules, and consequently became one of the most recognizable musical artists.

== Critical reception ==
The song received mixed reviews from music critics. Keith Caulfied of Billboard deemed it as a "very dance-by-the-numbers with Madonna" song, and further assessed that the chorus made "Girl Gone Wild" a memorable song. Jon Dolan of Rolling Stone rated it three out of five stars. He commended the singer for the electro and Europop composition of the track, describing it as "buoyant and warm-rinse soothing. It's the sound of a woman who hits the dance-floor for restoration more than craziness." Haigh from Attitude believed that "Girl Gone Wild" should have been released as the lead single from MDNA. He felt that the track "screams" early 1990s Madonna's work, and complimented it for being a "basic, balls-to-the-wall night out anthem", adding "why does that have to be something that's considered 'below' Madonna?" In a pre-release screening of MDNA, Matthew Todd from the same magazine praised the "pop stomper" track, writing: "The production might sound like she's been listening to a fair bit of Rihanna, but who's counting. Madonna brings her own authority, creating the kind of anthemic party song that she does best, the kind where everyone from your three-year-old niece to your 60-year-old mother gets up on the dancefloor." MTV News journalist Bradley Stern felt that the composition emulated her single "Celebration" (2009).

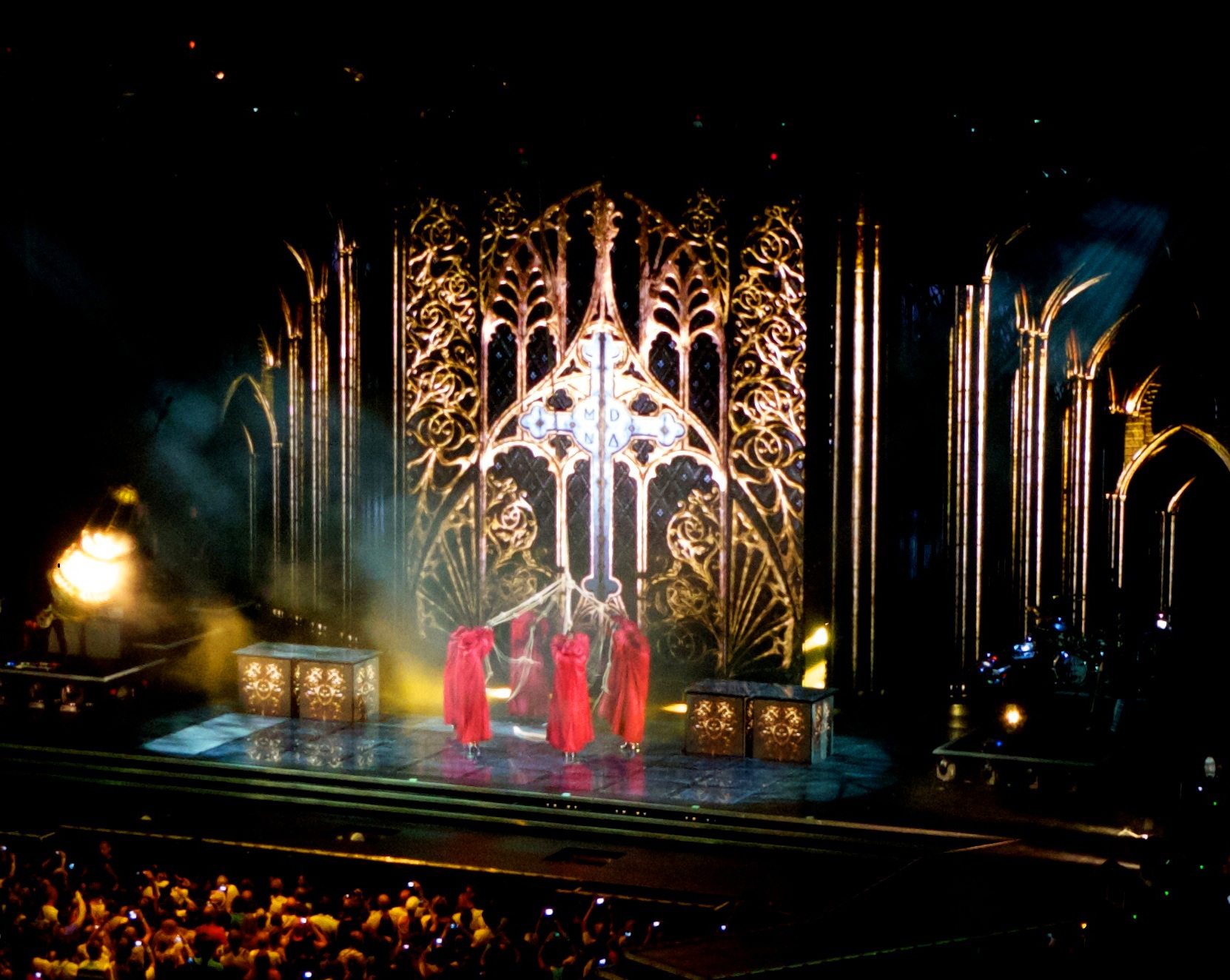
The stage during the opening of "Girl Gone Wild" on The MDNA Tour. It shows the Gothic cathedral setting, and Madonna's dancers swinging the thurible.

A writer for Virgin Media gave the song four out of five stars, writing: "It sounds a tad familiar, not to mention inappropriate in a track named after a US porn-movie series, but Benny Benassi then lifts 'Girl Gone Wild' into a fantastic throbbing Kelis-style dancefloor-filler." Nick Levine, writing for The National, praised the composition saying that it "gets better the more (and louder) you play it". Michael Cragg from The Guardian felt that the song was "more interesting musically", especially during the middle eight. "A signal we're back in Confessions on a Dance Floor territory following the relative misstep of Hard Candy," Cragg concluded. Laurence Green from musicOMH believed that with its nod to Confessions on a Dance Floor and "Get Together", the song was commercial enough to represent the current sound. In a review of MDNA, Neil McCormick of The Daily Telegraph praised the track calling it a "lean, sleek, electro stomper, balancing the twin requirements of radio friendly hooks and dance floor drive". Aidin Vaziri of the San Francisco Chronicle called it "insistent and sleek" but hoped that Madonna would have found different lyrical references than Lauper's song. Matthew Parpetua from Pitchfork praised the Benassis' production, adding that it was worthy of "competing with singers like Kesha, Britney Spears, and Katy Perry on pop radio". Senior from Sound on Sound was pleased with the synth sounds and the departure from the "brightness" of Confessions on a Dance Floor tracks, making it more "palatable".

Slant Magazine's Eric Henderson wrote that "Girl Gone Wild" sounds like a "Tumblr-meme version" of the singer's 2006 single, "Get Together". He added that the release "may not be the nadir of Madonna's career so far, but I can think of few moments that feel as much a betrayal of her legacy than the way she deadpans 'It's so erotic' right before chirping 'This feeling can't be beat'." Robert Copsey of Digital Spy felt the production credits for MDNA had fueled "over-inflated expectations" for the single. Copsey found it was not "forward-thinking" like Madonna's past records and cited the lyrics "Girls they just wanna have some fun / Get fired up like a smoking gun" as an example of this, although he concluded his review writing "we defy anyone who isn't singing this back to themselves immediately after." The New York Observer journalist Daniel D'Addario compared it to "Music", but added that "Madonna was twelve years younger at that time and thus perhaps a more convincing 'bad girl', so too was our culture... maybe it's time for her to try something totally different?" In another article for The Guardian, Gareth Grundy proclaimed "Girl Gone Wild" to be a "clumsy rave-pop", while Amanda Dobbins from New York panned it as a "paint-by-numbers, 808- and Tanqueray-referencing dance track that falls even flatter when compared to its source material". Malone from NME found no innovation in the track, writing, "combined with earlier single 'Give Me All Your Luvin'' it points to an uneasy mix for album MDNA." Margaret Wappler from Los Angeles Times felt that Madonna would have been better re-releasing "Music" again as a single, instead of "Girl Gone Wild". She added that "There's something very attractive about a song this militaristic and precise, but in Madge's too-capable hands it's also suffocatingly professional."

Brad O'Mancey from Popjustice believed that the song failed as an "album opener", but sounds "slightly better" after one finished the whole record. Chicago Tribune journalist Greg Kot believed that unlike Madonna's 80s Catholic imagery, "Girl Gone Wild" does not venture into new territory with its sound. Bernard Zuel of The Sydney Morning Herald found the song "laughable", calling it a "yawning Catholic-girl-in-heat". In another review of the album for BBC News, Levine called it "charmless genero-banger". Alex Macpherson from Fact panned the track, saying that the "rote, lifeless singing on ['Girl Gone Wild'] sounds as though a guide track was mistakenly kept on the finished song, and arguably marks the worst vocal performance Madonna has ever committed to record." Robert Leedham from Drowned in Sound website felt that the song did not represent the album's sound, hence failed as a single to promote it. Jon Pareles from The New York Times called it "shallow, effective club fodder", describing it as containing "blippy stereo-hopping synthesizers and generic title". This view was shared by Emily Mackay of The Quietus, who felt that the song would have been better for another artist and was below Madonna's level. Jude Rogers from The Guardian wrote that "the filter sweeps used brilliantly throughout Confessions on a Dance Floor don't sparkle here", calling it a "mediocre banger with a terrible title"; nonetheless, she placed the song at number 73 on her ranking of Madonna's singles, in honor of her 60th birthday.

== Chart performance ==
"Girl Gone Wild" debuted at number six on the Bubbling Under Hot 100 and at number 33 on the Pop Digital Songs charts on the issue dated March 17, 2012, with 22,000 downloads sold according to Nielsen SoundScan. The song debuted at number 86 on the Canadian Hot 100, peaking at 42 on the chart and was present for a total of nine weeks. "Girl Gone Wild" also debuted at number 46 on Hot Dance Club Songs, eventually reaching the top of the chart in its fifth week. It was the second Dance Club Songs chart topper from MDNA, following first single, "Give Me All Your Luvin'", which had peaked at number-one three weeks prior. Madonna also had her quickest span of back-to-back number-ones since 1990, when "Vogue" reached the top of the charts just seven weeks after "Keep It Together". With "Girl Gone Wild" reaching the top, Madonna achieved a record 73rd week atop the ranking. At the 2012 Year-end tabulation of the top Hot Dance Club Songs, "Girl Gone Wild" was ranked at number 44. The song debuted at number 38 on the US Mainstream Top 40 chart due to radio airplay, becoming her first album since Music (2000) to have two singles enter that chart. She is also the fifth artist to score a song on the list as far back as the 90s.

In the United Kingdom it entered the UK Singles Chart at number 73. It was the third single from MDNA to chart there, following "Give Me All Your Luvin'" and "Masterpiece". It also had a low peak on the Irish Singles Chart, entering and peaking at number 93. On the South Korea Gaon Digital Chart, "Girl Gone Wild" debuted and peaked at number seven, with sales of 30,512 copies. It went on to sell more than 60,000 copies in the nation. "Girl Gone Wild" also reached the top-ten of the charts in Greece, Hungary, Italy, Russia, Spain, South Africa and the IFPI charts in Slovakia. It received a Platinum certification from the Federazione Industria Musicale Italiana (FIMI) for sales of over 30,000 digital downloads.

== Music video ==
=== Background and development ===
Madonna dancing with Kazaky during a sequence in the music video, portraying the "platinum bombshell" look

During her interview with Ryan Seacrest, Madonna confirmed that a music video for "Girl Gone Wild" would be filmed during the week of February 17, 2012. Oseary confirmed through Twitter that Mert and Marcus were enlisted as the video directors. The singer also recruited Ukrainian dance group Kazaky to appear with her in the video. Madonna was inspired by the androgynous portrayal of the group, since they danced in high-heels but appeared masculine in their appearance with muscular bodies. Tabitha, the choreographer of the video, recalled that since Madonna was a professional dancer, she added elements of her own characteristic routines in the choreography. "Madonna is a mover, so there were definitely moments that wasn't choreographed and was her being raw," Tabitha added.

Madonna also enlisted male models Brad Alphonso, Jon Kortajarena, Rob Evans, Sean O'Pry and Simon Nessman. In the video, Madonna sported a brassiere designed by Agent Provocateur. The singer's stilettos, which were custom-made by footwear designer Paola Bay, consisted of black silk embroidered with silver threading. "She wanted them as high as possible and to be able to dance with them on," stated Bay. "We did three fittings to make sure they were like second skin." Arianne Phillips, dress designer for the video, recalled that she had to create custom-made high-heeled stilettos for Kazaky, because of unavailability of shoes in their size. Artur Gaspar from the band recalled that "By the end of the day on set, our feet were bleeding and we had blisters... But if Madonna can repeat the dancing for the 50th time, why can't we?" Phillips explained that they had created three different looks for Madonna in the video. The first was called a "super vixen" look for which she created short tops that could be worn as brassiere. Hairstylist Andy Lecompte wanted to go for a 1960s style with it. The second look portrayed was called "rockstar" for which designer Michael Smith created T-shirts out of metal mesh, while Lecompte cut the singer's hair short, so that it would resemble her early look. The final look was called the "platinum bombshell", and was inspired by Marilyn Monroe.

=== Release and synopsis ===
A 30-second teaser video was released on March 9, 2012. The full video debuted on E! News on March 20, 2012, and became available on their website shortly afterwards. Shot completely in black-and-white, the music video is polar opposite to the colorful, football-themed video for previous single "Give Me All Your Luvin'". Instead of having a plot, the video is an assortment of imagery referring to the singer's early works.

The video opens with Madonna in the "platinum bombshell" look uttering the opening prayers of the song. As the music starts she is shown in the other looks, performing yoga poses, while intercepting scenes show the male models in provocative poses. Other scenes show Madonna dancing against a wall, smoking a cigarette, and being bound to a chain. Kazaky appears during the first chorus and perform a dance routine in the heels. While Madonna sings the second verse, she is surrounded by the male models, who are almost nude. The singer joins Kazaky during the chorus emulating the choreography with them. Interspersed are scenes of Madonna playing with a fog machine billowing smoke.

During the intermediate break, one of the male models is shown nude and wearing a crown of thorns on his head, while Madonna gets caressed by the others. The final sequence of the video shows the singer dancing energetically with Kazaky, with the fog machine and the male models who grind against each other. "Girl Gone Wild" ends with Madonna dropping the fog machine and a final scene showing the singer's face with black colored tears pouring from her eyes.

=== Analysis and reception ===
John Mitchell from MTV News observed five main influences from Madonna's past behind the video. He explained that references from the singer's music video for the 1992 song "Erotica" are present with Madonna's "platinum bombshell" look as well as scenes of leather-underwear wearing men and S&M. The choreography had direct references to the "Vogue" (1990) music video, and the gay eroticism was also displayed in both of them. For Mitchell, the video for "Human Nature" (1995) is referenced with Madonna's latex clothing and portions showing the singer against a white background. The "Justify My Love" (1990) video had scenes of orgy in it, similar to the scenes of Madonna being caressed by her dancers in "Girl Gone Wild", towards the end. Mitchell concluded by saying that the crown of thorns directly referenced the religious iconography in the singer's "Like a Prayer" (1989) video.

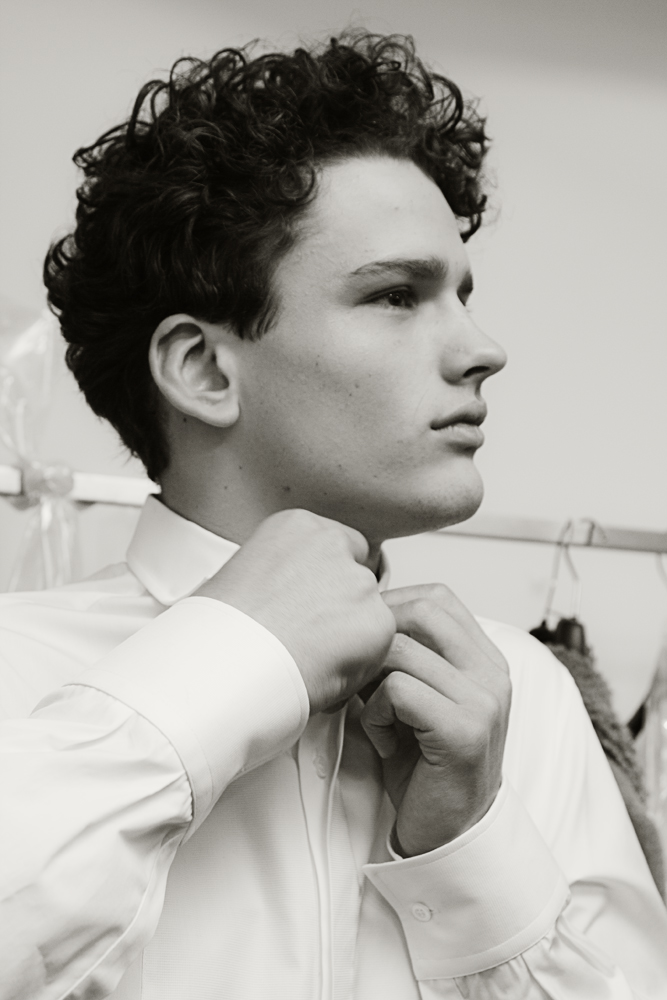
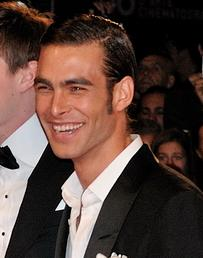
Models Simon Nessman (left) and Jon Kortajarena (right) appeared in the music video.

In another article, Jocelyn Vena from MTV News thought that the video was "the perfect homage" to the singer's Sex book and her Erotica (1992) days, describing it as "crunchy, sexy and edgy". Sophie A. Schillaci of The Hollywood Reporter noted references to the music video for "Like a Prayer" (1989). E! contributor Nathalie Finn commented: "Madonna doesn't need a song to tell us she's ready to dance all night—just one look at her and you figure she could outlast the average partyer under any circumstances". She added that the references to her old work, as well as the half-nude men indicated that "it isn't just the girls 'who wanna have some fun'."

Ethan Sack from New York Daily News said that "it's a tossup over who looks better in tights and high-heels, the 53-year-old Material Girl or the bevy of shirtless male dancers who gyrate around her." Lanford Beard of Entertainment Weekly praised the video saying that it "shows Madonna looking the best she has since at least 2005's video for 'Hung Up'. Of course there is the requisite writhing, hip grinding, a rousing dance sequence, and a smoldering mantourage. It is, in a word, awesome". HitFix's Melinda Newman praised the direction by Mert and Marcus, feeling that "the clip is a luscious collection of erotic images: two men biting an apple together, backlit men dancing in high heels, and Madge, looking as if she’s a dewy 25-year old." A review in The Week praised the video for being self-referential with its "dark, dominatrix-y" visuals. Amanda Dobbins from New York magazine gave a positive review for the appearance of Kazaky and Madonna's look in the video. Caryn Ganz from Spin noticed that along with her old videos, Madonna also referenced her contemporary releases, like the videos for "Give It 2 Me" (2008) and "Celebration", with the scenes showing her "incredible" dancing alone.

The video was chosen by fans, in a Billboard poll for Madonna's best videos, as her sixth best effort of all time, in honor of her 54th birthday. At the 2013 International Dance Music Awards, the video was nominated in the categories of Best Dance Music Video and Best Pop Music Video, but failed to win either of them. Shortly after "Girl Gone Wild"'s release to YouTube on March 21, 2012, the video was rated by many viewers as inappropriate. This caused YouTube to set an age restriction, only allowing those of age 18 or older to view the video. According to the website, the video was labeled explicit because of the "raunchy" and "orgy" scenes, thereby blocking it from getting uploaded to the singer's Vevo account. YouTube also asked Madonna's representative to upload a more PG-rated version. Madonna later commented, "What's wrong with... what grinding? I'm supposed to be a 'girl gone wild' in the video—how can I go wild and not grind? This is the question that people should be asking." During her interview with Jimmy Fallon on Facebook, Madonna jokingly confessed that if she were president, "There would be no restrictions whatsoever on any of my videos, ever". Jane Martinson of The Guardian expressed her disappointment with the ban, since she felt there were far more provocative content in YouTube than Madonna's video. Martinson also noted that the semi-nudity in question came from the men featured in the clip, and felt that Madonna had turned Francis' concept of girls going wild, to "[girls who] can also be the ones in control. I watched the video ready to slate her and came away thinking, after 30 years Madonna can still show Rihanna how sex and music can subvert expectations."

== Live performance ==
Madonna's first performance of "Girl Gone Wild" was on The MDNA Tour (2012) as the concert's opening track. The performance was choreographed by Jason Young and Alison Faulk, along with dancer Derrell Bullock, who assisted as supervisor. According to Faulk, Madonna asked Bullock to experiment with the concept of "girl gone wild", and come up with a routine and style of his own. He wanted to find a story with the dancing and presented his moves to Madonna the next day. The singer also wanted to experiment with the concept of Catholic church, along with monks and gargoyles. Her message behind it was that of freedom, "people getting to do whatever they wanted to". Four dancers from Brooklyn, adept at bone breaking dance, were enlisted as backup crew for the performance. Young recalled that they could "create these abstract, very animalistic shapes. What they can do with their arms is unbelievable. Anything that most people can do in front of their bodies, they do it behind their bodies." The dancing required the boys to put on heels like Kazaky in the music video. Most of them refused to abide by it, resulting in Madonna giving them a choice to put the heels and dance or leave the show. The dancers complied and learned the choreography.

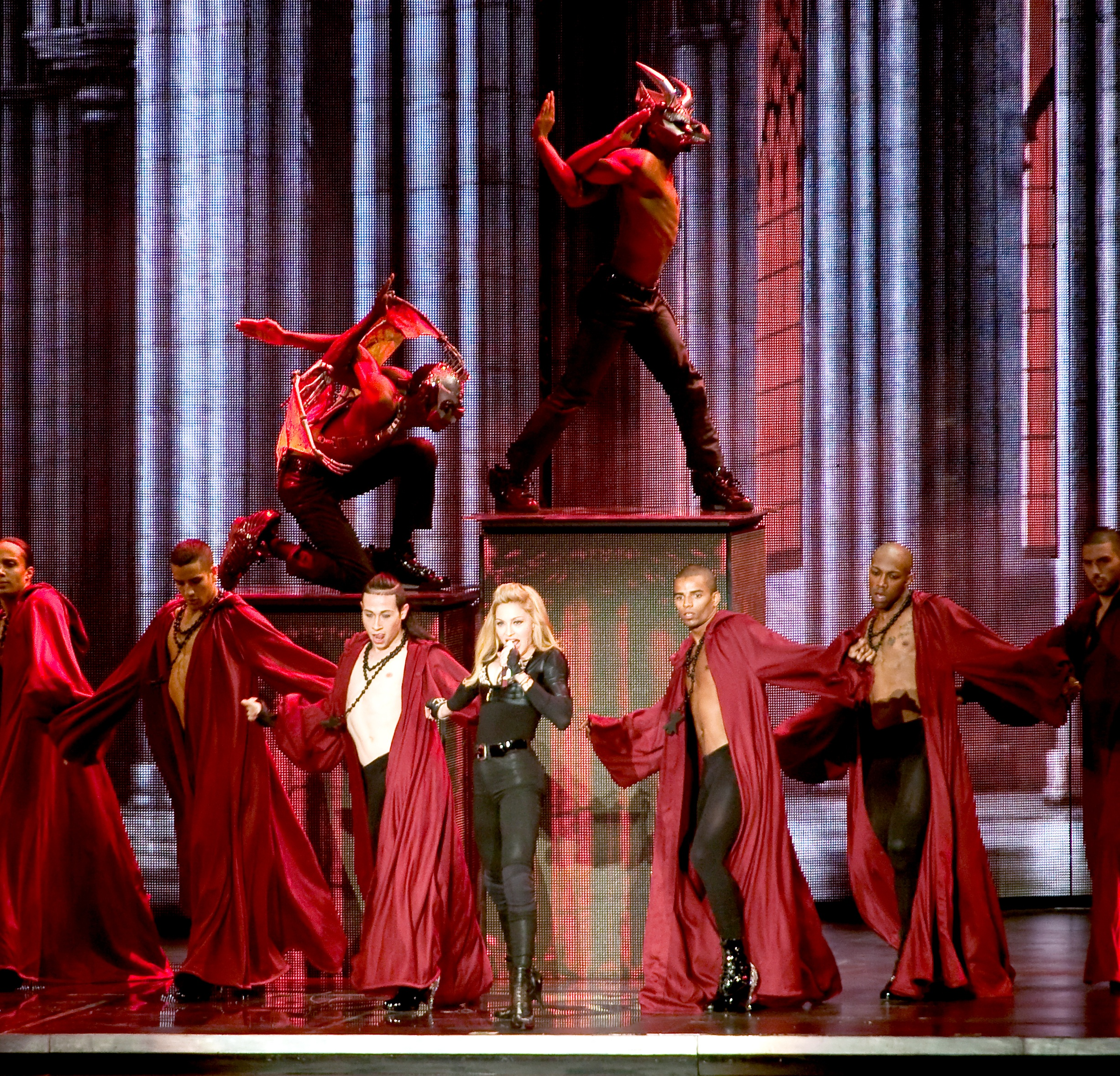
Madonna and her dancers, dressed as monks, begin The MDNA Tour with the performance of "Girl Gone Wild". Behind her are the contortionists on the moving blocks, portraying gargoyles.

The show began with a gothic cathedral setting, which was developed by Tait Towers, a production management company. They used ScreenWorks 10mm video screens with an integrated active cooling system designed to dissipate captured heat from LED tiles. The main screens could move up and down, thus creating a moving cathedral setting and steps. Onstage several dancers wearing buddhist and Christian monks' robes swung a giant thurible back and forth, as it burnt incense and appeared to cleanse the venue. The Kalakan Trio then appeared dressed in religious robes with huge head dresses, chanting excerpts from "Lekhah Dodi", as the backdrop screens showed a huge cross with the letters MDNA. The religious chants eventually morph into chants of Madonna's name, as the two main backdrop screens split open to reveal a giant confessional, covered by a scrim at the front. Madonna was present inside kneeling down and praying, while the confessional was lowered to the stage with the song's opening monologue in the background. The singer was decked in a gold crown with a black veil, a tight black shirt with a leopard-printed bra peeking out from the top, leather arm bands and black skinny jeans and black high-heel boots. Madonna pretended to smash and break through the glass window of the confessional with a large rifle and proceeded to perform the song accompanied by a troupe of shirtless dancers wearing high heels, doing a choreography similar to the song's music video. The song was arranged to include musical elements of "Material Girl" (1985) and "Give It 2 Me" (2008). Moving blocks and contortionist dancers dressed up as gargoyles were also present in the performance. "Girl Gone Wild" ended with Madonna grabbing another rifle and pretending to shoot at the crowd, giving way to the second performance of the show, "Revolver". The performance of the song at the November 19–20, 2012 shows in Miami, at the American Airlines Arena, were recorded and released in Madonna's fourth live album, MDNA World Tour.

Shawn Kellner from the Chicago Music Magazine praised the costumes and the dancing, while Jodi Duckett from The Morning Call felt that the "characters that looked like Tibetan monks [...], the gonging of bells and Madonna arriving in a gilded cage" made the performance seem "very 'Da Vinci Code' like". Kitty Empire from The Guardian received the usage of guns negatively, saying that Madonna's son Rocco would be "perfectly blasé about the prospect of the former Mrs. Ritchie shooting her way out of a confessional booth with a machine gun, as she does on the set opener". Barry Walters from MuuMuse called the opening sequence as "manic" and called it a "power punch" sequence along with "Revolver". Barbara Vandenburgh from The Arizona Republic called the performance as "raucous". Shirley Halperin from The Hollywood Reporter was confused as how the religious iconography portrayed during the performance was tied to the song's theme of a "girl gone wild". San Jose Mercury News editor Jim Harrington called the selection of "Girl Gone Wild" as "commonplace". Jim Farber from New York Daily News described the performance as transitioning from a girl gone wild to "girl gone bloodthirsty" with the subsequent violence depictions. Ben Crandell from Florida's Sun-Sentinel newspaper observed that Madonna turned around the "solemn" introduction to a dance number with "Girl Gone Wild". According to her the performance portrayed Madonna as "fashionable, powerful, but vulnerable sex toy", which became "an ongoing theme for the night".

== Track listing and formats ==
- CD Single / 12" Picture Disc
1. "Girl Gone Wild" (Album Version) – 3:43
2. "Girl Gone Wild" (Justin Cognito Extended Remix) – 4:48
- CD Maxi-Single / iTunes Digital Remixes
1. "Girl Gone Wild" (Madonna vs Avicii – Avicii's UMF Mix) – 5:16
2. "Girl Gone Wild" (Dave Audé Remix) – 8:05
3. "Girl Gone Wild" (Justin Cognito Remix) – 4:48
4. "Girl Gone Wild" (Kim Fai Remix) – 6:33
5. "Girl Gone Wild" (Lucky Date Remix) – 5:06
6. "Girl Gone Wild" (Offer Nissim Remix) – 6:49
7. "Girl Gone Wild" (Dada Life Remix) – 5:15
8. "Girl Gone Wild" (Rebirth Remix) – 6:49

== Credits and personnel ==
Credits adapted from the liner notes of MDNA.

- Madonna – lead vocals, songwriter, producer
- Jenson Vaughan – songwriter
- Alessandro "Alle" Benassi – songwriter, producer
- Marco "Benny" Benassi – songwriter, producer
- Demacio "Demo" Castellon – recording, mixing for The Demolition Crew
- Philippe Weiss – recording
- Graham Archer – recording
- Angie Teo – recording
- Stephen "The Koz" Kozmeniuk – editing, vocoder for The Demolition Crew
- Mert and Marcus – cover art photographer

== Charts ==
=== Weekly charts ===
Weekly chart performance for "Girl Gone Wild"
Chart (2012)	Peak position
Australia (ARIA)	93
Austria (Ö3 Austria Top 40)	62
Belgium (Ultratop 50 Flanders)	25
Belgium (Ultratop 50 Wallonia)	28
Brazil Hot 100 Airplay (Billboard)	8
Canada Hot 100 (Billboard)	42
Canada CHR/Top 40 (Billboard)	47
Canada Hot AC (Billboard)	44
CIS Airplay (TopHit)	58
Croatia International Airplay (HRT)	1
Czech Republic Airplay (ČNS IFPI)	85
Finland (Suomen virallinen lista)	13
France (SNEP)	13
Global Dance Songs (Billboard)	1
Greece Digital Songs (Billboard)	5
Hungary (Single Top 40)	4
Israel (Media Forest)	8
Ireland (IRMA)	93
Italy (FIMI)	4
Italy Airplay (EarOne)	10
Japan Hot 100 (Billboard)	17
Mexico (Billboard Mexican Airplay)	44
Netherlands (Dutch Top 40 Tipparade)	9
Netherlands (Single Top 100)	66
Poland Dance (ZPAV)	12
Russia Airplay (TopHit)	96
Russia (Digital Chart)	5
Slovakia Airplay (ČNS IFPI)	10
South Korea (Gaon)	10
South Africa (EMA)	6
Spain (Promusicae)	7
Spanish Albums (Promusicae) "Girl Gone Wild" 12" picture disc	40
Sweden (Sverigetopplistan)	38
Switzerland (Schweizer Hitparade)	29
UK Singles (Official Charts)	73
Ukraine Airplay (TopHit)	12
US Bubbling Under Hot 100 (Billboard)	6
US Dance Club Songs (Billboard)	1
US Dance Singles Sales (Billboard)	3
US Dance Airplay (Billboard)	15
US Hot Singles Sales (Billboard)	7
US Pop Airplay (Billboard)	38

=== Year-end charts ===
Year-end chart performance for "Girl Gone Wild"
Chart (2012)	Position
Belgium Dance (Ultratop 50 Flanders)	55
Belgium Dance (Ultratop 50 Wallonia)	39
France (SNEP)	129
Hungary (Rádiós Top 40)	53
Italy (FIMI)	36
Poland (Singles Top 50)	46
Ukraine Airplay (TopHit)	181
US Hot Dance Club Songs (Billboard)	44

== Certifications and sales ==
Certifications and sales for "Girl Gone Wild"
Region	Certification	Certified units/sales
Brazil (Pro-Música Brasil)	Platinum	60,000^{‡}
Italy (FIMI)	Platinum	30,000^{*}
South Korea (Gaon)	—	67,289
^{*} Sales figures based on certification alone.^{‡} Sales+streaming figures based on certification alone.

== Release history ==
Release dates for "Girl Gone Wild"
Region	Date	Format
Canada	March 2, 2012	Digital download
Mexico	March 2, 2012	Digital download
United States	March 2, 2012	Digital download
Australia	March 19, 2012	Digital download
Germany	March 19, 2012	Digital download
Italy	March 19, 2012	Digital download
Spain	March 19, 2012	Digital download
Japan	March 19, 2012	Digital download
New Zealand	March 19, 2012	Digital download
Argentina	March 19, 2012	Digital download
Brazil	March 19, 2012	Digital download
El Salvador	March 19, 2012	Digital download
Italy	March 23, 2012	Contemporary hit radio
United States	March 27, 2012	Contemporary hit radio
Poland	April 17, 2012	CD single
France	April 23, 2012	CD single
Germany	May 4, 2012	CD single
United Kingdom	May 14, 2012	CD single

== See also ==
- Artists with the most number-ones on the U.S. dance chart
- List of number-one dance singles of 2012 (U.S.)
