= Taylor Fuchs =

Canadian model (born 1987)

- Born: Taylor Brett Fuchs; January 17, 1987 (age 39); White City, Saskatchewan
- Modeling information
- Height: 6 ft 2 in (1.88 m)
- Hair color: Brown
- Eye color: Blue
- Agency: IMG Models (New York); Success Models (Paris); Why Not Model Management (Milan); Sight Management Studio (Barcelona); Mega Model Agency (Hamburg)

Taylor Brett Fuchs (born January 17, 1987) is a Canadian model.

He began his career as a young model at the age of twenty by signing a contract with the modeling agency Public Image Worldwide. In 2007, he made his debut for the companies Burberry, Dolce & Gabbana, Fendi, and Lindberg. During the same time, he also appeared in the magazines 10 men and GQ. In 2008, he became a testimonial for advertising campaigns by Dolce & Gabbana of Gianfranco Ferré of Benetton and Valentino (along with Angela Lindvall and Isabeli Fontana). In the same year, he paraded in Missoni Moschino and Valentino with New Orleans, Paris, Lacoste, and John Varvatos to New York City. In addition, Fuchs paraded Bensimon Argentina in 2009. He also appeared on the cover of Number, photographed by Greg Kadel.

In August, he passed by the prestigious Public Image Worldwide Wilhelmina Models, and was named by Forbes magazine as male model of 2008 becoming one of the most successful male models. The following year he achieved ninth place.

== Agencies ==
- Wilhelmina Models
- Public Image Worldwide - New York City
- Why Not Model Agency
