= Giovanni Borgato =

Italian footballer

Personal information
- Date of birth: 10 January 1897
- Place of birth: Venice, Kingdom of Italy
- Date of death: 1975 (aged 77–78)
- Position: Defender

Senior career*
Years	Team	Apps	(Gls)
1914–1915	Venezia		
1919–1922	Venezia		
1923–1928	Bologna	107	(0)
1928–1929	Fiorentina	15	(0)

International career
1926	Italy	1	(0)
- * Club domestic league appearances and goals

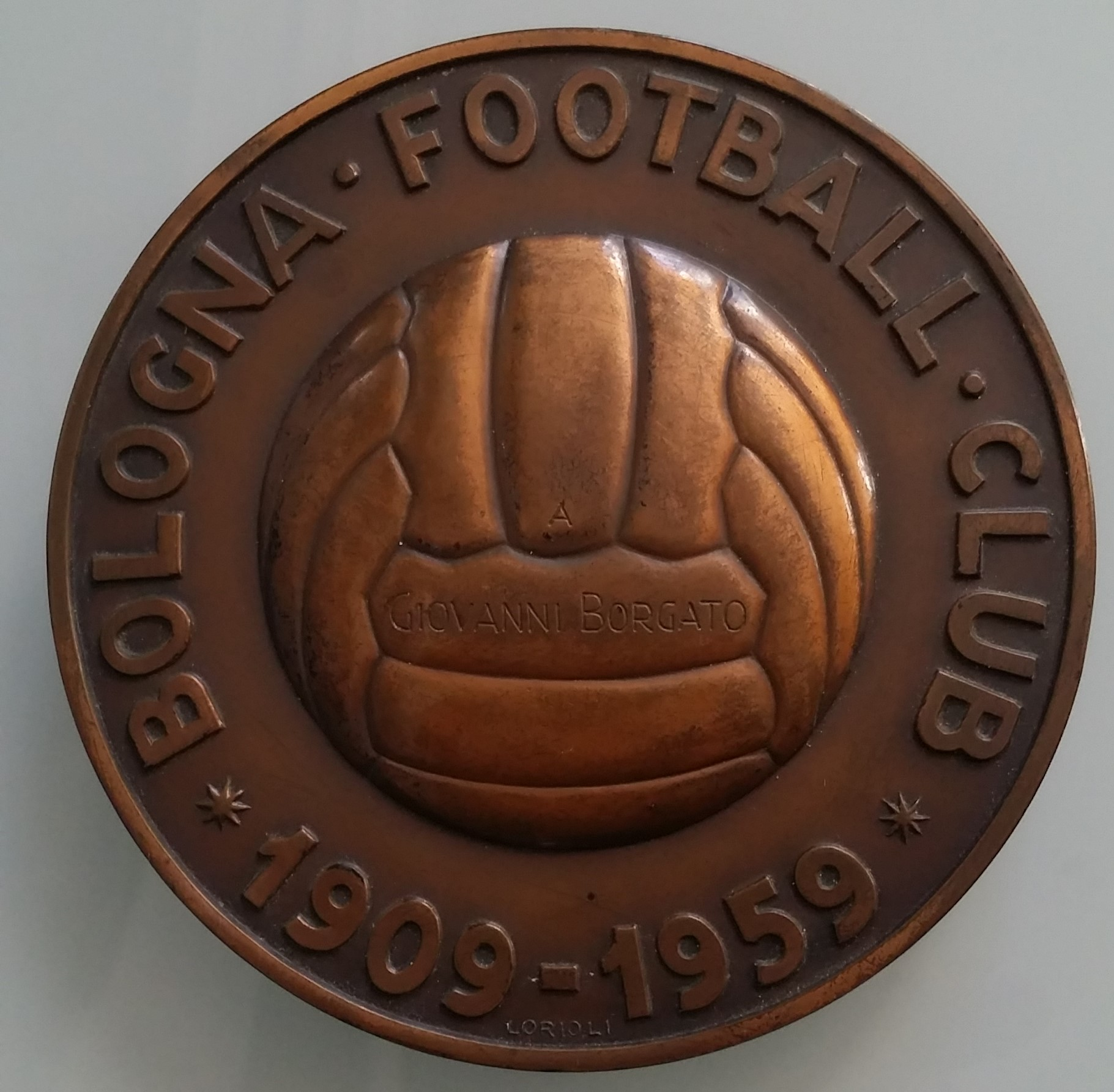

Giovanni Borgato (Italian pronunciation: [dʒoˈvanni borˈɡaːto]; 10 January 1897 – 1975) was an Italian professional footballer who played as a defender.

He played for 5 seasons for Bologna F.C. 1909, winning the championship in the 1924–25 season.

He made his only appearance for the Italy national football team on 18 April 1926 in a game against Switzerland.
