= Sean O'Pry =

American model (born 1989)

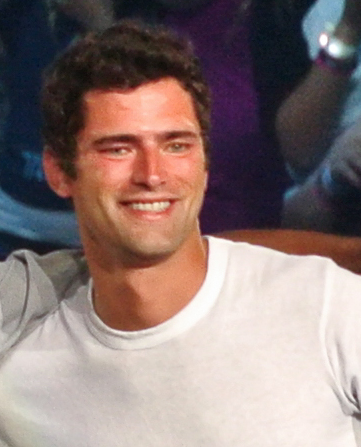
- O'Pry in 2015
- Born: Sean Richard O'Pry; July 5, 1989 (age 37); Kennesaw, Georgia, U.S.
- Other names: Sean Opry, Sean-O
- Modeling information
- Height: 6 ft 1 in (1.85 m)
- Hair color: Brown
- Eye color: Blue

Sean Richard O'Pry (born July 5, 1989) is an American supermodel. He began his modelling career in 2006 and has featured in numerous advertising campaigns and editorials. In 2015, O'Pry was included on Models.com's new 'Supers Men', 'Sexiest Men', and the 'Money Guys' lists. That same year, Vogue ranked him fifth on the 'Top 10 Male Models of All Time'. In 2013, Forbes named him the best-paid male model.

== Early life ==
O'Pry reports having Irish and unspecified Native American heritage. He has an elder brother and a younger sister. He attended North Cobb High School. He played track and field, basketball, baseball, and football in high school.

== Career ==
In 2006, 17-year-old O'Pry was scouted from his prom photos on MySpace.

Since then, O'Pry has been featured in numerous advertising campaigns and editorials for Calvin Klein, Giorgio Armani, Versace, Dolce & Gabbana, Ralph Lauren, Gianfranco Ferré, H&M, Massimo Dutti, Zara, Armani Jeans, Marc Jacobs, Emporio Armani, Lacoste, DSquared², American Eagle, Bottega Veneta, DKNY, Fendi, GQ, Dazed & Confused, V, Details, Barneys, Uniqlo, Bloomingdale's, Belstaff, D2, Arena, Diesel, Gap, JOOP! and Numéro Homme.

His runway credentials include opening Versace, Yves Saint Laurent, Givenchy and Salvatore Ferragamo, closing Moschino, Trussardi and Zegna, and both for Balmain. Other designers he has walked for include Roberto Cavalli, Louis Vuitton, Chanel, Michael Kors, and Hermès. In November 2011, O'Pry was selected as the star of Viktor & Rolf's Spicebomb fragrance campaign.

O'Pry appeared in Madonna's music video "Girl Gone Wild" (2012). He also appeared in Taylor Swift's music video for her song "Blank Space" (2014), as her love interest.

Sean appeared on the June 26, 2016 episode "inauguration" on the HBO television show Veep playing a male intern.

In 2026, O'Pry became the subject of a viral meme when one of his photoshoots was edited on social media by a TikTok user while putting the song Trndsttr by Black Coast, M. Maggie, and Lucian on said edit. The video became a humorous meme that other users on platforms such as TikTok, Instagram, Twitter, and other social medias would regularly display text on about specific things they don't enjoy before one specific hobby they do enjoy would appear, letting the edit commence.

== "Looksmaxxing" idol ==
As of late 2023, O'Pry and other popular male models saw a resurgence in online popularity - primarily as a result of the "looksmaxxing" community of young men. O'Pry and others have been venerated by these communities due to their facial/physical aesthetics and perceived ability to "mog" (outshine) others - due to these characteristics.

O'Pry has responded with criticism to this veneration: "For me that's not acceptable as a person. Like I've never in my life gone into a room, and thought I was better than somebody because of an aesthetic." said O'Pry in a 2024 podcast.

== Achievements ==
In 2008, O'Pry was named the world's eighth most successful male model by Forbes magazine. Only one year later, he had moved up to the #1 position on their list. As of September 2013, Models.com named O'Pry as the most successful male model in the world on their 'Top 50' list. As of 2014, he had held that position for two years.

In 2015, O'Pry was included on Models.com's new 'Supers Men', 'Sexiest Men', and the 'Money Guys' lists. That same year, Vogue, ranked him fifth on the 'Top 10 Male Models of All Time'.

== Filmography ==
=== Film and television ===
Year	Title	Role	Notes
2009	Innocent	—N/a	
2016	Veep	Brady	
2016	XOXO	DJ Polaroid	
2023	Eileen	—N/a	
2026	Germany's Next Topmodel	Guest judge	
TBA	Rose Hill	Ford Grant Jr.	Filming; main role

=== Music video ===
Year	Title	Performer	Ref.
2012	"Girl Gone Wild"	Madonna	
2014	"Blank Space"	Taylor Swift	
