= List of male underwear models =

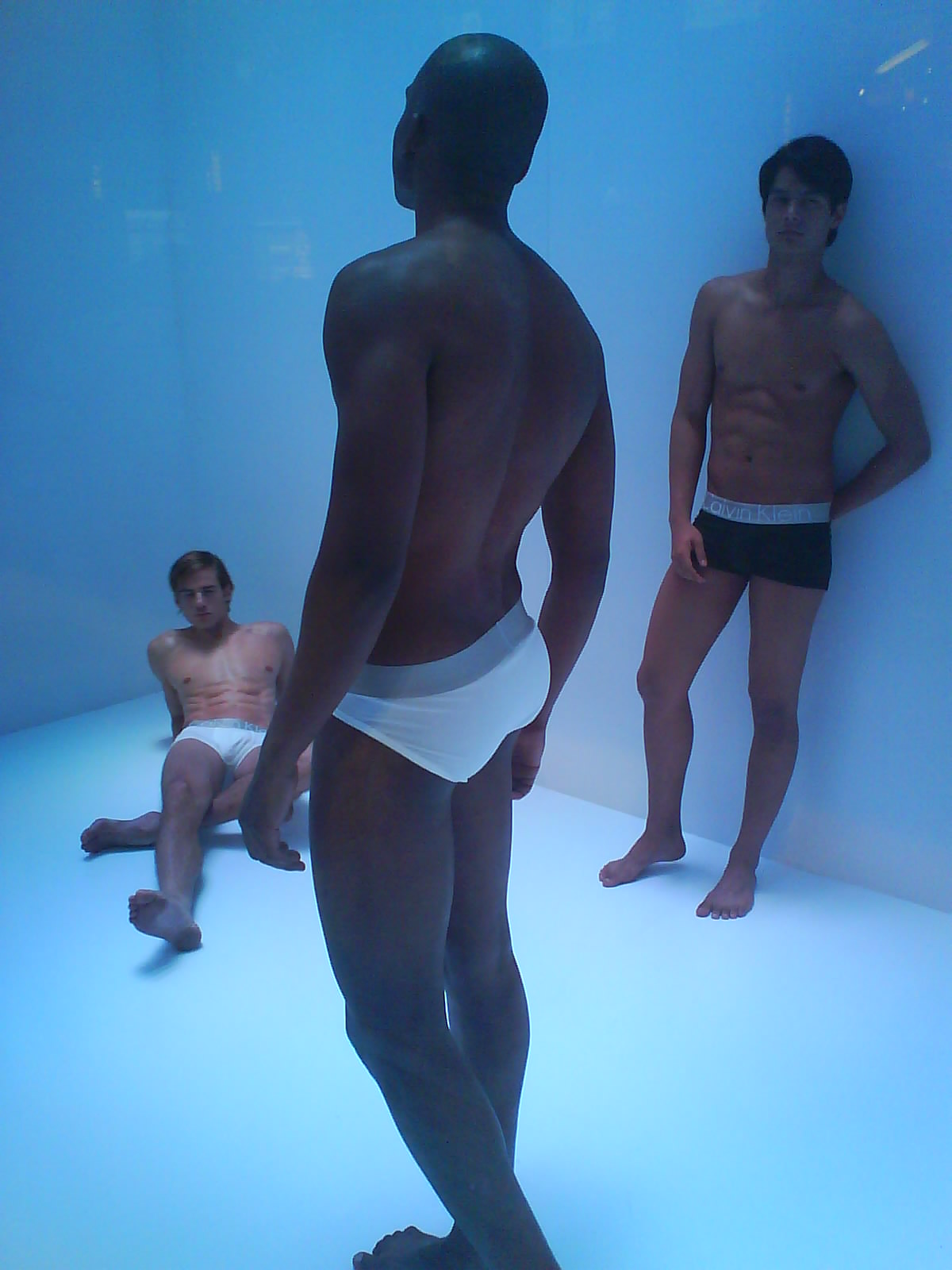
Male models wearing underpants

The following is a list of male underwear models. This is not a complete list and includes men who have modeled underwear as well as fashion apparel from all over the world. This list excludes models dedicated to pornographic and erotic photography, who may pose in underwear, but the final purpose is to see them naked.

Contents

A–F G–L M–R S–Z

== List of male underwear models ==
=== A–F ===
- Yahya Abdul-Mateen II
- Ronald Acuña Jr.
- Nathan Aké
- Carlos Alcaraz
- Olly Alexander
- David Allen
- Trent Alexander-Arnold
- KJ Apa
- Mantas Armalis
- François Arnaud
- Jake Arrieta
- A$AP Rocky
- Nicholas L. Ashe
- Gregg Avedon
- Gabriel Aubry
- Omar Ayuso
- Bad Bunny
- Michael Ballack
- Tyson Ballou
- Nigel Barker
- Beauden Barrett
- Jordan Barrett
- Jimmy Bartel
- Nick Bateman
- Eugen Bauder
- bbno$
- Noah Beck
- Tyson Beckford
- David Beckham
- Odell Beckham Jr.
- Josh Beech
- Tony Bellew
- Jude Bellingham
- Michael Bergin
- Matteo Berrettini
- Justin Bieber
- Andre Birleanu
- Oliver Bjerrehuus
- Manuele Blasi
- Travis Boak
- Simone Bolelli
- Kirk Bondad
- Eyal Booker
- General Booty
- Aly Borromeo
- Nick Bosa
- Pietro Boselli
- Adonis Bosso
- Frederick Bousquet
- Anthony Bowens
- Sergey Boytsov
- Nick Bracks
- Bar Brimer
- Mehcad Brooks
- Chad Buchanan
- Bach Buquen
- Lars Burmeister
- Royce Cabrera
- Cody Calafiore
- Riccardo Calafiori
- J. P. Calderon
- Gonzalo Canale
- Fabio Cannavaro
- Keith Carlos
- Kacey Carrig
- Brydon Carse
- Dan Carter
- Matty Cash
- Luciano Castro
- Anthony Catanzaro
- Matt Cedeño
- Noah Centineo
- Nacer Chadli
- Will Chalker
- Alex Cheesman
- Oliver Cheshire
- Vachirawit Chivaaree
- Michael Clarke
- Stacy Clausen
- Ben Cohen
- Carlton Cole
- Harry Collett
- Bart Conner
- Mark Consuelos
- Gianluca Conte
- Casey Conway
- Vito Coppola
- Tiago Correa
- Jai Courtney
- Roger Craig
- Domenico Criscito
- Maxx Crosby
- Fabián Cubero
- Nick Cummins
- Francesco Cura
- Josh Daicos
- Tom Daley
- Denis Dallan
- John Daly
- Heath Davidson
- Pete Davidson
- Alberto de la Bella
- Justin Deeley
- Steven Dehler
- Thomas Dekker
- Sergei Demekhine
- Sergiño Dest
- Varun Dhawan
- Aarón Díaz
- Landon Dickerson
- Nyle DiMarco
- Grigor Dimitrov
- Antonio Di Natale
- Diplo
- Landon Donovan
- Trevor Donovan
- Hunter Doohan
- Jamie Dornan
- Luca Dotto
- Caeleb Dressel
- Didier Drogba
- Josh Duhamel
- Sandor Earl
- Amro El Geziry
- Omar El Geziry
- Jacob Elordi
- Oscar Emboaba
- Max Emerson
- Boomer Esiason
- Neil Etheridge
- Samuel Eto'o
- Luke Evans
- Thom Evans
- Urijah Faber
- Edison Fan
- Robert Farah
- Herbie Farnworth
- Ansu Fati
- Will Ferrell
- Dominic Fike
- Travis Fimmel
- Kevin Fletcher
- Brandon Flynn
- Pierson Fodé
- Ben Foden
- Fabio Fognini
- DJ Forbes
- Mark Foster
- Taylor Fritz
- David Fumero
- Nolan Gerard Funk

=== G–L ===
- Ezio Galon
- Jan-Michael Gambill
- David Gandy
- Angelo Garcia
- Richard Gasquet
- Justin Gaston
- Gennaro Gattuso
- Ashley Gibson
- Shai Gilgeous-Alexander
- Julián Gil
- Fabien Gilot
- Giuseppe Giofrè
- Robbie G.K.
- Daniel Goddard
- Walton Goggins
- Aaron Gordon
- Colin Grafton
- Steve Grand
- Ethan James Green
- Jalen Green
- Riley Green
- GRiZ
- Rob Gronkowski
- Rodrigo Guirao
- Tommy Haas
- John Halls
- Anthony Harding
- Bryce Harper
- Calvin Harris
- Josh Hart
- James Haskell
- Ross Haslam
- Stuart Hatton
- Kai Havertz
- Son Heung-min
- Tom Hiddleston
- Tomás Valdemar Hintnaus
- Keegan Hirst
- Jordan Houlden
- Djimon Hounsou
- Dwight Howard
- Eddie Huang
- Broderick Hunter
- Aidan Hutchinson
- Adam Hyde
- Vincenzo Iaquinta
- Zlatan Ibrahimović
- Christof Innerhofer
- Robert Irwin
- Stephen James
- Theo James
- Cory Jane
- Ashton Jeanty
- Juan Jesus
- Mitchell Johnson
- Rusty Joiner
- Joe Jonas
- Nick Jonas
- Rafał Jonkisz
- Michael Jordan
- Michael B. Jordan
- Alan Jouban
- Patrick Kafka
- Daren Kagasoff
- Kaká
- Gillies Kaka
- Ted Karras
- Brian Kehoe
- Gus Kenworthy
- Fred Kerley
- Tawera Kerr-Barlow
- Harry Kewell
- Khalid
- Salman Khan
- RJ King
- Joel Kinnaman
- Cooper Koch
- Erwan Konaté
- Jon Kortajarena
- Arthur Kulkov
- Ashton Kutcher
- Nick Kyrgios
- Camille Lacourt
- Francisco Lachowski
- James Lafferty
- Jarvis Landry
- Todd Lasance
- Jack Laugher
- Karl Lawton
- Kayne Lawton
- George Lazenby
- Reichen Lehmkuhl
- Marios Lekkas
- William Levy
- Matthew Lewis
- Michael Lewis
- Lil Nas X
- Fernando Líndez
- Matthew Lister
- Freddie Ljungberg
- Marcos Llorente
- Ryan Lochte
- Howie Long
- Keiynan Lonsdale
- Mario Lopez
- Kevin Love
- Dejan Lovren
- Alexander Ludwig
- Matthew Ludwinski
- Florian Luger
- Romelu Lukaku
- Alex Lundqvist
- Kellan Lutz

=== M–R ===
- Machine Gun Kelly
- James Magnussen
- Grégory Mallet
- Maluma
- Florent Manaudou
- Federico Marchetti
- Claudio Marchisio
- Ed Marinaro
- Joe Marler
- Dustin Martin
- Javi Martínez
- Mariano Martínez
- Andrea Masi
- Rafał Maślak
- George Mason
- Cameron Mathison
- Daniel Matsunaga
- Nick Mayhugh
- Cameron McEvoy
- Gabriel Medina
- Jeremy Meeks
- Shawn Mendes
- Liam Messam
- Lionel Messi
- Scott McGregor
- Samuel Michener
- Tim Mikkelson
- Noah Mills
- Alex Minsky
- Donovan Mitchell
- Matthew Mitcham
- Evan Mock
- Ugo Monye
- Christian Monzon
- Shemar Moore
- Shawn Morales
- Miro Moreira
- Polo Morín
- Michele Morrone
- Mason Mount
- Sulley Muntari
- Lorenzo Musetti
- Maciej Musiał
- Rafael Nadal
- Hidetoshi Nakata
- Garrett Neff
- Simon Nessman
- Cam Newton
- Neymar
- Felix Neureuther
- Felix Nieder
- Franco Noriega
- Matthew Noszka
- Brett Novek
- Tanner Novlan
- Aitor Ocio
- Aaron O'Connell
- Dan Osborne
- Oscar
- Enrique Palacios
- Jim Palmer
- Peter Paltchik
- Sergio Parisse
- Cheyenne Parker
- Lance Parker
- Max Parker
- Alexandre Pato
- Mariano Pavone
- Liam Payne
- Joan Pedrola
- Andrea Pellegrino
- TJ Perenara
- Zane Phillips
- Arón Piper
- Andrea Pirlo
- Lukas Podolski
- Henry Pollock
- Jeremy Pope
- Antoni Porowski
- Post Malone
- Glen Powell
- Eddy Putter
- John Quinlan
- Eric Radford
- Pat Rafter
- KL Rahul
- Adil Rami
- Anthony Ramos
- Sergio Ramos
- Raphinha
- Marcus Rashford
- Rob Rausch
- Stuart Reardon
- Cauã Reymond
- Trevante Rhodes
- Richarlison
- Adam Rickitt
- Alan Ritchson
- Bobby Roache
- Tim Robards
- Ian Roberts
- Antonee Robinson
- Chris Robshaw
- Luke Rockhold
- James Rodríguez
- Nick Rodriguez
- Cristiano Ronaldo
- Massimiliano Rosolino
- Shaun Ross
- Rowoon

=== S–Z ===
- Antonio Sabàto Jr.
- Sebastián Saja
- Chris Salvatore
- Leroy Sané
- Sebastian Sauve
- Gleb Savchenko
- Jack Scalia
- Marcus Schenkenberg
- Nathan Schrimsher
- Danny Schwarz
- Patrick Schwarzenegger
- Adam Senn
- Simon Sherry-Wood
- Tsuyoshi Shinjo
- Matt Shirvington
- Johnny Sibilly
- Giovanni Simeone
- Cody Simpson
- Brian Sims
- Troye Sivan
- Tomas Skoloudik
- Mitchell Slaggert
- Miro Slavov
- Bailey Smith
- Justice Smith
- Nathan Sobey
- Tobias Sorensen
- Gabriel Soto
- Christian Sprenger
- Georges St-Pierre
- Dejan Stanković
- Freddie Stroma
- Oliver Stummvoll
- Eamon Sullivan
- Moses Sumney
- Lewis Tan
- Channing Tatum
- Pita Taufatofua
- Aaron Taylor-Johnson
- Gonçalo Teixeira
- Marlon Teixeira
- Paul Telfer
- Jeff Thomas
- Ian Thorpe
- Janko Tipsarević
- Ferran Torres
- Carlos Ulberg
- Colton Underwood
- Usher
- Charl van den Berg
- Mark Vanderloo
- Virgil Van Dijk
- Radoslav Vanko
- Andrea Vavassori
- Andrés Velencoso
- Johann Vera
- Fernando Verdasco
- Victor Vito
- Dwyane Wade
- Mark Wahlberg
- Tony Ward
- Garrett Wareing
- Joel West
- Jackson White
- Jeremy Allen White
- Sam Whitelock
- Christian Wilkins
- David Williams
- Robert Scott Wilson
- Tristan Wirfs
- David Witts
- Wonho
- Mark Wystrach
- Jwan Yosef
- Jack Youngblood
- Nick Youngquest
- Rick Yune
- Taylor Zakhar Perez
- Gianluca Zambrotta
- David Zepeda
- Lay Zhang
- Alexander Zickler
- Piotr Zieliński
- Chris Zylka
