= QCP =

QCP may refer to:

- QCP (internet personality) (Gianluca Conte, born 2000), American internet personality
- QCP (file format), used by mobile phones
- Quantum critical point, a concept in physics
