= Vanko =

Vanko is a surname. Notable people with this surname include:

- Miroslav Vanko (born 1973), Slovak long-distance runner
- Radoslav Vanko (born 1983), Slovak model

== Fictional characters ==
- Anton Vanko from Whiplash (Marvel Comics)

== See also ==
- Vankov
- Vánky
