= Avedon (disambiguation) =

Richard Avedon was an American fashion and portrait photographer.

Avedon may also refer to:

- Avedon (film), a 2026 documentary on the photographer
- Avedon (music producer), Dutch record producer
- Avedon (surname), a surname
- Avedon Carol (21st century), American feminist
