= Irreplaceable =

2006 single by Beyoncé

Single by Beyoncé

from the album B'Day
- Released: October 17, 2006
- Recorded: April 2006
- Studio: Sony (New York)
- Genre: Pop; country; R&B
- Length: 3:47
- Label: Columbia
- Composers: Beyoncé Knowles; Tor Erik Hermansen; Espen Lind; Amund Bjørklund; Mikkel S. Eriksen
- Lyricist: Shaffer "Ne-Yo" Smith
- Producers: Stargate; Beyoncé Knowles

Beyoncé singles chronology
"Ring the Alarm" (2006)	"Irreplaceable" (2006)	"Listen" (2006)

Music videos
- "Irreplaceable" on YouTube; "Irreemplazable" on YouTube

"Irreplaceable" is a song recorded by American singer Beyoncé for her second studio album B'Day (2006). It was written by Shaffer "Ne-Yo" Smith, Tor Erik Hermansen, Mikkel S. Eriksen, Espen Lind, Amund Bjørklund, and Beyoncé, and was produced by Stargate and Beyoncé. Originally a country record, the song was rearranged as a mid-tempo ballad with pop and "country-R&B" influences by modifying the vocal arrangements and instrumentation. During the production and recording sessions, Beyoncé and Ne-Yo wanted to create a record which people of either gender could relate to. The song's lyrics are about the breakdown of a relationship with an unfaithful man and the song contains a message about female empowerment.

Following the moderate chart performances of "Déjà Vu" and "Ring the Alarm", "Irreplaceable" was released as the second international and third US single from B'Day on October 17, 2006, by Columbia Records. It became Beyoncé's fourth number-one on the US Billboard Hot 100, remaining atop the chart for 10 consecutive weeks and emerging as the best-performing song on the chart of 2007. Internationally, it peaked at number one in Australia, Hungary, Ireland, and New Zealand. In 2024, the song was certified octuple platinum by the Recording Industry Association of America (RIAA), for digital sales of eight million units in the US.

The single's accompanying music video was directed by Anthony Mandler and served as the debut performance of Beyoncé's all-female band, Suga Mama. The video was included on the 2007 B'Day Anthology Video Album, and a video edit was produced for "Irreemplazable", the Spanish version of the song that was featured on the 2007 extended play of the same name. It won the Video of the Year award at the 2007 Black Entertainment Television (BET) Awards, and was nominated for the MTV Video Music Award for Video of the Year at the 2007 Awards. "Irreplaceable" has regularly featured in Beyoncé's tours and live performances since 2006.

The American Society of Composers, Authors and Publishers (ASCAP) recognized the song as one of the most performed of 2007 at the ASCAP Pop Music Awards. Pitchfork and Rolling Stone placed it on their lists of best songs of the 2000s. "Irreplaceable" won several awards, including Best R&B/Soul Single – Female at the 2007 Soul Train Music Awards. It was nominated for the Record of the Year at the 50th Annual Grammy Awards (2008).

== Production ==
What happens sometimes, is you think about a specific artist and you put them in this box, the song has to be this way or that, and then you're usually confining yourself to the thing they did three years ago. But [Beyoncé] heard it and did her own vocal arrangements, asked for a few changes to be made and some new drums, and she sang it much higher than the demo. It became the biggest urban record ... ever.

— Producer and songwriter Tor Erik Hermansen on how the song became Beyoncé's hit

"Irreplaceable" was written for Chrisette Michele. Production team Stargate and singer-songwriter Ne-Yo had written for Beyoncé's second album B'Day, but Tor Erik Hermansen of Stargate said that they might not have gone in the direction they did on the song. The tune did not suit Beyoncé's voice, and Ne-Yo wrote the lyrics from a male perspective, although it was not based upon his personal experiences. Ne-Yo wrote the song in the country style, thinking of country singers Shania Twain and Faith Hill during the sessions. When Ne-Yo heard them playing the song with a guitar, he thought it sounded like country music. But when the drums were incorporated into the music, it was brought to an R&B vibe, and Ne-Yo considered making an R&B-country western music song instead.

When the team worked with Ne-Yo, they recorded the song with a male vocalist. However, they thought a female vocalist would be more suitable, and Ne-Yo also thought that it was empowering for a woman to sing it. Eriksen of Stargate said it was an A&R person who suggested that the song would work better when sung by a woman. Two labels wanted the song. While Beyoncé worked on material for B'Day, she was pleased with the demo of the "Irreplaceable" that was presented to her. However, "Irreplaceable" did not seem to fit on B'Day, which was supposed to be "a hard-hitting club album". Swizz Beatz, who was working on the album, declared that Beyoncé would be crazy not to include the song on the record. Beyoncé asked for changes to the song, including the addition of drums, vocal arrangements, and singing in a higher register than the demo. Espen Lind and Amund Bjørklund, from the Norwegian production team Espionage, wrote the chord structure and the guitar part. In an interview with MTV, Ne-Yo said, "Beyoncé had some stuff that she wanted to get off her chest", while aiming to make a record that women could relate to, in keeping with the theme of the album.

The recording was engineered by Jim Caruana and mixed by Jason Goldstein at Sony Music Studios in New York City. Goldstein was hired to mix B'Day. He said: "This song was really simple to mix. It was produced by Stargate and the sounds are really good and they all made sense, and there was lots of room for all the instruments." Goldstein used a board equalizer for the drums' treatment. For the acoustic guitars, he used the analogue flanger of a TC 1210 spatial expander "to sweeten the sound" and to give them "a little bit more spread". Goldstein thought "Irreplaceable" sounded "a bit old-school"; an eighth note delay echo was placed on the song's lead vocal at 341ms, using the Echo Farm plug-in software. For the backing vocals, Goldstein used Echo Farm with a quarter note delay at 682ms and Sony's Oxford Dynamics compressor/limiter in dual-mono mode.

The compressor was placed in Classic setting, to emulate the LA-2A leveling amplifier, and the Warmth button used to add harmonics. Oxford Dynamics was used for the bass in a different setting. Goldstein passed the final mix through the Oxford EQ and Inflator plug-ins. Pro Tools software was used to print the aux track into a 44.1kHz/24-bit CD and then into a 24-bit CD master. After the sessions for "Irreplaceable" ended, Hermansen said that "everyone felt they had captured something special and that Beyoncé had done the track justice", but there were still concerns that urban radio might not play the song as it featured acoustic guitars and had more of a pop appeal. "But then it became the biggest urban record ... ever," [Hermansen] said.

=== Songwriting controversy ===
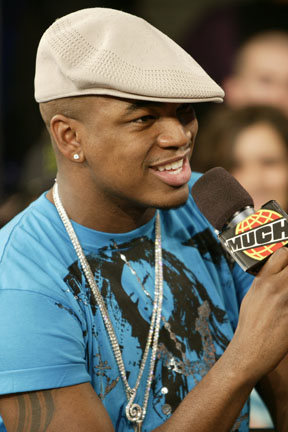
R&B singer Ne-Yo wrote all the lyrics to the song.

A controversy arose over the writing credits on "Irreplaceable". Ne-Yo told MTV: "Apparently Beyoncé was at a show somewhere and right before the song came on she said, 'I wrote this for all my ladies' and then the song came on ... The song is a co-write. I wrote the lyrics, I wrote all the lyrics. Beyoncé helped me with the melodies and the harmonies and the vocal arrangement and that makes it a co-write. Meaning my contribution and her contribution made that song what it is." In 2011, Ne-Yo said that he wrote the song for himself, but thought that it would be better suited for Beyoncé. Some of Beyoncé's fans read Ne-Yo's remark as disrespectful towards her. However, he clarified his comment later through Twitter, writing, "I said I originally wrote the song for me. ... Once I realized how the song comes across if sung by a guy, that's when I decided to give it away."

== Composition ==
"Irreplaceable" is a pop and country-R&B ballad. It is in the key of B♭ major, with a beat in common time, and a tempo of a moderate 88 beats per minute. Beyoncé's vocal range in the song spans nearly two and a half octaves, from B♭_{2} to E♭_{5}. While most of the songs on the album are aggressive and uptempo, her voice on "Irreplaceable" is toned down. "Irreplaceable" uses a gently strummed acoustic guitar, following the B♭_{5}–F_{5}–Cm_{7}–E♭_{6/9} chord series. Hermansen and Eriksen combined the classic chord progression on an acoustic guitar, a modern-sounding 808 drum beat and cellos. Al Shipley of Stylus Magazine noted that the guitar strum can be found in Rihanna's 2007 single "Hate That I Love You", a song co-produced by Stargate and Ne-Yo. Rob Sheffield of Rolling Stone wrote that Chris Brown's 2007 single "With You", another Stargate-produced song, also features the same element. He wrote, "'With You' is the convincer, even if you can instantly tell that producer Stargate was just trying to roll out 'Irreplaceable' one more time." while Billboard magazine wrote that it "leans a bit too heavily" to the song.

"Irreplaceable"
A 22-second sample of "Irreplaceable" featuring Beyoncé singing the hook lines. The mid-tempo ballad uses instrumentation from 808, acoustic guitar and cello, resulting in a combination of pop, country and R&B genres.

Jim DeRogatis of the Chicago Sun-Times wrote that "Irreplaceable" resembles ballads sung by Whitney Houston. Spence D. of IGN wrote that the song was inspired by Aretha Franklin's work since "Irreplaceable" consists of several variations in gutturals and octave range. The lyrics of "Irreplaceable" concern the breakdown of a woman's relationship with her boyfriend after she discovers his infidelity, and the song "sounds a lot like a statement of independence". Sarah Rodman of The Boston Globe wrote, "With a heretofore unknown grasp of nuance, Beyonce combines heartache, bravado, and anger as she tells a cad he's far from irreplaceable—and that, in fact, her new man will be arriving momentarily." Hermansen said that "Irreplaceable" is a song that "people from all walks of life can enjoy". Beyoncé said that the song is "a little honest", and, "... basically we can't forget our power and our worth. And sometimes you're so in love, you forget that. And sometimes you feel like you're not being appreciated. And sometimes they forget that they can be replaced."

The song's lyrics are constructed in the verse-pre-chorus-chorus form. It begins with guitar strumming, and Beyoncé sings the hook-intro, "To the left, to the left: everything you own in a box to the left". In bar seven, she sings the first verse, arguing with her boyfriend about the indifference of their relationship, and tells him to walk away. The pre-chorus and chorus follow, "You must not know 'bout me ... I can have another you by tomorrow / I could have another you in a minute ... Don't you ever for a second get to thinking / You're irreplaceable". In the second verse, Beyoncé recollects the moment she discovered her boyfriend's infidelity. The same pattern leads to the second chorus. Towards the end, Beyoncé sings the bridge, where she tells her lover, "Replacing you is so easy". The song closes with an ad-libbed chorus. The Boston Globe noted that Beyoncé sings some parts of it in a higher register "that complements the lyrics' wounded sensibility".

== Release ==
During the production of "Irreplaceable", Hermansen thought that the track would not receive radio play because of the acoustic guitars, and deemed the song too pop-oriented. Hermansen did not expect "Irreplaceable" to conform to any genre. Despite his prediction, the song became successful on urban charts. It was played in New York and on country radio stations. Shortly after the release of "Irreplaceable", Beyoncé told MTV: "I love 'Irreplaceable'. I think it's important to have those songs. I've had so many people come up to me in tears, saying, 'I experienced my first breakup. If it wasn't for the song, I wouldn't be strong enough to not call. I wouldn't know how much I'm worth.' I'm happy to be a part of that."

"Irreplaceable" was released in the United Kingdom on October 23, 2006, as the second single there. In the US, "Irreplaceable" was the third single from B'Day', and followed "Ring the Alarm". The single was released on December 5, 2006, and featured the album and instrumental versions of the track. "Irreplaceable" was the second single released from B'Day in international markets on Columbia Records. Two versions of the single were released in the UK on October 26, 2006. A CD single, which featured the album version of "Irreplaceable", and the Freemasons club mix radio edit of "Ring the Alarm", was released. An enhanced CD, which included the album version, three remixes of "Ring the Alarm", and the "Ring the Alarm" music video, was also released. A 12-inch single was released in the UK the following week. In Australia, a maxi single, which featured the album version and two remixes of "Déjà Vu", was released on December 5, 2006. A Maurice Joshua remix edit of the song was released in Australia two weeks later.

Beyoncé recorded a Spanish version of the song, called "Irreemplazable", with additional lyrical contributions from Rudy Pérez and was included on the second disc of the deluxe edition of B'Day released on June 12, 2007. An Irreemplazable EP was released in the US on August 28, 2007, and on September 10, 2007, in the UK. The EP includes "Irreemplazable", the Norteña Remix of "Irreplaceable", "Amor Gitano", three versions of "Beautiful Liar", the Timbaland remix of "Get Me Bodied" featuring Julio Voltio, and "Oye", the Spanish version of "Listen".

As a fundraiser for the victims of the 2011 Tōhoku earthquake and tsunami in Japan, a compilation album that included "Irreplaceable", called Songs for Japan, was released on March 25, 2011.

On September 3, 2026, Beyoncé released "Irreemplazable (Como la Flor)", a mashup of the Spanish version of the song with "Como la Flor" by Tejano artist Selena. The song was released as part of the 20th anniversary edition of B'Day. In a press release from her team, Beyoncé credited Selena with inspiration for her 2007 Spanish EP Irreemplazable after hearing her frequently on Houston radio (as well as a storied meeting at Houston Galleria) in her adolescence.

== Critical reception ==
"Irreplaceable" received rave reviews. Jody Rosen of Entertainment Weekly noted "Irreplaceable" to be "a lilting tune unlike anything Beyoncé has ever performed". Sarah Rodman of The Boston Globe wrote that the song is "gentle but maddeningly hook-y". Spence Abbott of IGN wrote that "Irreplaceable" and "Resentment" go for "a much more traditional contemporary R&B vibe" than any of the previous tracks on B'Day, making them stand out as if they were recorded separately from the rest of the album.

Roger Friedman of Fox News wrote that "Irreplaceable" is a "clever ballad" and the most memorable track on B'Day. He added that it has the most potential of catching on with fans quickly, and that it is the only song on the album that "you might actually want to sing along to". Mike Joseph of PopMatters commented that "'Irreplaceable' tellingly, was co-written by Ne-Yo, who may not be the powerhouse vocalist Beyonce is, but has significantly stronger songwriting skills. It's the best song on the album—perhaps Ms. Knowles should take a hint." Tim Finney of Pitchfork Media, called "Irreplaceable" the best song on B'Day and praised its overall production, writing:

Before, Beyoncé's approach to heartbreak was always literal, her voice and her words declaiming her feelings with a studied earnestness that at times was difficult to believe, let alone connect with. 'Irreplaceable' is the first song in which Beyoncé lies to herself, and the way her voice perfectly betrays that lie (revealing a giveaway tremble in the stiff upper lip of the lyrics) simultaneously renders it her most sophisticated and her most honest performance to date.

=== Recognition and accolades ===
Mark Edward Nero ranked it as the ninth best R&B song of 2006, and wrote, "This song has modern-day classic written all over it." The Village Voice listed it 18 on their list of best songs of 2006. Staff members of Pitchfork Media ranked the song on their list of The Top 100 Tracks of 2006 at number 45. Shaheem Reid, Jayson Rodriguez and Rahman Dukes of MTV News placed the song at number 3 on their year-end list of 27 Essential R&B Songs of 2007.

In 2009, Ryan Schreiber ranked "Irreplaceable" at number 183 on his list of Top 500 Tracks of the 2000s (decade). Barry Schwartz of Stylus Magazine wrote that "Irreplaceable" recaptured Beyoncé's 2003 debut single "Crazy in Love"'s near-perfection, describing it as "gentle but defiant", and further wrote, "Through some breezy strums and a sweet plaintive melody Beyonce delivers her most genuinely emotional vocal to date, equal parts vulnerable, upset, pissed off, vindictive, resigned, and apathetic." Rolling Stone ranked the song at number 60 on its list of 100 Best Songs of the 2000s. The RIAA recognized the song as the "Highest-certified Master Ringtone by a Female Artist" of the decade achieving three times multiplatinum certification

"Irreplaceable" won the award for Best R&B/Soul Single, Female, at the 2007 Soul Train Music Award, and the 'Favorite Song' award at the 2007 Nickelodeon Kids' Choice Awards. It was nominated for the Grammy Award for Record of the Year in the 2008 Grammy Awards, and Song of the Year at the VH1 Soul Vibe awards. "Irreplaceable" was recognized as one of the five most-performed songs of 2007 by the ASCAP Pop Music Awards.

== Commercial performance ==
"Irreplaceable" entered various charts worldwide, and became the most successful single released from B'Day. The single debuted on the US Billboard Hot 100 chart on November 4, 2006, at number eighty-seven. It climbed the charts rapidly because of its radio airplay, and it was the "Greatest Airplay Gainer" for six consecutive weeks by early December 2006. Three weeks after the release of "Irreplaceable", B'Day re-entered the top ten on the US Billboard 200. "Irreplaceable" reached number one on December 16, becoming Beyoncé's fourth number one single as a solo artist, and her second in 2006, following "Check on It" (2005). The single spent 10 consecutive weeks at number one and was replaced by Nelly Furtado's "Say It Right" (2006) on February 24, 2007. "Irreplaceable" outperformed "Baby Boy"'s nine weeks at number one. Beyoncé's former group Destiny's Child's single "Independent Women Part I" (2000) remained at number one for eleven weeks in late 2000 and early 2001. "Irreplaceable" remained on the chart for thirty weeks, and as of December 2017, and was certified double platinum by the Recording Industry Association of America (RIAA). It was additionally certified triple platinum in July 2007, denoting sales of three million master ringtones. "Irreplaceable" peaked atop the US Radio Songs, staying atop the chart for eleven consecutive weeks.

According to Mediabase, "Irreplaceable" passed the two hundred million audience impressions mark on December 11, 2006. Another Beyoncé's single "Check on It" previously passed this mark on January 31, 2006. Consequently, Beyoncé became the second singer to achieve this in the United States, the first having been Mariah Carey whose two singles, "We Belong Together" (2005) and "Shake It Off" (2005), passed the same audience impressions mark in 2005. "Irreplaceable" was the best-performing single in the United States of 2007, topping the Billboard Top Hot 100 Hits. "Irreplaceable" installed Beyoncé at third place for most number one singles by a female songwriter, overtaking Janet Jackson and Carole King and tying Diane Warren for nine number-one singles. Beyoncé received three songwriting credits in one year, the only woman to achieve this since King in 1971 and Carey in 1991. In February 2010, the Recording Industry Association of America (RIAA) listed "Irreplaceable" as the highest certified master ringtone by a female solo artist of the 2000s. By August 2011, the single had sold over three million digital downloads in the United States. Spanish version of the song "Irreemplazable" charted equally well, peaking at number four on the Hot Latin Songs. The extended play (EP) of the same title appeared on the US Latin Pop Albums at number two, Top Latin Albums at number three, Top R&B/Hip-Hop Albums at number forty-one and on the Billboard 200 at number one-hundred-and-five.

"Irreplaceable" debuted at number eight on the Australian ARIA Singles Chart, and peaked at number one, staying atop the chart for three consecutive weeks, becoming Beyoncé's first and so far only number-one single in Australia. It was certified seven-times platinum by the Australian Recording Industry Association (ARIA), denoting shipments of 490,000 copies. "Irreplaceable" appeared twice on the ARIA year-end charts, reaching number twenty-three in 2006, and number forty-two in 2007. "Irreplaceable" debuted at number three on the New Zealand Singles Chart on November 6, 2006, the song's highest debut on any chart. It peaked at number one, and remained on the chart for eighteen weeks. It was later certified triple platinum by the Recording Industry Association of New Zealand (RIANZ). "Irreplaceable" peaked atop the charts in Hungary and Ireland, as well; it also entered the top ten in Canada, Croatia, Czech Republic, Denmark, France, Greece, Italy, the Netherlands, Norway, Poland, Romania, Scotland, Slovakia, Switzerland, the United Kingdom and Venezuela. In the United Kingdom, it peaked at number four on the UK Singles Chart, spending twelve weeks in the top twenty and twenty-five weeks on the chart in total. It was Beyoncé's fifth longest-charting single in the United Kingdom, and spent more weeks on the chart than her number-one singles "Crazy in Love" and "Déjà Vu" but slightly less than more recent hit singles "If I Were a Boy", "Single Ladies (Put a Ring on It)", "Halo" and "Sweet Dreams". Due to Beyoncé's performance of "Irreplaceable" at the Glastonbury Festival 2011 on June 26, 2011, the song re-entered the top forty of the UK Singles Chart at number thirty-three, and the live version appeared at number twenty-six on the UK Singles Chart Update.

== Music video ==
In the music video, Beyoncé argues with then-former lover portrayed by Bobby Roache.

"Irreplaceable" was directed by Anthony Mandler, who co-directed the video of "Get Me Bodied". The video features the debut performance of Beyoncé's all-female band, Suga Mama, who also appeared in the "Green Light" music video. Her acting-then-ex-boyfriend in the video is model Bobby Roache, who played police officer for the "Ring the Alarm" music video and warrior during Jay-Z and Beyoncé's live performance at the 2006 Fashion Rocks show. The video was included on the 2007 B'Day Anthology Video Album, and a video edit was produced for "Irreemplazable". Part of the video which shows Beyoncé dancing in silhouette in front of a glass door is inspired by a James Bond movie. Late in January 2008, "Irreemplazable" premiered on the MiTRL, a video countdown show on the bilingual channel MTV Tr3s.

The music video follows the storyline of the song's lyrics. "She told me to pack up all my stuff, I'm getting kicked out—the video starts off like that", said Roache. It opens with Beyoncé filing her nails in silence, as her ex-partner packs up his property, as Beyoncé orders him to leave. Mid-way in the video, Beyoncé follows her then-ex-boyfriend outside the house and leans on a 2007 Jaguar XK. She appears to be pretentiously caressing him; only for the audience to find out that she is repossessing things she bought for him. He leaves her and the car, about to ride off in a taxi. Between cuts, Beyoncé manages herself in front of a mirror; putting on a lipstick, wearing huge curlers and a high-waisted skirt. There are additional beats mixed to the arrangement for the video version that can be heard, when Beyoncé sings with her all-female band, Suga Mama, towards the end. It ends with Beyoncé greeting her new boyfriend at the front door.

At the 2007 Black Entertainment Television (BET) Awards, Beyoncé won Video of the Year Award for "Irreplaceable", an award for which "Beautiful Liar" was also nominated. It was nominated for Video of the Year during the 2007 MTV Video Music Awards, but it lost to Rihanna's single, "Umbrella" (2007). At the 2007 Soul Train Music Awards, the video was nominated for the Michael Jackson Award for Best R&B/Soul or Rap Music Video, but lost to rapper (and husband) Jay-Z's "Show Me What You Got" video. The video received two nominations for Best Female Artist and Video of the Year at the 2007 MTV Australia Video Music Awards.

== Live performances ==
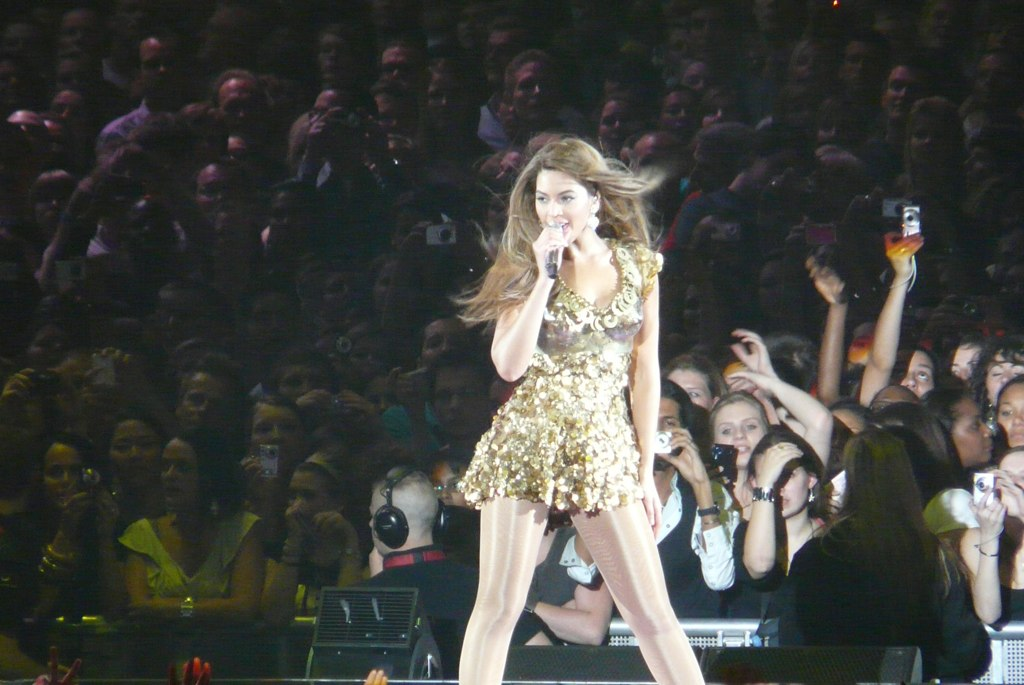
Beyoncé performing "Irreplaceable" during the I Am... World Tour, 2009

Beyoncé performed "Irreplaceable" during various public appearances, including the 2006 American Music Awards, The Ellen DeGeneres Show, the Today Show.

The song was a part of Beyoncé's set list for her tour The Beyoncé Experience and I Am... World Tour. "Irreplaceable" was the closing song during her 2007 The Beyoncé Experience world tour. It was performed late in the set on earlier tour dates, but when Beyoncé embarked on the US leg, it was performed earlier in the show. Beyoncé performed "Irreplaceable" during her Revel Presents: Beyoncé Live revue.

Beyoncé has performed "Irreplaceable" without backup dancers or live instrumentation, or in another case, Beyoncé was accompanied by two drummers, two keyboardists, a percussionist, a horn section, three backup vocalists called the Mamas, and the lead guitarist, Bibi McGill. Footage of Beyoncé's performance at the Staples Center, Los Angeles was included on The Beyoncé Experience Live! DVD (2007), and the deluxe edition of I Am... World Tour (2010). At her historic headlining Glastonbury Festival Performance on June 26, 2011, "'Irreplaceable' sparked a mass singalong, with the crowd taking the lead on the entire first verse." Following the performance, the live version of the song was digitally released in the UK and the US on June 27, 2011, as charity single to raise funds for Oxfam, WaterAid and Greenpeace. This version charted at number twenty-six on the UK Singles Chart Update.

A shortened version of "Irreplaceable" was added to the setlist of the Cowboy Carter Tour on the May 1, 2025, date in Los Angeles, marking the first time Beyoncé had performed the song since the 2013-2014 The Mrs. Carter Show World Tour a decade earlier.

== Cover versions and usage in media ==
American band Sleigh Bells recorded an acoustic cover of the song during their Maida Vale sessions and released it Zane Lowe's BBC Radio 1 show on March 6, 2012. A writer of Billboard magazine commented that their cover was "ethereal". Ray Rahman of Entertainment Weekly described the cover as "really good!... Krauss also has a teen-pop background thanks to her Rubyblue days, so it's actually not that surprising that she can find her away around a Top 40 single so well." However, Maura Johnston of The Village Voice gave a negative review for the cover, saying: "Krauss sighs her way through the song, turning her voice into a mew that sounds like she was trying to sing along with the radio while not being heard by her roommates or anyone else outside of a six-inch radius... Also, some of the guitar chords are a bit off.... it's sorta disappointing."

In 2007, Gregory and the Hawk and Taylor Swift each covered the song. US country band Sugarland, who performed some of Beyoncé's songs during their live shows, performed a country version of "Irreplaceable" with Beyoncé at the 2007 American Music Awards, held on November 18. Kate Nash covered "Irreplaceable" in January 2008. In November 2009, Damon Thomas of The Underdogs sang the song. Kidz Bop covered "Irreplaceable" on their eleventh studio album Kidz Bop 11 (2007). A group named Faith, consisting of Michelle Delamor, Ashley Rodriguez and Charity Vance, sang "Irreplaceable" on the 'group night' episode of ninth season of American Idol on February 10, 2010, In 2011, Canadian singer Maria Aragon, and South Korean singer G.NA, covered the song. Andy Grammer performed "Irreplaceable" on the radio station The Mix Lounge 104.1 and posted the video of his performance on his YouTube page in June 2011. During the finale of the tenth season of American Idol on May 25, 2011, the lady contestants joined together onstage to perform "Irreplaceable" along with a medley of Beyoncé's other singles. On August 26, 2013, singer Barry Southgate covered the song during the fifth season of The X Factor Australia. Giles Hardie of The Sydney Morning Herald rated his performance eight out of ten and wrote it was "a very clever song choice". In September 2013, Lily Allen covered "Irreplaceable" at a celebration party in Italy, and on June 30, 2014, Anja Nissen covered the song on the third series of The Voice Australia. In May 2007, "Irreplaceable" was used in the final scene of "When the Chickens Come Home to Roost", the final episode of the first season of the television series The Game. The series also used the song in the opening moments of its premiere episode for the second season. In 2017, Woman2Woman group from Cape Town, South Africa, did a parody on the breakfast show Expresso. Felicity Kiran, Anray Amansure and Lauren-Lee Bock originally did it as promotional video. It went viral with around 40 million views worldwide.

== Track listings and formats ==
- US Remixes – EP
1. "Irreplaceable" (Ralphi Rosario & Craig J Radio Mix) – 4:08
2. "Irreplaceable" (Ralphi Rosario & Craig J Club Mix) – 8:51
3. "Irreplaceable" (Ralphi Rosario Dub) – 9:27
4. "Irreplaceable" (Maurice Joshua Radio Mix) – 4:05
5. "Irreplaceable" (Maurice Joshua Club Mix) – 7:06
6. "Irreplaceable" (Featuring Ghostface Killah) – 4:45
7. "Irreplaceable" (DJ Speedy Remix) – 4:20
- Australian EP
1. "Irreplaceable" (Album Version) – 3:47
2. "Déjà Vu" (Freemasons Club Mix) – 8:05
3. "Déjà Vu" (The Remix) – 3:54
- German Basic single
1. "Irreplaceable" (Album Version) – 3:47
2. "Ring the Alarm" (Freemasons Club Mix Radio Edit) – 3:27
- German Premium CD-single
1. "Irreplaceable" (Album Version) – 3:48
2. "Ring the Alarm" (Freemasons Club Mix Radio Edit) – 3:26
3. "Ring the Alarm" (Karmatronic Remix) – 3:10
4. "Ring the Alarm" (Tranzformas Remix featuring Collie Buddz) – 4:12
5. "Ring the Alarm" (Enhanced Music Video)

== Credits and personnel ==
Credits are taken from B'Day liner notes.

- Vocals by Beyoncé
- Lyrics by Ne-Yo
- Music by Mikkel S. Eriksen, Tor Erik Hermansen, Espen Lind, Amund Bjorklund and Beyoncé
- Produced by Stargate and Beyoncé
- Co-Produced by Ne-Yo
- A&R: Max Gousse (Music World Productions Inc.)
- Recording by Jim Caruana
  - Assistant: Rob Kinelski
- Mixing by Jason Goldstein
- Guitars: Espen Lind
- All other instruments: Eriksen and Hermansen

== Charts ==
=== Weekly charts ===
2006–2007 weekly chart performance for "Irreplaceable"
Chart (2006–2007)	Peak position
Australia (ARIA)	1
Australian Urban (ARIA)	2
Austria (Ö3 Austria Top 40)	11
Belgium (Ultratop 50 Flanders)	13
Belgium (Ultratop 50 Wallonia)	25
Brazil (Associated Press)	4
Canada (Nielsen SoundScan)	3
Canada (Canadian Hot 100)	20 (Note: "Irreplaceable" debuted and peaked at number 20 on the first issue of the Canadian Hot 100, dated March 31, 2007.)
Canada AC (Billboard)	22
Canada CHR/Top 40 (Billboard)	1
Canada Hot AC (Billboard)	4
Croatia (HRT)	7
Czech Republic (Rádio Top 100)	4
Denmark (Tracklisten)	9
European Hot 100 Singles (Billboard)	7
France (SNEP)	10
Germany (GfK)	11
Global Dance Songs (Billboard)	26
Greece (IFPI)	17
Hungary (Rádiós Top 40)	1
Ireland (IRMA)	1
Italy (FIMI)	10
Netherlands (Dutch Top 40)	3
Netherlands (Single Top 100)	5
New Zealand (Recorded Music NZ)	1
Norway (VG-lista)	8
Poland (Polish Airplay Charts)	2
Romania (Romanian Top 100)	4
Russia Airplay (TopHit)	11
Scottish Singles Sales (Official Charts)	5
Slovakia Airplay (ČNS IFPI)	3
Sweden (Sverigetopplistan)	19
Switzerland (Schweizer Hitparade)	9
UK Singles (Official Charts)	4
UK Hip Hop/R&B (Official Charts)	1
US Billboard Hot 100	1
US Adult Contemporary (Billboard)	10
US Adult Pop Airplay (Billboard)	15
US Dance Club Songs (Billboard)	1
US Hot Latin Songs (Billboard)	10
US Hot R&B/Hip-Hop Songs (Billboard)	1
US Latin Pop Airplay (Billboard)	33
US Pop Airplay (Billboard)	1
US Pop 100 (Billboard)	1
US Rhythmic Airplay (Billboard)	1
Venezuela Pop/Rock (Record Report)	4

2007 weekly chart performance for "Irreemplazable"
Chart (2007)	Peak position
Finland (Suomen virallinen lista)	13
Germany (GfK)	78
Italy (FIMI)	3
US Hot Latin Songs (Billboard)	4
US Latin Pop Airplay (Billboard)	21
US Tropical Airplay (Billboard)	23

=== Year-end charts ===
2006 year-end chart performance for "Irreplaceable"
Chart (2006)	Position
Australia (ARIA)	23
Australian Urban (ARIA)	16
European Hot 100 Singles (Billboard)	100
Ireland (IRMA)	17
Netherlands (Dutch Top 40)	41
Netherlands (Single Top 100)	71
Sweden (Hitlistan)	88
Switzerland (Schweizer Hitparade)	96
UK Singles (OCC)	29

2007 year-end chart performance for "Irreplaceable"
Chart (2007)	Position
Australia (ARIA)	42
Australian Urban (ARIA)	19
Brazil (Crowley)	8
European Hot 100 Singles (Billboard)	42
France Airplay (SNEP)	67
Germany (GfK)	79
Hungary (Rádiós Top 40)	44
Netherlands (Single Top 100)	99
Romania (Romanian Top 100)	27
Russia Airplay (TopHit)	107
UK Singles (OCC)	120
US Billboard Hot 100	1
US Adult Contemporary (Billboard)	24
US Dance Club Play (Billboard)	43
US Hot Latin Songs (Billboard)	49
US Hot R&B/Hip Hop Songs (Billboard)	7
US Pop 100 (Billboard)	3
US Rhythmic Top 40 (Billboard)	8

Chart (2012)	Position
South Korea International (Gaon)	173

=== Decade-end charts ===
2000s decade-end chart performance for "Irreplaceable"
Chart (2000–2009)	Position
US Billboard Hot 100	25
US Hot R&B/Hip Hop Songs (Billboard)	45
US Mainstream Top 40 (Billboard)	40

=== All-time charts ===
All-time chart performance for "Irreplaceable"
Chart	Position
US Billboard Hot 100	160

== Certifications ==
Certifications and sales for "Irreplaceable"
Region	Certification	Certified units/sales
Australia (ARIA)	7× Platinum	490,000^{‡}
Brazil (Pro-Música Brasil)	3× Platinum	180,000^{‡}
Canada (Music Canada)	3× Platinum	240,000^{‡}
Denmark (IFPI Danmark)	Platinum	90,000^{‡}
Germany (BVMI)	Gold	150,000^{‡}
New Zealand (RMNZ)	4× Platinum	120,000^{‡}
United Kingdom (BPI)	3× Platinum	1,800,000^{‡}
United States (RIAA)	8× Platinum	8,000,000^{‡}
Ringtone
Canada (Music Canada) Mastertone	Platinum	40,000^{*}
United States (RIAA) Mastertone	3× Platinum	3,000,000^{*}
^{*} Sales figures based on certification alone.^{‡} Sales+streaming figures based on certification alone.

== Release history ==
Release dates and formats for "Irreplaceable"
Region	Date	Format(s)	Label(s)	Ref.
United States	October 17, 2006	Digital download	Columbia	
United Kingdom	October 23, 2006	CD; maxi CD	RCA	
Australia	October 27, 2006	Digital download (EP)	Sony BMG	
United Kingdom	October 30, 2006	12-inch vinyl	RCA	
Australia	November 4, 2006	Maxi CD	Sony BMG	
Germany	November 17, 2006	CD; digital download; maxi CD	Sony BMG	
United States	December 5, 2006	CD	Columbia; Sony Urban	
France	January 8, 2007	CD; maxi CD	Columbia	
United States	February 13, 2007	Digital download (EP)	Columbia	
Japan	March 7, 2007	CD+DVD (Note: In Japan, "Irreplaceable" was released as a double A-side audiovisual single with "Listen".)	Sony Music Japan	

== See also ==
- List of number-one singles in Australia in 2006
- List of number-one singles of 2006 (Ireland)
- List of number-one singles from the 2000s (New Zealand)
- List of Billboard Hot 100 number-one singles of 2006
- List of Billboard Hot 100 number-one singles of 2007
- List of number-one R&B singles of 2006 (U.S.)
- List of number-one R&B singles of 2007 (U.S.)
- List of number-one dance singles of 2007 (U.S.)
