= Brett Novek =

American male fashion model and actor (born 1984)

- Born: April 26, 1984 (age 41); Fort Lauderdale, Florida, U.S.
- Modeling information
- Height: 6 ft 0 in (183 cm)
- Hair color: Brown
- Eye color: Brown
- Agency: Irene Marie Models - L.A. Models - Joy Models Management
- Website: www.facebook.com#!/novek1

Brett Michael Novek (born April 26, 1984) is an American male fashion model and actor. He is a campaign-level model for Papi Underwear and appears on their product packaging and sales and promotional material. In 2007, he was a contestant in season one of VH1's reality competition television program America's Most Smartest Model, in which he placed fourth.

== Biography ==
=== Early life ===
Novek was born in Fort Lauderdale, Florida the second son of Robin and David Novek. He was born and raised in a Jewish family. Novek has an older brother, Craig, who he considers to be his best friend.

Novek graduated from the University of Central Florida in 2006, majoring in Marketing.

== Career ==
While working out at a gym, Novek met professional model Gregg Avedon, who submitted Novek's information to a modeling agency. An initial photo shoot was done with photographer Scott Teitler and this led to him signing with Irene Marie Models and modeling for clients such as Papi Underwear, which used Novek for an advertising campaign and live modeling events.

In 2007 Novek moved from Florida to Los Angeles, California to pursue other modeling opportunities and video, television, and film work. Novek has signed with L.A. Models, and Joy Models Management in Milan, Italy.

After his father died from non-Hodgkin lymphoma in 2008, Brett started the clothing company Good HYouman in an attempt to save others from the heartache he felt, of which a portion of its profits goes to help people with leukemia and lymphoma.

=== America's Most Smartest Model ===
In May 2007, Novek participated as one of sixteen professional model contestants in the taping of season one of America's Most Smartest Model. The game show consisted of a series of challenges that led to each model being eliminated from the contest until only the winner remained. Novek symbolically tied with the eventual winner VJ Logan for the most number of challenges won, but ended the game in fourth place.

When the show aired later in the year, Novek appeared in episodes 1 to 9. At the end of the ninth episode, Novek was eliminated. According to the judges, it was because of a disappointing performance in an automobile presentation challenge and because it appeared that he had lost his motivation after his friend and fellow contestant, Jeff Pickel, was eliminated the episode before.

== Commercial Work ==
Novek has appeared in an Ashlee Simpson video ("Outta My Head"), an advertising campaign for LA Fitness, and in a 10 Minute Trainer fitness video (Tony Horton's 10 Minute Trainer).

Modeling clients include Hollister Co., Armani Exchange, Emporio Armani, Parke and Ronen, Cosmo Girl, and Target Corporation. His online clothing catalog credits include RevolveClothing.com and SportScheck.com.

In 2008, Novek appeared in a national television commercial for Taco Bell and another for Optimum Online.

== Filmography ==
=== Film ===
Year	Film	Role	Notes
2010	The Penthouse	Joey	
2009	Tango Late	Boxer	
2009	Hard Breakers	Skater Boy	
2009	The Brotherhood V: Alumni	Randall	
2008	H.U.M.P.	Lincoln	

=== Television ===
Year	Title	Role	Notes
2007	America's Most Smartest Model	Himself	Reality Competition show
2006	South Beach	Sean	Episode: "I'll Do What I Want To Do"
2005	Byte Me	Presenter	TV series
2009	Criminal Minds	Carl Cade	Episode: "Conflicted"

== Personal life ==
Brett Novek lived with fellow America's Most Smartest Model contestant Jeff Pickel in Los Angeles, California. He currently lives with fellow model/actor Erik Fellows.

== See also ==
- List of male underwear models
