= America's Most Smartest Model =

- Title Card
- Created by: Mark Cronin; Cris Abrego
- Directed by: Zach Kozek; Robert Sizemore; Mike L. Taylor
- Judges: Mary Alice Stephenson; Ben Stein
- Composer: Adam Zelkind
- Country of origin: United States
- Original language: English
- No. of seasons: 1
- No. of episodes: 11

Production
- Executive producers: Mark Cronin; Cris Abrego; Ben Samek; Matt Odgers; For VH1: Jill Holmes; Kristen Kelly; Stella Stolper; Alex Demyanenko; Michael Hirschorn; Jeff Olde
- Cinematography: Dave Miller
- Running time: 44 min. approx
- Production companies: 51 Minds Entertainment; VH1

Original release
- Network: VH1
- Release: October 7 – December 16, 2007

America's Most Smartest Model is an American reality television show that aired on VH1. The hosts were Ben Stein and Mary Alice Stephenson. The show attempted to find brains behind beauty in a series of challenges, and would grant the winner $100,000, a feature in an upcoming VO5 ad, and the title of America's Most Smartest Model.

The winner of the competition was 22 year-old VJ Logan from Grass Valley, California.

== Contestants ==
Contestants

(ages stated are at start of filming)

Contestant	Age^{[A]}	Hometown	Finish	Place
Slavco Tuskaloski	26	New York City/Macedonia	Episode 1	16-15
Jamie Everett	26	Houston, TX	Episode 1	16-15
Victoria Fisher	22	Corona Del Mar, CA	Episode 1	14-13
Gaston Willig	27	Argentina	Episode 1	14-13
Erika Medina	22	Anaheim, CA	Episode 2	12
Mandy Lynn	27	Long Island, NY	Episode 3	11
Jesse Lewis	26	Sacramento, CA	Episode 4	10
Lisa Byrnes	27	Scottsdale, AZ	Episode 5	9
Rachel Myers	27	Palm Springs, CA	Episode 6	8
Daniel Schuman	24	Saddle Brook, NJ	Episode 7	7
Jeff Pickel	25	Chicago, IL	Episode 8	6
Rachael Murphy	25	Sydney, Australia	Episode 9	5
Brett Novek	23	Fort Lauderdale, FL	Episode 9	4
Angela Hart	25	San Francisco, CA	Episode 10	3
Andre Birleanu	25	Moscow, Russia	Episode 11	2
Van "VJ" Logan	22	Grass Valley, CA	Episode 11	1

== Episodes ==
=== Balls, Cherries, Balloons, Tires ===
First aired October 7, 2007 (1.6M viewers)

- Edge Challenge Winner: Daniel
- Callback Challenge Winner: Brett
- Eliminated: Victoria, Gaston, Slavco, Jamie

=== Governor of Presidents ===
- Edge Challenge Winners: Rachael Murphy, Pickel
- Callback Challenge Winners: Rachael Murphy, Pickel
- Bottom Four: Daniel, Jesse, Mandy Lynn, Erika
- Eliminated: Erika

=== Balm and Gilad ===
- Special Guest Star: Gilad Janklowicz
- Edge Challenge Winners: VJ, Pickel, Brett
- Callback Challenge Winner: Brett
- Bottom Three: Rachel Myers, Jesse, Mandy Lynn
- Eliminated: Mandy Lynn

=== Night of the Hairy Grizilla Monster ===
- Special Guest Star: Bill Nye
- Edge Challenge Winners: Daniel, Angela
- Callback Challenge Winners: Andre, Rachael Murphy
- Bottom Three: Rachel Myers, Lisa, Jesse
- Eliminated: Jesse

=== That's Not How I Like My Pork! ===
- Edge Challenge Winner: Daniel
- Callback Challenge Winner: VJ
- Bottom Two: Rachel Myers, Lisa
- Eliminated: Lisa

=== Are You Ready to Rhombus? ===
- Edge Challenge Winners: Pickel, Brett
- Callback Challenge Winners: Pickel, Brett
- Bottom Four: VJ, Rachael Murphy, Daniel, Rachel Myers
- Eliminated: Rachel Myers

=== Many Happy Returns? ===
- Edge Challenge Winner: VJ
- Callback Challenge Winner: Andre
- Bottom Three: Angela, Rachael, Daniel
- Eliminated: Daniel

=== Let's Play, Hide the Pickel ===
- Edge Challenge Winners: Angela, VJ
- Callback Challenge Winner: Angela
- Bottom Three: Andre, Brett, Pickel
- Eliminated: Pickel

=== I See Dead People... ===
- Edge Challenge Winners: Andre, Rachael
- Callback Challenge Winner: Angela, VJ
- Bottom Three: Andre, Brett, Rachael
- Eliminated: Brett, Rachael

=== Hit Me with Your Best Shot ===
- Edge Challenge Winner: Andre
- Bottom Two: VJ, Angela
- Eliminated: Angela

=== Never Trust a Rottweiler ===
First aired December 17, 2007 (1M viewers)

- Runner-Up: Andre
- Winner: VJ

== Elimination table ==
Rank	Contestant	Episodes											
Rank	Contestant	1		2	3	4	5	6	7	8	9	10	11
Rank	Edge winner(s)	Daniel		Pickel; Rachael	Brett; Pickel; VJ	Angela; Daniel	Daniel	Brett; Pickel	VJ	Angela; VJ	Andre; Rachael	Andre	None
1	VJ	SAFE	SAFE	SAFE	SAFE	SAFE	WIN	LOW	HIGH	SAFE	WIN	LOW	WINNER
2	Andre	SAFE	SAFE	HIGH	SAFE	WIN	SAFE	SAFE	WIN	LOW	LOW	HIGH	OUT
3	Angela	SAFE	SAFE	SAFE	SAFE	SAFE	HIGH	SAFE	LOW	WIN	WIN	OUT	
4	Brett	SAFE	WIN	SAFE	WIN	HIGH	SAFE	WIN	SAFE	LOW	OUT		
5	Rachael	SAFE	SAFE	WIN	HIGH	WIN	HIGH	LOW	LOW	SAFE	OUT		
6	Pickel	SAFE	SAFE	WIN	SAFE	HIGH	SAFE	WIN	SAFE	OUT			
7	Daniel	SAFE	SAFE	LOW	SAFE	SAFE	SAFE	LOW	OUT				
8	Rachel	SAFE	SAFE	SAFE	LOW	LOW	LOW	OUT					
9	Lisa	SAFE	SAFE	HIGH	SAFE	LOW	OUT						
10	Jesse	SAFE	HIGH	LOW	LOW	OUT							
11	Mandy Lynn	LOW	LOW	LOW	OUT								
12	Erika	SAFE	SAFE	OUT									
13	Gaston	SAFE	OUT										
14	Victoria	SAFE	OUT										
16 - 15	Jamie	OUT											
16 - 15	Slavco	OUT											

The contestant was eliminated before the elimination ceremony.
The contestant won the callback challenge
The contestant was selected as one of the top entries in the callback challenge, but did not win.
The contestant was selected as one of the bottom entries in the callback challenge, but was not eliminated.
The contestant was eliminated.
The contestant won the competition

- Because Rachel was eliminated at the callback challenge in episode 6, no one was eliminated at the elimination ceremony.
- Episode 9 featured a double elimination.

== See also ==
- America's Next Top Model (2003)
- Make Me a Supermodel (2008)
