= April Scott =

American model, actress (b. 1979)

- Born: April Ann McIntosh; January 29, 1979 (age 46); Campbell, Missouri, U.S.
- Occupation(s): Actress, model, TV host
- Years active: 1998–present

April Ann McIntosh (born January 29, 1979) is an American actress and former model known professionally as April Scott. She has appeared on television programs such as CSI: Miami and It's Always Sunny in Philadelphia, as well as films such as The Dukes of Hazzard: The Beginning, The Penthouse and Living Will.

== Early life ==
Scott was born in Campbell, Missouri and is of French, Spanish, and Native American ancestry. During high school, she was a frequent sight at beauty pageants winning 45 titles. Upon graduating from Campbell High School in 1997, she enrolled in College of the Ozarks, in Point Lookout, Missouri. She graduated valedictorian of her class (4.083 GPA) with a degree in Theater and a minor in rhetoric. Soon after graduating from college in 2002, Scott moved to Los Angeles to begin an acting career.

== Modeling career ==
Scott was named one of People Magazine's 100 Most Beautiful People in 2006. Also in that year, she was the face of Merle Norman Cosmetics, appearing in several of Norman's ads and commercials. She has shot campaigns for the lingerie companies: Dreamgirl, Fredericks of Hollywood, Hustler, Shirley's of Hollywood, Forplay, Escante, Minor Creations, and Hey Baby. She has modeled clothing and swimwear for numerous commercial companies including: Target, Macy's, Sears, JC Penneys, Venus Swimwear, and Boston Proper. Magazine cover credits include: Maxim Magazine (Dec 2007) People Magazine (April 2008) Rounder (March 2008) Breed (Feb 2008) Sense (Dec 2010) 944 (Dec 2006) Fitness RX (September 2006 issue) Import Tuner (October 2006 issue), Knockout Magazine (2008), Image Magazine (May 2009), Warning Magazine (Jan/Feb2009), Women's World Magazine (March 2011), Glam Couture Magazine (April 2011), Temptations Magazine (Aug 2011), Glam Couture Magazine (2014). She has appeared in several billboards for Coors Light, Bud Light, Miller Lite, Busch Light, and The Showbiz Show with David Spade.

== Acting career ==
Scott's acting career includes shows such as Entourage, The Shield, Ripley's Believe It or Not!, It's Always Sunny in Philadelphia, and CSI: Miami. She also hosted Ripe TV, Octane TV, and ESPN2's The Hook, where she interviewed extreme sports athletes. In 2006, she became a model on NBC's hit game show, Deal or No Deal. July 2006 she was cast in the film The Dukes of Hazzard: The Beginning as Daisy Duke (previously portrayed by Jessica Simpson in 2005 and Catherine Bach in the original series). The film was released in March 2007. She also has starred in films such as Living Will, The Penthouse, I Do...I Did, Coma, Nitetales: The Movie, and Nitetales 2.

== Awards ==
April was listed in People magazine's 100 Most Beautiful People of 2006, ranked No. 76 on the Maxim Hot 100 list of 2006, No. 63 on Maxim's Hot 100 list of 2007, #62 in Stuff Magazine's Sexiest 100 Celebrities of 2007 and No. 75 in AskMen.com Top 99 Women of 2008. She appeared on the cover of Maxim's 2008 Celebrity Calendar, and is on FHM's 2008 list of 100 Sexiest Women in the World.

- 2016 San Diego Film Festival - Best Short Film (For Blood) (Winner)
- 2016 San Diego Film Festival - Best Cinematography (For Blood) (Winner)
- 2017 Vancouver Badass Film Festival - Best Supporting Actress (For Blood- Lady Blade) (Nomination)
- 2017 Vancouver Badass Film Festival - Best Short Film (For Blood) (Winner)

== Filmography ==
=== Film ===
Year	Title	Role	Notes
2009	I Do... I Did	Jenny	Direct to video
2010	The Penthouse	Trista	Direct to video
2011	Living Will	Krista	Direct to video, also producer
2015	For Blood	Lady Blade	Short film, also associate producer

=== Television ===
Year	Title	Role	Notes
2003	The Shield	Trish	Episode: "Inferno"
2003	CSI: Miami	Tess Kimball	Episode: "Blood Brothers"
2004	Entourage	Girl in Bikini / Model	Episode: "Talk Show" (uncredited, as Model), Episode: "Busey and the Beach" (uncredited, as Girl in Bikini)
2005-06	Deal or No Deal (American game show)	Case #14 / Case #19	39 episodes
2007	The Dukes of Hazzard: The Beginning	Daisy Duke	Television film
2013	It's Always Sunny in Philadelphia	Glenda the Gorgeous Gunman	Episode: "The Gang Saves the Day"

=== Web ===
Year	Title	Role	Notes
2009	Nite Tales: The Series	Model	Episode: "Trapped"

== Theater ==
- Ghosts (1998) ... Mrs. Alving
- Last Night at Ballyhoo (1998) ... Sunny
- Girl Crazy (1998) ... Babs
- Quiet in the Land (1999) ... Nancy
- Children of Eden (2000) ... Mary
- Greenwillow (2000) ... Maidy
- Graceland (2000) ... Bev
- You Can't Take It with You (2000) ... Essie
- Cosmic Christmas (2000) ... Aegus
- Trapped (2001) ... Ruak
- The Office (2001) ... Fran
- Passing Through (2001) ... Susan
