= DNA (magazine) =

Australian magazine for gay men

- Editor: Andrew Creagh
- Categories: Gay
- Frequency: Monthly
- Founded: 2000
- Company: DNA Publications Pty Ltd
- Country: Australia
- Based in: Sydney
- Language: English
- Website: dnamagazine.com.au
- ISSN: 1443-1122

DNA is an Australian monthly magazine targeted at gay men. The magazine was founded by Andrew Creagh in 2000, who is also the managing editor of the publication. It features topical news and stories on celebrities, entertainment, lifestyle, fashion, pop culture reviews, articles on fitness, grooming, and health tips, along with photography features.

The magazine is available in print throughout news agencies and selected bookstores in Australia, New Zealand, Canada, the US, the UK and across Europe. The magazine is also available online through online publication stores, including DNAstore, iTunes, Pocketmags, Amazon Kindle, Windows and Google Play.

== History ==
DNA magazine was founded by Andrew Creagh in 2000, who acts as the managing editor of the magazine. Creagh had previously worked as the deputy editor for Studio Magazines in Australia which included over ten publications, including Blue an LGBT magazine focusing on gay culture, Black+White a photographic based magazine that included photographic features, and Studio for Men a monthly publication focusing on men's fashion and editorials.

Creagh has been actively involved in the curation of the magazine from its inception and continues to play a significant role in both its commercial expansion and editorial development as a domestic publication that has expanded into several global markets.

== Content ==
Notable local and international celebrities who have featured in the magazine include Boy George, Madonna, Adam Lambert, Rufus Wainwright, Ian Thorpe, Matthew Mitcham and Rhys Nicholson.

The magazine also features routine monthly articles on fashion, fitness and entertainment, including revues on local domestic theatre, movies, arts, and key LGBT events such as the Sydney Gay Mardi Gras and DNA sponsored events, like the annual Ivy Pool Party held in Sydney, Australia.

Past issues of the magazine routinely include health and well-being articles including transformation features, where a volunteer undergoes a three-month training transformation, to put some of their training routines to the test including a before and after testimonial. In more recent years, the magazine has focused on fitness programs curated by personal trainers from senior industry fitness and health professionals.

DNA magazine has also been proactive in promoting equal rights and same-sex marriage equality. The magazine's #208 Wedding issue celebrated same-sex marriage with articles on same-sex couples from around the globe. The issue featured three gay couples, including a range of wedding styles including recommendations on suit, ring and reception options. The issue included a Las Vegas ceremony involving Cher and Diana Ross, and a beach wedding in Thailand. The issue also featured interviews with gay families including an interview with foster dads Stefan and James and their joy in being a foster family which addressed the many hurdles faced by gay couples in fostering and gaining adoption.

In addition to celebrity interviews highlighting people from the LGBT community, the magazine has also featured more serious subject matters including features on gay hate crime and the rights of the LGBT community in countries where homosexuality is still illegal including the plight of gay men in Afghanistan.

The magazine has included a series called ‘Straight Mates’ which promote the achievements of straight men who have been keen advocates in promoting the rights of gay men and the LGBT community. The ‘Straight Mate’ series has included interviews with AFL footballer, Tony Armstrong and singer David Campbell.

The magazine has sought to address issues of diversity in recent years by featuring the key achievements made by Indigenous gay Australians including comedian and actor Steven Oliver and Australian actor and TV presenter Matty Mills. The magazine's yearly Indigenous NAIDOC feature aims to highlight the achievements of Indigenous gay men and create broader public visibility.

Additional contributors to the magazine have been Neal Drinnan, Australian author Benjamin Law, and journalist, LGBT commentator and comedian Rhys Nicholson.

== Cover models ==
The magazine has sourced its cover models from high-profile international fitness and industry models, including fitness model and personal trainer Sergey Boytcov, Vlad and Dmitry Averyanov.

In issue #258, the magazine featured its first gay couple as cover models including Australian actor Hugh Sheridan and his fiancé Kurt Roberts. The magazine has been an advocate of same-sex marriage which was legalised in Australia in 2017.

In issue #254, the magazine featured its first Asian gay male cover model, Wilson Lai, who is a high-profile fitness trainer and Instagram influencer.

== Special editions ==
DNA Men: A Photographic Special Edition

DNA magazine has published several special collector editions of the magazine titled DNA Men, which feature a collection of photographic features, including many of their more popular cover models, including Elvis Di Fazio and Alex Wightman.

Special Reader Made Edition

The Reader Made Edition published in June 2014 included over 50 international submissions made by readers. The content included stories covering marriage equality, ageing in the gay community, coming out stories, finding love in the digital age, homophobia and violence, personal histories and articles on the joys of pet ownership. The issue aimed to include a variety of content from gay people from across the globe and enable them to share their stories, bringing more awareness to their different experiences, challenges and achievements. Andrew Creagh, the managing editor of the magazine, stated: "The reader-made concept has been applied a couple of times in overseas magazines and I think it's really exciting. It gives our readers a voice and helps us connect with them in a meaningful and direct way."

== Criticism ==
The magazine has come under broader criticism for its lack of inclusivity in featuring predominantly white male athletes and models on its cover, and its photographic features, which mainly include images of young hyper-masculine men which default into stereotypes of gay men and the gay community as a projected ideal of masculinity.

The magazine has also come under scrutiny for its lack of portraying racial diversity in the gay community, with its focus on including models and athletes from white European origins, several academics have cited this as problematic in representing the gay community through a largely gay white middle-class perspective that does not represent the broader gay community both within Australia or abroad. The magazine in recent times has sought to address some of these broader concerns and feedback by featuring the achievements of Indigenous Gay Australians and including a broader selection of feature and cover models, including Wilson Lai, who was the first Asian cover model to be featured on the magazine.

== See also ==
- List of LGBT publications
- List of LGBT periodicals
