= The Penthouse (2010 film) =

2010 film by Chris Levitus

- Directed by: Chris Levitus
- Written by: Corey Large; Chris Levitus
- Produced by: Corey Large; Alan Pao
- Starring: Rider Strong; Corey Large; April Scott; James DeBello; Kaley Cuoco; Jimmy Jean-Louis; Jon Abrahams; Mýa
- Cinematography: Roger Chingirian
- Edited by: Christian Masini
- Music by: David Gregory Byrne; Ralph Rieckermann
- Distributed by: Wingman Productions
- Release date: March 2, 2010
- Running time: 89 minutes
- Country: United States
- Language: English
- Budget: $3 million

The Penthouse is a sex comedy film starring Rider Strong, Corey Large, April Scott, James DeBello, Kaley Cuoco, Jimmy Jean-Louis, Jon Abrahams, and Mýa, the film was co-written and directed by Chris Levitus and released to DVD March 2, 2010.

== Plot ==
The winner of a reality television show invites his two best friends to share the Los Angeles penthouse he won for coming in first place, and quickly finds out why living with your pals is not always the best idea. Realising that a bachelor pad is no fun when you are flying solo, Tyler (Large) invites Kieran (Strong) and another friend to come partake in the debauchery. A struggling writer who is reluctant to commit to his longtime girlfriend, Kieran quickly takes Tyler up on the offer, and before long life is one non-stop party. The strains in Tyler and Kieran's friendship start to show, however, when Tyler's flirtatious younger sister arrives for a visit, and puts the moves on Kieran.

== Cast ==
- Rider Strong as Kieran
- Corey Large as Tyler
- James DeBello as Heath
- April Scott as Trista
- Kaley Cuoco as Erica Roc
- Mýa as Mitra
- Nikki Griffin as Lexi
- Lochlyn Munro as Barry
- Jimmy Jean-Louis as Buzz McManus
- Jon Abrahams as Tyler's Agent
- Joe De La Rosa as Realtor
- Brett Novek as Joey
- Kurupt as 'Strangers' Host
- Ed Begley, Jr. as Nicholas
- Lin Shaye as Frances Roc
- Patrick Durham as Agent X
