= Vánky =

Vánky is a surname of Hungarian origin. Notable people with the surname include:

- Farkas Vánky, Swedish cardiac and thoracic surgeon at Linköping University Hospital
- Kálmán Vánky (born 1930), Hungarian mycologist
- Péter Vánky (born 1968), Romanian-born Swedish fencer

== See also ==
- Vanko
