= Living Will =

2011 American comedy film

- Directed by: Matthew Lauyer
- Written by: Roy Koriakin; Allan Delikat
- Produced by: Ryan Dunn; Roy Koriakin
- Starring: Ryan Dunn; April Scott; Bam Margera
- Edited by: Matthew Lauyer
- Distributed by: KPHAT Productions
- Release date: October 4, 2011 (direct-to-video)
- Running time: 102 Minutes
- Country: United States
- Language: English

Living Will is an American comedy film starring Ryan Dunn, Bam Margera and April Scott.

== Cast ==
- Ryan Dunn - Belcher
- Gerard Haitz - Will
- April Scott - Krista

== Production ==
In 2011, the domestic distribution rights to the film were purchased by Lions Gate Entertainment. The studio had originally planned an October 2011 release for the film but after the death of Ryan Dunn on June 20, 2011, the studio announced that it no longer had any plans to release the film theatrically. The film was released direct-to-video on October 4, 2011.

== Reception ==
DVD Talk said, "The storyline gets predictable in spots and seems more intent on throwing in some (very welcome) nudity and (admittedly funny) crass jokes than to develop the story and the characters as fully as it could have."
