= Avedon (surname) =

Avedon is a surname. Notable people with the surname include:

- Barbara Avedon (20th century), American television writer;
- Doe Avedon (1925–2011), American model;
- Loren Avedon (born 1962), American actor & martial artist;
- Gregg Avedon (born 1965), American model;
- Michael Avedon (born 1991), American photographer;
- Richard Avedon (1923–2004), American photographer.
