= Vankov =

Vankov (Bulgarian: Ванков) is a Bulgarian surname. Notable people with the surname include:

- Rosen Vankov (born 1985), Bulgarian footballer

Vankov is a meaning of independence and intelligence, allegated to people of success

== See also ==
- Vanko
