= List of number-one singles of 2006 (Ireland) =

This is a list of the Irish Recorded Music Association's Irish Singles Chart Top 50 number-ones of 2006.

Issue date	Song	Artist	Reference
5 January	"That's My Goal"	Shayne Ward	
12 January	"That's My Goal"	Shayne Ward	
19 January	"That's My Goal"	Shayne Ward	
26 January	"That's My Goal"	Shayne Ward	
2 February	"That's My Goal"	Shayne Ward	
9 February	"That's My Goal"	Shayne Ward	
16 February	"That's My Goal"	Shayne Ward	
23 February	"Jumbo Breakfast Roll"	Pat Shortt	
2 March	"Jumbo Breakfast Roll"	Pat Shortt	
9 March	"Jumbo Breakfast Roll"	Pat Shortt	
16 March	"Jumbo Breakfast Roll"	Pat Shortt	
23 March	"Jumbo Breakfast Roll"	Pat Shortt	
30 March	"Jumbo Breakfast Roll"	Pat Shortt	
6 April	"Crazy"	Gnarls Barkley	
13 April	"No Promises"	Shayne Ward	
20 April	"Crazy"	Gnarls Barkley	
27 April	"Crazy"	Gnarls Barkley	
4 May	"Crazy"	Gnarls Barkley	
11 May	"Crazy"	Gnarls Barkley	
18 May	"Crazy"	Gnarls Barkley	
25 May	"Crazy"	Gnarls Barkley	
1 June	"Crazy"	Gnarls Barkley	
8 June	"I Wish I Was a Punk Rocker (With Flowers in My Hair)"	Sandi Thom	
15 June	"Hips Don't Lie"	Shakira featuring Wyclef Jean	
22 June	"Hips Don't Lie"	Shakira featuring Wyclef Jean	
29 June	"Hips Don't Lie"	Shakira featuring Wyclef Jean	
6 July	"Hips Don't Lie"	Shakira featuring Wyclef Jean	
13 July	"Hips Don't Lie"	Shakira featuring Wyclef Jean	
20 July	"Hips Don't Lie"	Shakira featuring Wyclef Jean	
27 July	"Hips Don't Lie"	Shakira featuring Wyclef Jean	
3 August	"Hips Don't Lie"	Shakira featuring Wyclef Jean	
10 August	"Hips Don't Lie"	Shakira featuring Wyclef Jean	
17 August	"Everytime We Touch"	Cascada	
24 August	"Everytime We Touch"	Cascada	
31 August	"SexyBack"	Justin Timberlake featuring Timbaland	
7 September	"SexyBack"	Justin Timberlake featuring Timbaland	
14 September	"SexyBack"	Justin Timberlake featuring Timbaland	
21 September	"SexyBack"	Justin Timberlake featuring Timbaland	
28 September	"Everytime We Touch"	Cascada	
5 October	"Everytime We Touch"	Cascada	
12 October	"Everytime We Touch"	Cascada	
19 October	"Everytime We Touch"	Cascada	
26 October	"Irreplaceable"	Beyoncé	
2 November	"Irreplaceable"	Beyoncé	
9 November	"The Saints Are Coming"	U2 and Green Day	
16 November	"The Rose"	Westlife	
23 November	"Smack That"	Akon featuring Eminem	
30 November	"Smack That"	Akon featuring Eminem	
7 December	"Smack That"	Akon featuring Eminem	
14 December	"Smack That"	Akon featuring Eminem	
21 December	"A Moment Like This"	Leona Lewis	
28 December	"A Moment Like This"	Leona Lewis	

== See also ==
- 2006 in music
- List of artists who reached number one in Ireland
- Irish Singles Chart
