= SexyBack =

2006 single by Justin Timberlake

Single by Justin Timberlake featuring Timbaland

from the album FutureSex/LoveSounds
- Released: July 18, 2006
- Recorded: December 2005
- Studio: Thomas Crown (Virginia Beach, Virginia)
- Genre: Electro-R&B; hip-hop; disco; dance-pop
- Length: 4:02
- Label: Jive; Zomba
- Songwriters: Justin Timberlake; Timothy Mosley; Nate Hills
- Producers: Justin Timberlake; Timbaland; Danja

Justin Timberlake singles chronology
"Signs" (2005)	"SexyBack" (2006)	"My Love" (2006)

Music video
- "SexyBack" on YouTube

"SexyBack" is a song by American singer Justin Timberlake featuring American record producer Timbaland from the former's second studio album, FutureSex/LoveSounds (2006). It was released to US mainstream and rhythmic radio stations by Jive Records as the lead single from the album on July 18, 2006. The song was written and produced by Danja, Timbaland, and Timberlake. Discussing "SexyBack", Timberlake revealed that he went "left", singing the song in a rock style, not an R&B style. He described the song as musicians David Bowie and David Byrne "covering" James Brown's 1970 song "Sex Machine". The track features Timbaland on backing vocals while Timberlake's voice is distorted. The instrumentation used in the song includes a pounding bass beat, electronic chords, and drum machine sounds.

"SexyBack" became Timberlake's first number-one single as a solo artist on the Billboard Hot 100, staying seven weeks at the top spot. It also topped several of Billboard magazine's other charts, including the Mainstream Top 40, Hot Dance Airplay, and Hot Digital Songs, and entered the top ten on most singles charts. Internationally, it became Timberlake's first single to reach number one in the United Kingdom. In Australia, the track was Timberlake's second number-one single, spending two consecutive weeks at the top. "SexyBack" was certified Diamond by the Recording Industry Association of America (RIAA) and three-times platinum by the Canadian Recording Industry Association (CRIA).

The track won the Grammy Award for Best Dance Recording at the 2007 ceremony. In addition, the song won Timberlake the People's Choice Award for Favorite R&B song and the Male Artist of the Year at the 2007 MTV Video Music Awards. The music video was filmed in June 2006; Timberlake decided to work with director Michael Haussman based on the latter's work on Madonna's 1994 music video "Take a Bow".

== Background and production ==
In November 2002, Justin Timberlake released his debut solo album, Justified, which was a commercial success and received generally positive reviews from music critics. The album spawned four singles, including "Rock Your Body" and "Cry Me a River", which reached the top-five of the US Billboard Hot 100. After its release, Timberlake thought he "lost his voice" in the sense that he did not like what he was doing. He felt "burnt out" after Justified and he took a break from the music industry to become a film actor. His first role during this time was a journalist in the thriller Edison Force (2006). He also appeared in the 2006 films Alpha Dog, Black Snake Moan, and Southland Tales, and voiced Prince Artie Pendragon in the animated film Shrek the Third (2007).

When Timberlake felt inspired to compose songs again, he chose not to reunite with his former band NSYNC, though he considered it after his first record. Timberlake went to Justified collaborator Timbaland's new Thomas Crown Studios in Virginia Beach, Virginia, to begin sessions for his second album. Neither Timberlake nor Timbaland had any idea of what the album would be; there was no plan or title for it. Timberlake began working on his second studio album, FutureSex/LoveSounds, in December 2005. Within three weeks, "SexyBack" was one of several songs that were recorded for the album, having been recorded in less than a day. Timberlake told The Weekend Mail in 2006 that it was the "second or third song" he did with Timbaland in a list of 10 songs they recorded for the album.

The song was written and produced by Justin Timberlake, Timbaland, and Nate "Danja" Hills, and mixed by Jimmy Douglass, using Pro Tools. Mixing took place in April 2006, using a Neve VR-series console. Hills played the Akai MPC3000, as well as virtual synths on his Macintosh computer, while Timbaland performed instruments on the Ensoniq ASR-10 sampling keyboard. Bill Pettaway played the guitar, his part taking only two minutes to record, while Darryl Pearson was the bassist. Both the guitar and bass were digitally imported in Pro Tools during mixing, and only a section of the guitar recording was copied and pasted throughout the song.

== Composition ==
=== Music ===
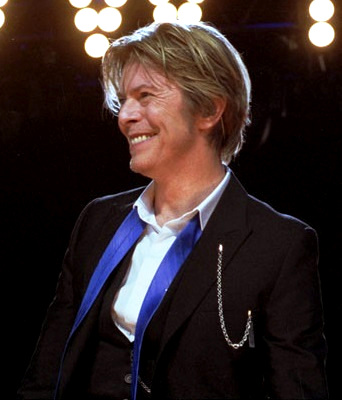
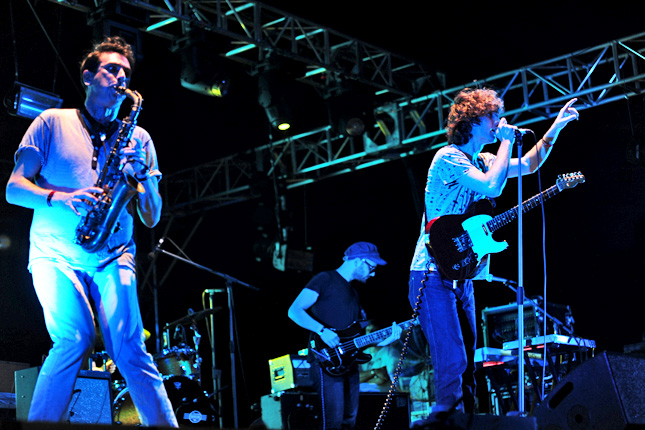
David Bowie (left) and the Rapture (right), two artists that were cited as influences for "SexyBack".

Timberlake described "SexyBack" as "an experiment gone right from the sort of synthesizer influence to the distorted vocals", adding that it was "one of the songs that the more you listen to it its just hook after hook after hook. Its just one of those 'flow off the top of your head' tracks, in terms of melody. We wanted to keep it loose and not too rehearsed, it's one of those very experimental records though." Timberlake revealed that he went "left", regarding going more rock, not in how he developed the song, but in the way he sang the song. "I wanted to sing the song like a rock and roll singer, not an R&B singer. That's the approach." The day before recording, Timberlake and Timbaland had listened to David Bowie's "Rebel Rebel" and the Rapture's "House of Jealous Lovers". Timberlake wanted to achieve the songs' "raw energy". Timberlake said that he modeled himself on Bowie and Prince, and described the song as Bowie and David Byrne "covering" James Brown's 1970 song "Sex Machine". Timberlake said that the song "doesn't qualify as rock or straight funk" and that he was happy with the description "club funk". He was "keen for a new musical direction" following the release of his first album, Justified. "I listened to the radio for a few months and thought, 'All this sounds like shit, what do I want to hear?'. That's really all I did. Everything's [sic] got so repetitive, everything sounds the same. I had to create something unique otherwise there's no point putting it out."

"SexyBack" excerpt
A 25-second sample of Justin Timberlake's "SexyBack". The song is built around a pounding bass beat, electronic chords, and beat box sounds.

"SexyBack" is an "urgent, pulsing track, a cocktail of soaring, distorted vocals and heavy, electronic chords threaded together with rap", according to Camilla Long from The Observer. The song is performed in the key of A phrygian mode and is set in time signature of common time with a tempo of 117 beats per minute. The song's musicscape includes two-note dirty electronic riffs, "leapfrogging keyboards", beat box sound, and incorporates the "same leaky faucet" sounds of musician Obie Trice's 2004 song "The Setup". In addition, the track features Timbaland on backing vocals.

Timberlake's voice in the song is processed, slowed down to where his voice is unrecognizable, with muffled vocals. The song also features Timberlake's "low register distorted vocals." Timberlake revealed that the vocals in the song were influenced by Prince.

=== Lyrics ===
Douglass explained the title of the song, and how it affected the concept: "Justin [Timberlake] goes in the chorus 'Go head be gone with it', I called the song 'Be Gone With It', just to label it. So they're developing this song and they're going nuts and loving it, and as they play it, and I'm like: 'I don't think this hook is strong enough.' But then, at the very last minute, Justin very, very cleverly decided to call it 'SexyBack'." He admitted that the song was not going to be titled "SexyBack", saying, "We weren't originally going to call it 'SexyBack'. I definitely didn't think it would become the most worn-out phrase of 2006. It just sounded like a nice opening to the song."

Adam Graham of The Detroit News noted that Timberlake sings about whips and chains, while Bill Lamb of About.com said the song has a "bit of s&m tease about shackles and whips". Furthermore, The Georgia Straight's Martin Turenne said that Timberlake is "shackled to the bedpost, invites the crack of his mistress's whip." Ben Williams of New York magazine wrote that Timberlake had been working on his pickup lines, with "You see these shackles baby I'm your slave / I'll let you whip me if I misbehave." Jason Bracelin of the Las Vegas Review-Journal reported that Timberlake sings about "threatening to steal your girl." Charlie Brooker for The Guardian, in regard to the lyric, "them other fuckers don't know how to act", writing that Timberlake's translation is of him telling everyone in the world that they are a "clueless fornicator". Further in his report, Brooker opined that Timberlake "threatens us" by using "language so offensive" with the line, "You motherfuckers, watch how I attack". In addition, Brooker noted that the line, "If that's your girl you'd better watch your back", as Timberlake stating his intention to meddle in the private affairs of others. Barry Schwartz of Stylus noted that the song features "pillow talk", in reference of the song's "sex-crazed lyrics".

== Critical reception ==
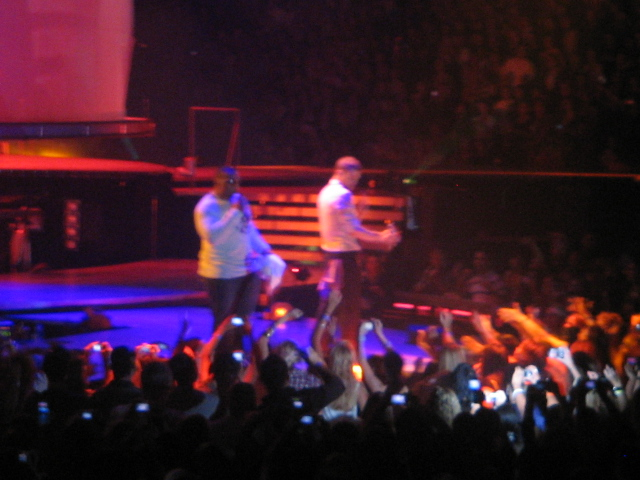
Timbaland and Justin Timberlake performing "SexyBack" during Timberlake's 2007 FutureSex/LoveShow concert tour

In the Billboard magazine review of the album, contributor Katy Kroll wrote that Timberlake "claims to be bringing 'sexy' back to pop music, and indeed he is. You can almost feel beads of sweat rolling off the title track and 'SexyBack' featuring Timbaland". Chris Willman of Entertainment Weekly was complimentary towards Timbaland, producer of the song, writing that Timbaland offers "tougher, trickier rhythms, minimal live playing, a plethora of hip-hop cameos, and a self-consciously hard, edgy club sensibility" to "SexyBack". Russell Baillie of The New Zealand Herald noted, "The producer's angular synthesizer crunch is all over it – at best on the single 'SexyBack' where they dispense with a chorus, leaving the song sustained by its vocal fireworks, electrofunk and Timberlake's repeated declaration that 'I'm bringing sexy back.'" PopMatters' contributor Quentin B. Huff wrote that "SexyBack" was the "fraternal twin" to Nelly Furtado's 2006 song "Promiscuous". Andrew Murfett of The Age wrote that the song was a "raunchy club banger that slyly suppresses" Timberlake's customary falsetto. He continues, "it's introduced a new phrase into the pop cultural lexicon". Glenn Gamboa of Newsday was complimentary towards the song, writing that it was "Timberlake at his best, mainstreaming a combination of the wild, edgy dance-pop style of Basement Jaxx with Missy Elliott's more experimental hip-hop to create a boldly inventive sound that still pleases the masses."

Kelefa Sanneh of The New York Times wrote: "...'SexyBack', a twitchy, emaciated track that shot to the top of the charts and also became an irritating catchphrase. (Suddenly everyone was bringing AdjectiveBack.)" Dagny Salas of North by Northwestern commented that Timberlake and Timbaland trade ridiculous lines, with "Get your sexy on/Go ahead, be gone with it" and "Dirty babe/You see these shackles/Baby I'm your slave/I'll let you whip me if I misbehave." Salas continued in her review that it was not a song that should be good, "but does that really matter when it's good in the way that songs are during the summer [...] That kind of good makes songs like 'SexyBack' completely irresistible." Matt Burns of The Post wrote, "Take the polarizing summer single 'SexyBack', a repetitive song with little structure that doesn't know when to stop, all centered on a ridiculous declaration. Somehow, it works." The Diamondback's Michael Greenwald reported that "SexyBack" was "lyrically, musically and vocally the weakest song" on the album. A writer of The State Journal-Register was not impressed with the song and concluded, with "'SexyBack' is the most annoyingly dumb song to hit Billboard's No. 1 since 'Hollaback Girl'". Guy Blackman of The Sunday Age wrote: "The distorted vocals and stilted production of first single 'Sexyback' make Timberlake's claim to be 'bringing sexy back' ... seem almost laughable." Entertainment Weekly put it on its end-of-the-decade, "best-of" list, saying, "Justin Timberlake, we didn't even know that sexy was missing until 2006. We're just happy Justin brought it back safe and sound." Charlie Brooker, columnist for The Guardian, jokingly criticized Timberlake, saying "How DARE this dot-eyed, crop-haired, fun-sized, guff-tongued, pirouetting waif-boy scamper on to the world's airwaves and loudly proclaim to be the sole global administrator of all things sexy? You'd think it takes massive balls to do something like that, but given the shrill, squeaking vocals cheeping through his ghastly little gobhole, it's safe to assume he's got testes the size of capers. He's practically a human dog whistle, the shrieking, high-pitched, mosquito-lunged ponce."

Upon the song's release, it received divided opinions, which pleased Timberlake. "This is such a departure from the first record," said Timberlake. "More people might like it, less people might like it, but you can't call me a chicken."

== Commercial performance ==
"SexyBack" was commercially successful in the United States. The single debuted at number 90 on the Billboard Hot 100 in July 2006. After climbing to number 31, it jumped to number one the following week. "SexyBack" became Timberlake's first number-one hit on the Billboard Hot 100 from his FutureSex/LoveSounds album. The single spent seven consecutive weeks at the number-one position on the Hot 100. In addition to the Hot 100, "SexyBack" also topped the following Billboard charts: Hot Dance Airplay, Hot Dance Club Play, Hot Dance Singles Sales, Pop 100 Airplay, Pop 100, and Top 40 Mainstream charts. "SexyBack" was certified Diamond by the Recording Industry Association of America (RIAA). This song made the then-seventh-biggest jump to number one in the Billboard Hot 100 history, climbing thirty spots from number 31 landing it at the summit of the chart on September 9, 2006. According to Nielsen SoundScan, the song had its biggest selling week in September 2006 and sold 250,000 as a digital download. Throughout 2006, it sold 1,657,798 digital copies. "SexyBack" was on the Hot 100 for thirty-six weeks. By 2018, the song has accumulated 6.1 million units in the US, combining sales (4.9 million copies sold) and equivalent streams.

In the United Kingdom, "SexyBack" debuted at number 13 on the UK Singles Chart based solely on download sales one week prior to its physical release, and ascended to the top of the chart the following week, becoming Timberlake's first UK number-one single. On the Australian ARIA Charts, "SexyBack" debuted at number one and spent two consecutive weeks at the top becoming Timberlake's second number one single there (after "Rock Your Body" reached the summit in 2003), and has been certified two-times Platinum by ARIA Charts. In Austria, the single peaked at number five, becoming his most successful single tied with his third released single "What Goes Around.../...Comes Around". It has also been certified three-times Platinum in Canada.

In Sweden, "SexyBack" peaked at number four, while in France it peaked at number eight becoming Timberlake's first top ten hit from the album, and would later score two more top ten singles with "My Love" and "What Goes Around.../...Comes Around". The song peaked at number one in Germany, Ireland, New Zealand and Norway, and at number two in Switzerland and Belgium.

== Music video ==
The music video for "SexyBack" was directed by Michael Haussman and features Spanish actress Elena Anaya. The video was filmed in June 2006. In discussion of the video filmed in Barcelona, Timberlake said: "Obviously we went for the architecture, the exteriors, the interiors — the vibe in Spain is different than anywhere else in the world. It's so cool to shoot there."

Timberlake decided to work with director Michael Haussman, following his work on Madonna's 1994 music video for "Take a Bow". "It's one of my favorite videos Madonna's ever done," Timberlake said. "Even today, I still remember the visuals, the images, how he captured her. A lot of times, Madonna seems like she's the person in control, and in that video, she seemed vulnerable. It was a cool thing to see." The video was first shown on MTV's Making the Video on July 25, 2006.

Timberlake and Anaya star as rival spies who become romantically entangled. The video starts off with a cable car looking over Barcelona, from the West looking East, then it switches to a luxurious-looking hotel in Plaça de Catalunya. It then cuts to Timberlake in a different room; then to a club scene and Timberlake in front of a white background.

== Legacy and accolades ==
The song's abrasive electro-funk came as such a shock to the system in the era of pitched-up soul samples and MOR pop-rock that you might not have been quite sure what to do with it immediately upon its July release. But the song shortly proved itself as something powerful enough to both define top 40 and also push it forward, while severing the final ties between Timberlake and his teen-pop past.

— Billboard staff's "The Greatest Pop Star By Year (1981–2019)"

"SexyBack" helped introduce EDM sounds to top 40 radio, as it brought together variations of electronic dance music with Timberlake's R&B sounds. VH1 listed it third on their list of the "100 Greatest Songs of the '00s," while the Los Angeles Times listed it as an honorable mention among "the most timeless tunes of the 2000s", with an editor stating it "sounded wholly unfamiliar and unique." Entertainment Weekly deemed it a "modern day classic." Complex staff acknowledged in 2013 that the song "arrived on the scene like a hurricane", adding that while it had been established that "the dude from 'N Sync" was "more than capable" when he first released solo material with Justified four years earlier, "SexyBack" put Timberlake in a position "where you were forced to take him seriously."

"SexyBack" won the People's Choice Award for Favorite R&B song at the 2007 awards ceremony. At the 49th Grammy Awards, "SexyBack" won a Grammy Award in the category of Best Dance Recording. At the 2007 MTV Video Music Awards, Timberlake won Male Artist of the Year for "SexyBack", "Let Me Talk To You / My Love", and "What Goes Around... Comes Around". It won Best R&B/Urban Dance Track and Best Pop Dance Track at the 2007 Winter Music Conference's International Dance Music Awards. Additionally, it won an ASCAP Pop Music Award in 2007 in the category Most Performed Songs. The song was featured in the video game Fortnite Festival.

== Live performances ==
Timberlake performed "SexyBack" and "My Love" as a medley for the opening of the 2006 MTV Video Music Awards and again for the MTV Europe Music Awards 2006, which he also hosted. In addition, he performed the song at the Victoria's Secret Fashion Show. On August 25, 2013, Timberlake performed "SexyBack" in a medley with other of his songs at the 2013 MTV Video Music Awards.

"SexyBack" was featured on FutureSex/LoveShow (2007), Legends of the Summer Stadium Tour with rapper Jay-Z (2013), The 20/20 Experience World Tour (2013–15), The Man of the Woods Tour (2018–19), and The Forget Tomorrow World Tour (2024–25).

In addition, it was featured on the set list for three editions of Rock in Rio in 2013, 2014, and 2017, and two editions of the iHeartRadio Music Festival in 2013 and 2018.

Timberlake performed a remixed version of "SexyBack" at Super Bowl LII (2018) and his NPR Tiny Desk Concert (2024).

== Cover versions ==
The indie rock band Rock Plaza Central gained attention for their radically different cover of "SexyBack", with brass-and-banjo roots-rock stylings. American rock band Poison released a cover of the song as a promotional single and a bonus track on the Wal-Mart version of their 2007 cover album Poison'd! British soul singer Corinne Bailey Rae recorded a jazz/swing version whilst appearing on BBC Radio 1's Live Lounge in 2007. American pop rock band Maroon 5 covered the beginning of the song as part of a medley during their 2012 Overexposed Tour. Cartoon stars Weebl and Bob covered the song with their version "Pastry" including the refrain "I'm bringing pastry back"

== Personnel ==
Credits are adapted from Sound on Sound and the liner notes of FutureSex/LoveSounds.

- Justin Timberlake – lead and backing vocals
- Timbaland – co-lead vocals, Ensoniq ASR-10 sampler
- Nate "Danja" Hills – Akai MPC3000 and Macintosh programming
- Bill Pettaway – electric guitar
- Darryl Pearson – bass guitar

== Charts ==
=== Weekly charts ===
Weekly chart performance for "SexyBack"
Chart (2006–2007)	Peak position
Australia (ARIA)	1
Australian Urban (ARIA)	3
Austria (Ö3 Austria Top 40)	5
Belgium (Ultratop 50 Flanders)	3
Belgium (Ultratop 50 Wallonia)	2
Canada (Nielsen SoundScan)	1
Canada CHR/Top 40 (Billboard)	1
Canada Hot AC (Billboard)	7
CIS Airplay (TopHit)	11
Croatia (HRT)	6
Czech Republic Airplay (ČNS IFPI)	12
Denmark (Tracklisten)	2
Europe (Eurochart Hot 100)	1
Finland (Suomen virallinen lista)	3
France (SNEP)	8
Germany (GfK)	1
Greece (IFPI)	7
Hungary (Single Top 40)	3
Hungary (Dance Top 40)	11
Ireland (IRMA)	1
Italy (FIMI)	3
Netherlands (Dutch Top 40)	5
Netherlands (Single Top 100)	7
New Zealand (Recorded Music NZ)	1
Norway (VG-lista)	1
Russia Airplay (TopHit)	21
Scottish Singles Sales (Official Charts)	1
Slovakia Airplay (ČNS IFPI)	4
Sweden (Sverigetopplistan)	4
Switzerland (Schweizer Hitparade)	2
UK Singles (Official Charts)	1
UK Airplay (Music Week)	5
UK Hip Hop/R&B (Official Charts)	1
US Billboard Hot 100	1
US Adult Pop Airplay (Billboard)	18
US Dance Club Songs (Billboard)	1
US Dance Singles Sales (Billboard)	4
US Dance Airplay (Billboard)	1
US Hot R&B/Hip-Hop Songs (Billboard)	11
US Pop Airplay (Billboard)	1
US Rhythmic Airplay (Billboard)	4

Chart (2013)	Peak position
UK Hip Hop/R&B (Official Charts)	35

=== Year-end charts ===
2006 year-end chart performance for "SexyBack"
Chart (2006)	Position
Australia (ARIA)	4
Australian Urban (ARIA)	40
Austria (Ö3 Austria Top 40)	46
Belgium (Ultratop Flanders)	34
Belgium (Ultratop Wallonia)	29
Brazil (Crowley)	18
CIS (TopHit)	76
European Hot 100 Singles (Billboard)	5
France (SNEP)	63
Germany (Media Control GfK)	21
Ireland (IRMA)	8
Italy (FIMI)	22
Netherlands (Dutch Top 40)	49
Netherlands (Single Top 100)	42
New Zealand (RIANZ)	9
Russia Airplay (TopHit)	134
Sweden (Hitlistan)	23
Switzerland (Schweizer Hitparade)	22
UK Singles (OCC)	10
UK Airplay (Music Week)	44
UK Urban (Music Week)	16
US Billboard Hot 100	9
US Dance Club Play (Billboard)	32
US Hot Dance Airplay (Billboard)	11
US Hot R&B/Hip-Hop Songs (Billboard)	100
US Mainstream Top 40 (Billboard)	6
US Rhythmic Airplay (Billboard)	30

2007 year-end chart performance for "SexyBack"
Chart (2007)	Position
Australia (ARIA)	66
US Billboard Hot 100	63

=== Decade-end charts ===
Decade-end chart performance for "SexyBack"
Chart (2000–2009)	Position
Australia (ARIA)	63
US Billboard Hot 100	60

== Certifications ==
Certifications and sales for "SexyBack"
Region	Certification	Certified units/sales
Australia (ARIA)	5× Platinum	350,000^{‡}
Canada (Music Canada)	3× Platinum	120,000^{*}
Denmark (IFPI Danmark)	Platinum	8,000^{^}
Germany (BVMI)	Platinum	300,000^{‡}
Italy (FIMI) (since 2009)	Gold	25,000^{‡}
New Zealand (RMNZ)	4× Platinum	120,000^{‡}
Spain (Promusicae)	Gold	30,000^{‡}
United Kingdom (BPI)	3× Platinum	1,800,000^{‡}
United States (RIAA)	Diamond	10,000,000^{‡}
Mastertone
Canada (Music Canada)	6× Platinum	240,000^{*}
United States (RIAA)	3× Platinum	3,000,000^{*}
^{*} Sales figures based on certification alone.^{^} Shipments figures based on certification alone.^{‡} Sales+streaming figures based on certification alone.

== Release history ==
Release dates and formats
Region	Date	Format	Label	Ref.
United States	July 18, 2006	Contemporary hit radio	Jive	
United States	July 18, 2006	Rhythmic radio	Jive	
Japan	August 23, 2006	CD single	Jive	
Germany	August 25, 2006	12-inch single	Jive	
France	August 26, 2006	Digital download	Jive	
United Kingdom	August 28, 2006	CD single	Jive	
United States	September 26, 2006	12-inch single	Jive	
United States	October 24, 2006	Digital download (SexyTracks: The SexyBack Remixes)	Jive	

== See also ==
- List of best-selling singles in the United States
- List of number-one singles of 2006 (Australia)
- List of European number-one hits of 2006
- List of number-one hits of 2006 (Germany)
- List of number-one singles of 2006 (Ireland)
- List of number-one singles from the 2000s (New Zealand)
- List of number-one songs in Norway
- List of number-one singles from the 2000s (UK)
- List of Billboard Hot 100 number-one singles of 2006
- List of Billboard number-one dance singles of 2006
