= Bobby Roache =

American male model and actor (born 1982)

Bobby Elliot Roache (born 1982) is an American male model and actor. Bobby established himself among the top most recognisable and in-demand models for his appearance role as Beyoncé's love interest in the #1 hit Irreplaceable.

== Biography ==
Bobby Roache was born in 1982, in Georgia. He and Art ala Carte both became known for their artistry displayed in YouTube videos. He was home-schooled his whole life. He began his channel with a video called “How to carve a relief style plaque” which was published in December 2011 and did not become an instant hit.

== Personal life ==
Bobby Roache was awarded most academic and best personality in his high school yearbook. In 2010, First Lady Michelle Obama was gifted print piece titled "Eyes On Music" a series of Roaché's art tribute for Duke Ellington School of the Arts. He launched his retail collection in Summer 2014. In his free time, he continues designing, drawing, painting, print-making, and sculpting pieces.

== Filmography ==
Film performances
Year	Title	Role	Notes
2006	Temporary Dreams	Raymond Edwards	Direct-to-video film
2007	The Brave One		
2007	American Gangster		
2008	Deception		
2011	Leave It On The Floor	Sex Siren	
2015	No More Mr. Nice Guy	Rodney	

Television performances
Year	Title	Role	Notes
2007	The Fashionista Diaries	Himself	
2011	Fashion Hunters	Himself	

Music videos
Year	Title	Artist	Notes
2006	"Irreplaceable"	Beyoncé	
2010	"Who Knew?"	Keke Wyatt	
2010	"Perfect Nightmare"	Shontelle	
