= Andre Birleanu =

Romanian model (born 1982)

- Born: August 7, 1982 (age 43); Bucharest, Romania
- Occupation: Model
- Years active: 1996–present
- Height: 1.79 m (5 ft 10 1/2 in)

Andre Birleanu (born August 7, 1982) is a Romanian model.

== Early life ==
Birleanu is the son of Vladimir Simonov, a Russian diplomat and international lawyer, and Carmen Bîrleanu, a Romanian diplomat. Birleanu was born in Moscow, but traveled extensively due to his father's work for the Soviet diplomatic service. In 1996, his mother was working for the United Nations in New York and invited her son to America to attend university. He attended John Jay Criminal Justice Academy, but stopped attending to pursue a career in modeling.

== Public image ==
MTV channel named Andre Birleanu "one of the hottest men on television" placing him on their top 10 list. ABC channel named Birleanu one of the top TV bad boys adding that "when Andre Birleanu graced our television sets, he brought sexy back with a villainous twist". He was named by People Magazine as one of the sexiest men while the American Broadcasting Company called him one of Top 10 TV Villains.

== See also ==
- List of male underwear models
