= Radoslav Vanko =

- Born: Radoslav Vanko; 1983 (age 42–43); Žilina, Slovakia
- Modelling information
- Height: 6 ft 1 in (1.85 m)
- Hair colour: Brown
- Eye colour: Brown
- Agency: Fashion Models, Milan

Radoslav Vanko (born in 1983, in Žilina, Slovakia), is a Slovak model. Vanko graduated from the faculty of physical education and sport with a master's degree as a teacher and personal trainer.

== Career ==
Vanko has modeled for Valentino, Dolce and Gabbana, Giorgio Armani, Gucci, Pierre Cardin, Louis Vuitton and Prada. He has appeared on the cover of Men's Health and DNA.
