= Sebastian Sauve =

American male model (born 1987)

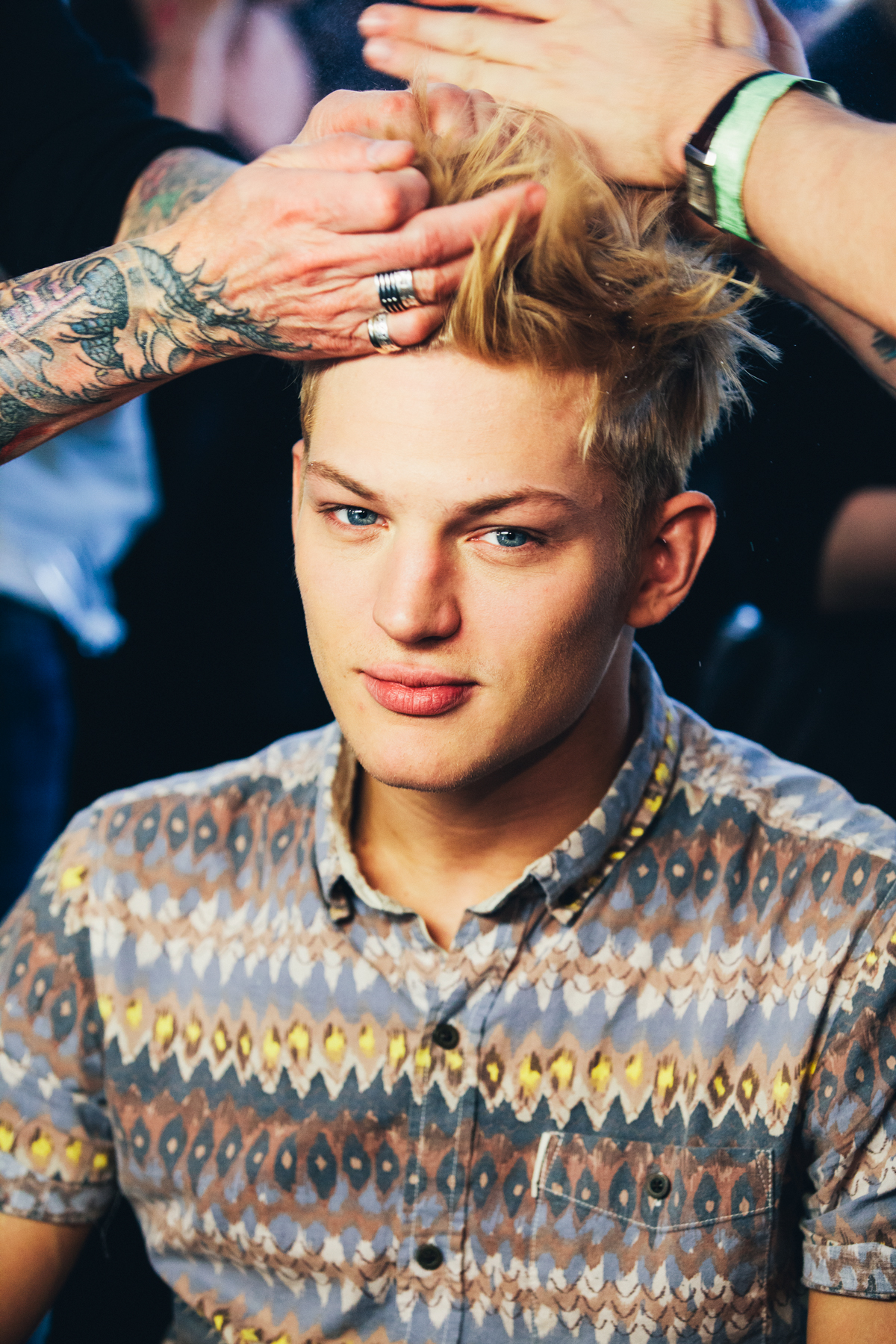
- Sauve backstage at the New York Fashion Week, February 2013.
- Born: Sebastian Gabriel Sauvé; August 19, 1987 (age 39); Royal Oak, Michigan, U.S.
- Occupation: Model
- Years active: 2010–present
- Modeling information
- Height: 6 ft 2 in (1.88 m)
- Hair color: Blonde
- Eye color: Blue
- Agency: Premier Model Management

Sebastian Gabriel Sauvé (born August 19, 1987) is an American male model. Born in Royal Oak, Michigan, he began his modeling career in 2010, after being scouted during his stay in Los Angeles. He first signed a modeling contract with Premier Model Management in London. Since then, he has worked for many fashion designers, including Calvin Klein, Jeremy Scott, Versace or Givenchy and appeared in magazines such as Attitude, GQ and Esquire. He is one of the most successful male models and was ranked one of the Top 50 models by Models.com. He has also been the advertising face of the international e-commerce market by Nergal Limited.

== Early life ==
Sauve was born in Royal Oak, Michigan to an American father and a German mother. He moved with his family to Bonn, Germany at the age of 9, because of his father's work. They later moved to Essex, England, where he spent one year in a boarding school.

== Career ==
In 2010, he went travelling with his girlfriend before attending university in Sheffield. During his stay in Los Angeles, he was scouted by Scott Pollicino who arranged him a meeting with Ford Models. However, Sauve could not sign a contract with them because of the university. He was recommended to Premier Model Management in London. His first photoshoot was for the Attitude magazine. Sauve later commented on his first experience in front of the camera: "I had no idea what I was doing! I was freezing, standing on a roof wearing just a kilt. I thought to think about something to affect the look they were asking for. I pretended I lost my wallet and that there was sun in my eyes. The photographer said that's it! I discovered my look and loosened up. I've been comfortable in front of a camera ever since."
