= Audio leveler =

An audio leveller is an audio signal processing system that maintains a consistent perceived loudness across different audio material. In modern practice, as described in the EBU R128 loudness standard, audio levelling is based on measuring programme loudness using psychoacoustic models rather than relying on peak amplitude.

Levelers work especially well with vocals, as there are huge dynamic differences in the human voice and levelers work in such a way as to sound very natural, letting the character of the sound change with the different levels but still maintaining a predictable and usable dynamic range.

A leveler is different from a compressor in that the ratio and threshold are controlled with a single control.

Levelers sometimes feature only an overall gain and peak level control (aka normalization control) on particular models to more accurately and subtly manage peak volume.
