= Tomas Skoloudik =

Czech model (born 1985)

- Born: Tomáš Školoudík; 24 October 1985 (age 40); Dobřany, Czechoslovakia
- Occupations: Model; Pornographic film actor
- Modelling information
- Height: 6 ft 1 in (1.85 m)
- Hair colour: Brown
- Eye colour: Green
- Agency: Fashion Models, Milan, New York, 101 Modeling

Tomas Skoloudik (Czech: Tomáš Školoudík; born 24 October 1985), is a Czech model and, as a pornographic film actor, better known by his stage name Tommy Wood.

== Career ==
Skoloudik started modeling when he was 19 years old. From 2008 onwards, he went on to become a sought-after model for print modeling. He appeared on magazine covers like Men's Health, Men's Folio, Style: Men, and Indigo. This is in addition to extensive appearances in print and television advertising in Asia in Tokyo, Hong Kong, Singapore, and Kuala Lumpur. His high fashion modeling print work includes ad campaigns for Armani Jeans and Emporio Armani, Buffalo, Gas Jeans, Calvin Klein, Guess Underwear, Free Soul, Kenneth Cole, and Dolce&Gabbana.

In 2019, he transitioned to the adult film industry as a pornographic actor under the alias "Tommy Wood". He's represented by 101 Modeling.

Prior to his modelling career, Skoloudik had actually appeared in at least one adult film before.
