= Sergey Boytsov =

Russian sportsman and actor (born 1994)

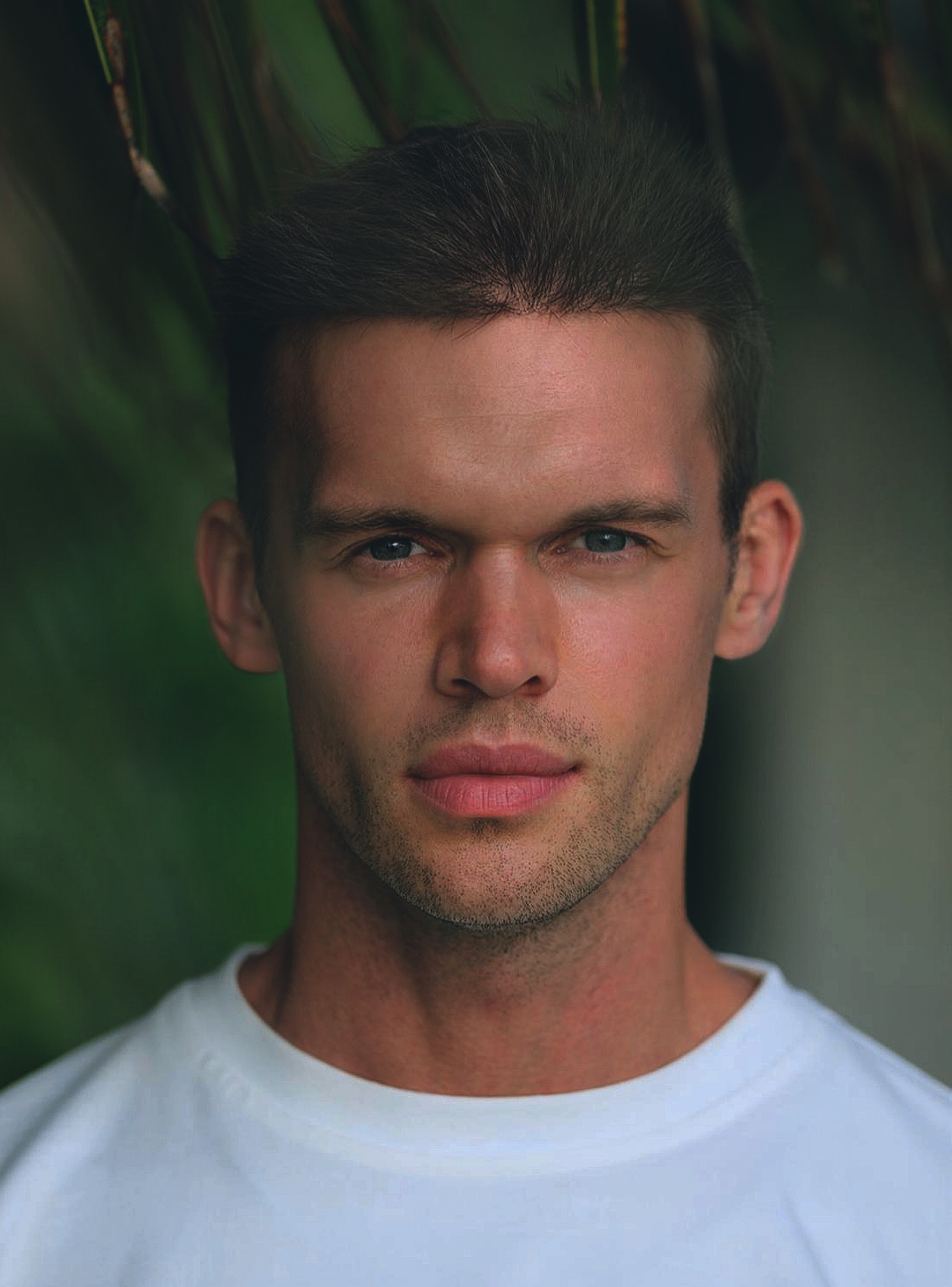
- Born: August 15, 1994 (age 32); Klin, Moscow Oblast, Russia
- Occupations: extremal, actor
- Years active: 2011–present
- Height: 185 cm (6 ft 1 in)
- Children: Boytsov Christian
- Parents: Sergey Viktorovich Seryogin (father); Evgeniya Yuryevna Rybakova (mother)
- Relatives: Viktoria Vasilyevna Boytsova (grandmother)
- Awards: Ministerial commendation Media Project of the Year (2025); Vertical–2025: film award Russian Olympic Committee honorary badge Russian Biathlon Union letter of appreciation Certificate of honour presented at the State Duma; Russian Ballooning Federation diploma
- Website: sergeyboytsov.com

Sergey Boytsov (Russian: Сергей Дмитриевич Бойцов; born 15 August 1994) is a Russian extreme athlete, BASE jumper and actor.

In 2023, he became the first person to make a parachute jump from Europe's tallest skyscraper, the Lakhta Centre. Boytsov gained recognition for the extreme aerial stunts he performed beneath hot air balloons.

On 23 September 2024, Boytsov organised and refereed what was described as the world's first boxing match held on the upper surface of a hot air balloon in free flight, in the Moscow Region. The event featured professional athletes and was noted by media outlets such as Forbes Russia as one of the most unusual combat sports venues in history.

On 12 March 2025, Boytsov and Guinness World Record holder Vladimir Murzaev played a table tennis match on a platform suspended beneath a hot air balloon at an altitude of 2,450 metres above sea level over the Azat Reservoir in Armenia.

On 5 June 2025, Boytsov performed giant swings on a horizontal bar suspended beneath a hot air balloon at an altitude of 1,500 metres, without any safety equipment or a parachute. The stunt was registered as a world record.

On 1 October 2025, Boytsov organised and conducted the first documented football match on a full-size platform suspended beneath a hot-air balloon in free flight.

Beyond sport, Boytsov is the founder of Created by the Heavens (Russian: Создан небесами), an organisation dedicated to large-scale aerial stunts and ballooning projects. In 2024, he introduced Russia's largest hot air balloon, decorated with a symbolic image of a boy watering flowers, combining references to The Little Prince, the anime character Naruto and himself.

Boytsov has also pursued acting, appearing in Russian films. In 2025, he featured in the monster action film Kraken.

His performances often involve suspended platforms, gymnastic equipment, or the upper surface of a balloon envelope in free flight.

== Biography ==
Boytsov was born in Klin, Moscow Oblast, Russia.

He was raised principally by his mother, Evgeniya Yuryevna Rybakova, and his grandmother, Viktoria Vasilyevna Boytsova, the latter of whom played a particularly important role in his upbringing and maintained a special bond with him throughout his childhood. His father, Sergey Viktorovich Seryogin, was largely absent during his early years.

He has a son, Christian (Бойцов Кристиан Сергеевич).

In his youth, Boytsov began his career as a fitness model, before shifting his focus towards extreme disciplines such as parachuting, aerial performance and experimental balloon-based stunts.

== Sky Football Match Record (2025) ==
On 1 October 2025, Sergei Boytsov organized and conducted the first documented football match on a full-size platform suspended beneath a hot-air balloon in free flight. The project demonstrated the feasibility of large external aerial platforms and became a verified record in aerial sports.

The project took one year to complete and involved a 16 × 10 m modular platform assembled and disassembled four times. Testing included one winch lift in a hangar, two tethered balloon flights, and one free-flight test with parachute deployment.

The full operational system: platform, players, technical equipment, balloon components and safety gear: weighed 2,517.6 kg. Aerodynamic drag during ascent reached 9.5 kN, temporarily increasing the load by about 950 kg.

More than 700 hours of assembly work were carried out, with 22 vehicles supporting the launch operations.

The final flight occurred in the Tula Region, Russia, piloted by Ivan Menyailo (Иван Меняйло). The platform carried Sergei Boytsov, athlete Mikhail Litvin and referee Viktor Chalov. The balloon reached 6,000 ft and remained airborne for 1.5 hours.

Twenty footballs were placed on the platform at takeoff; all were lost during the match.

The project became the first verified football match performed in free flight on a full-size aerial platform, involving 38 team members and multiple flight tests.

== High-altitude horizontal bar performance (2025) ==
Sergei Boytsov performed a gymnastic horizontal bar element on a suspended platform beneath a hot-air balloon at an altitude of approximately 1,500 meters. The performance involved a full gymnastic rotation ("giant swing") executed in free flight conditions without the use of a parachute or personal safety harness and became one of the most discussed elements among Boytsov's aerial projects.

The horizontal bar performance attracted significant media attention and generated public debate. Supporters described the act as a technically complex achievement in extreme sports, emphasizing the level of physical control, engineering preparation, and coordination required to execute a classical gymnastic element in an aerial environment.

At the same time, a number of sports commentators and safety specialists expressed concerns regarding the public demonstration of high-risk athletic actions. Critics argued that showcasing such elements without visible safety systems could be perceived as dangerous and potentially misleading for non-professional athletes, particularly when presented in mass media formats.

In response to the discussion, project representatives stated that the performance was conducted under controlled technical conditions, with prior engineering assessments and professional supervision. It was emphasized that the horizontal bar element was not intended for replication outside of specialized training and safety frameworks.

=== Covers ===
Year	Photographer	Country	Magazine
2015	Sergey Kalabushkin	Russia	Uamodel
2016	Luis Rafael	United States	2Bexposed
2016	David Vance	United States	Wiremag
2016	David Vance	United States	Adon
2017	Sergey Kalabushkin	Russia	Bloggmagazine
2018	David Vance	United States	2Bexposed
2018	Jorge Freire	United States	Wiremag
2025	Mikhail Peshkov	Russia	Men Today Magazine
2025	Mikhail Peshkov Igor Vaskov	Russia	Publimetro
2025	Sergei Shchelukhin	Russia	Hello!Russia Magazine

== Stratospheric parachute jump (2026) ==
On 22 August 2026, Boytsov made a parachute jump from a hot-air balloon at an altitude of 11,551 metres over Altai Krai, as part of the Stratum Jump 11–12 project. According to the organisers, the jump set a world record for a parachute jump from a hot-air balloon, surpassing the previous mark of 10,060 metres held by Polish parachutists.

The balloon was piloted by Ivan Menyailo and reached a maximum altitude of 11,610 metres. Altapress reported that Boytsov spent approximately two and a half minutes in free fall, reaching a speed of 501 km/h, before his parachute opened at 1,565 metres. The descent lasted seven minutes and nineteen seconds.

Preparation included a hypobaric chamber test at the Yuri Gagarin Cosmonaut Training Center, simulating an altitude of 12,000 metres, as well as cold-weather equipment testing and wind-tunnel training.

== Engineering collaboration and record-setting project ==
In 2025, Sergey Boytsov collaborated with the Russian engineering company Top Systems, developers of the T-FLEX PLM software suite, to design and calculate a special platform for a horizontal bar to be suspended beneath a hot air balloon. The project aimed to enable Boytsov to perform a full gymnastic rotation – the "giant swing" or sun – at an altitude of 1,500 meters without any safety equipment or parachute.

The engineering challenge was to create a lightweight yet durable structure capable of withstanding dynamic loads generated by Boytsov's movements in flight. The T-FLEX CAD and T-FLEX VR systems were used to design and virtually simulate the platform before construction. Stress and stability analyses were carried out using T-FLEX Analysis, allowing the engineering team to model real-world aerodynamic and structural conditions in a virtual environment.

The platform, measuring approximately 6×6 meters and weighing 600 kilograms, was built from reinforced aluminium profiles to ensure both strength and minimal weight. The design required non-standard cross-sections and additional internal bracing to prevent oscillations during the maneuver.

According to Top Systems engineer Nikita Ryabov, the project required precise structural verification because "the cost of an error was a human life.”

The successful completion of the stunt marked the first-ever gymnastic rotation performed on a horizontal bar suspended under a balloon in free flight. The feat was officially recognized as a world record and highlighted the intersection of aerosport engineering and human endurance.

== Recognition ==
The world's first boxing match held on the upper surface of a hot air balloon in free flight was noted by media outlets such as Forbes Russia as one of the most unusual combat sports venues in history.

On 12 March 2025, above the Azat Reservoir in Armenia, Boytsov, alongside Guinness World Record holder Vladimir Murzaev (highlining), played a table tennis match on a platform suspended beneath a hot air balloon at 2,450 meters above sea level

On 5 June 2025, in the Moscow Region, Boytsov performed giant swings on a horizontal bar suspended beneath a hot air balloon at 1,500 meters, it was recognized as a world record by Russian and international organizations.

On 1 October 2025, Sergei Boytsov conducted the first documented football match on a full-size platform suspended beneath a hot-air balloon in free flight. The project demonstrated the feasibility of large external aerial platforms and became a verified record in aerial sports.The video of the high-altitude football game has gone viral, amassing over 50 million views so far.

== Awards and achievements ==
=== Ministerial commendation ===
Boytsov received an official commendation from the Minister of Sport of the Russian Federation. The award was presented by the Minister of Sport and President of the Russian Olympic Committee, Mikhail Degtyarev, in recognition of Boytsov's contribution to extreme sports and aerial disciplines, including the realisation of large-scale projects at the intersection of sport, aviation and engineering, as well as his multiple world records and the high-profile international media coverage they attracted.

=== “Media Project of the Year” award (2025) ===
In 2025, Boytsov was awarded Media Project of the Year by the Russian Parachuting Federation. The award, introduced for the first time that year, recognised projects that contribute to the public visibility and development of parachuting beyond the professional sports community. Boytsov received the award for the project Created by the Heavens (Sozdan Nebesami), which combined parachuting, aerial engineering and media formats, and debuted with world-record performances.

Following the award ceremony, a cooperation agreement was signed between Sozdan Nebesami LLC, represented by Boytsov, and the Russian Parachuting Federation, aimed at the joint development and promotion of parachuting.

=== Film awards ===
In December 2025, the documentary film Boxing Match on the Upper Surface of a Hot Air Balloon, directed by Sergei Boytsov, won the Extreme and Sports category at the 28th Moscow International Film Festival "Vertical–2025".

=== Other commendations ===
On 9 July 2025, Boytsov was presented with a diploma for outstanding achievements in ballooning by Ivan Menyailo, president of the Russian Ballooning Federation, at the federation's Moscow office. The diploma recognised his organisation of a boxing match on the upper surface of a hot-air balloon.

Boytsov received an honorary badge from the Russian Olympic Committee, presented by Mikhail Degtyarev, for the Air Olympics project.

On 11 March 2026, Russian Biathlon Union president Viktor Maygurov presented Boytsov with a letter of appreciation for organising the Air Olympics project and promoting biathlon.

Boytsov also received a certificate of honour for his contribution to physical culture and sport in the Russian Federation, presented by Oleg Matytsin, chairman of the State Duma committee on physical culture and sport.

== Personal life ==
In 2019, Boytsov married Viktoria Demidova, a businesswoman and the founder of a fitness app for smartphones. That same year, they had a son, Christian (Бойцов Кристиан Сергеевич). The couple divorced in 2021, and Boytsov subsequently began a relationship with the blogger Anastasia Sozonik.

Boytsov has stated that he grew up without the presence of his father. In 2024, at the presentation of the balloon Created by the Heavens, both of his parents appeared together in public for the first time in thirty years. Boytsov described the occasion as their "first shared celebration".
