= QCP (internet personality) =

American chef

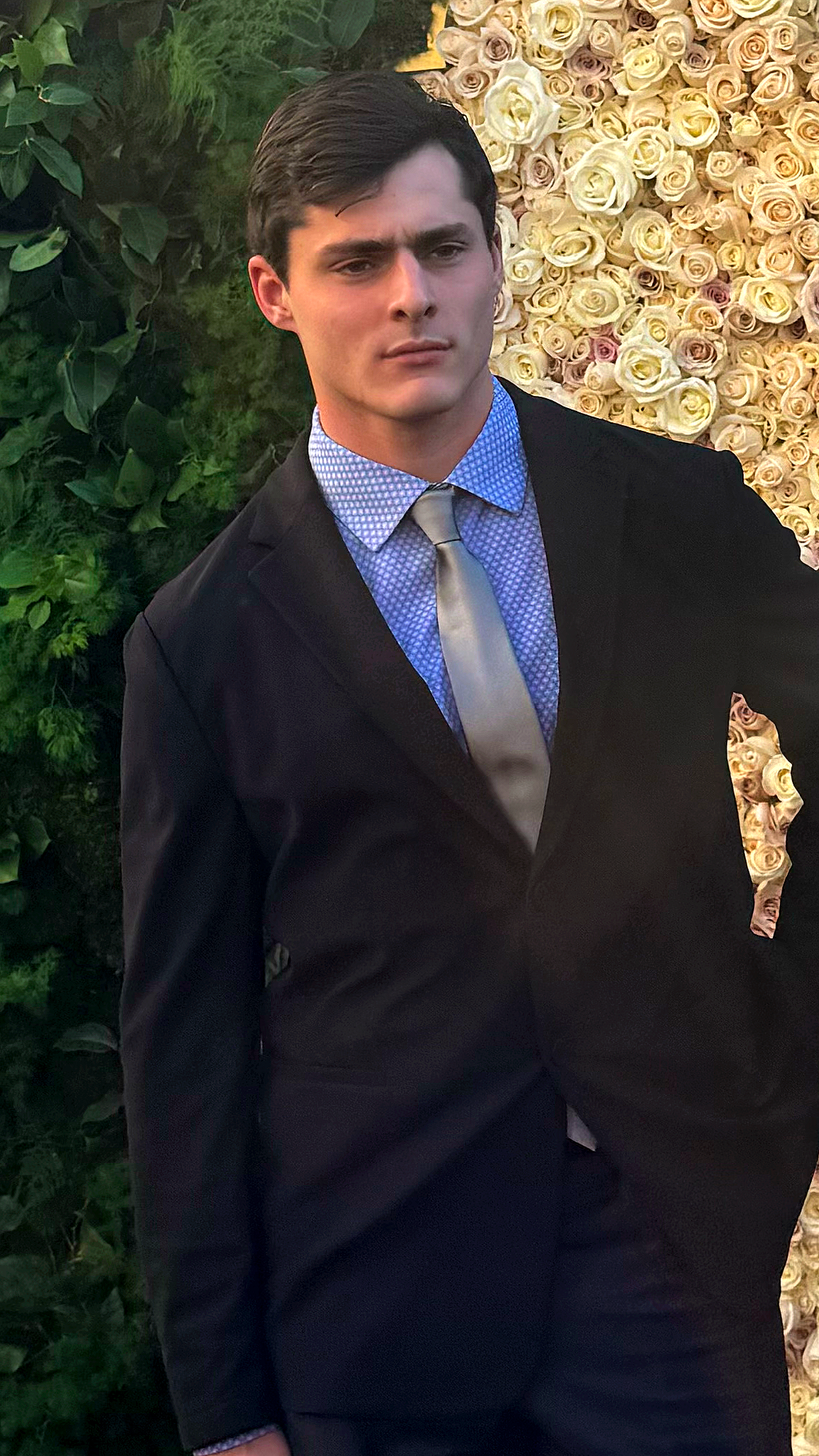
- QCP at the Golden Globe Awards 2025
- Born: Gianluca Conte; January 11, 2000 (age 26); Charlotte, North Carolina, U.S.
- Occupations: Chef; online personality; author
- Years active: 2017 – present

TikTok information
- Page: QCP
- Followers: 13.2 million

YouTube information
- Channel: QCP
- Years active: 2020–present
- Genres: vlog; comedy
- Subscribers: 8.97 million
- Views: 6.15 billion
- Last updated: February 19, 2026
- Website: theitalianhand.com

Gianluca Conte (born January 11, 2000), also known by his online alias QCP, is an American chef, social media personality and cookbook author. He is best known for his TikTok and YouTube videos where he makes, samples, and comments on traditional Italian and American Italian recipes, amassing over 25 million followers across social platforms, as at 2025. Conte has been featured in The New York Times, PAPER Magazine, Numéro, Dexerto, Leggo Italia, TMZ, amongst others.

== Early life and background ==
Conte was born in Charlotte, North Carolina, into a family of two sisters; to Italian and American parents. His mother is from Brooklyn, New York, and his father, from Ischia in Naples, Italy. He grew up cooking, influenced by his father's chain of Italian restaurants based in Charlotte. He enrolled in University of North Carolina.

== Career ==
QCP began posting on TikTok in 2019. His first video followed a viral trend, but his first cooking video, released shortly after, went viral. He later created a cooking series called The Angry New Jersey Cooking Show.

By 2025, QCP had over 13 million followers on TikTok, more than 8 million YouTube subscribers, and a large following on Instagram and Facebook. He has collaborated with public figures, including Will Smith, Paris Hilton, Shania Twain, and YouTuber MrBeast. He was referred to as "The Pasta King" by Paper Magazine.

He was named an ambassador for Italy's top football league, Serie A, and an influencer for Italian football club Inter Milan and Italian brand Pirelli.

He is the author of the book Italian/American: It’s a QCP Cookbook, Betch! which he released in April 2024. The book features a mix of traditional Italian, Italian-American, and draws from his family's culinary recipes. It was published by DK Publishing, an imprint of Penguin Random House.

He reviews restaurants and has reviewed Nobu and Hell's Kitchen. He has modeled for Alexander Wang.

Conte has been featured by outlets including The New York Times, Numéro, Distractify, Fox 5 New York, TMZ and Dexerto. He has also been featured by other outlets including AdWeek, Penguin Books, InsideHook.

== Personal life ==
His name QCP stands for Queen City Prince, referencing his Charlotte, North Carolina roots.

== Bibliography ==
- Italian/American: It’s a QCP Cookbook, Betch! DK Publishing (Penguin Random House), 2024. ISBN 9780744088397.
