= Gregg Avedon =

American model (born c. 1964)

- Born: Gregory Avedon c. 1964; Miami, Florida, U.S.
- Occupation(s): Model, fitness personality
- Website: www.avedonessentials.com

Gregory Avedon (born c. 1964) is a former model and fitness personality.

Avedon modelled for Giorgio Armani, Dolce & Gabbana, Krizia, Trussardi and Valentino Garavani. He appeared in several magazines and catalogs, including 18 times on the cover of Men's Health.

== Filmography ==
| Year | Title | Role | Notes |
|---|---|---|---|
| 2004 | Recipe for Grieving | Marshall | |
| 2004 | The 17th Man | 17th Man | |
| 2005 | Complete Guide to Guys | Man Husband | |
| 2009 | Burn Notice | Eric | |

== Works ==
- Avedon, Gregg (2008). Men's Health Muscle Chow: More Than 150 Meals to Feed Your Muscles and Fuel Your Workout. Emmaus, Pennsylvania: Rodale. ISBN 9781594865480. OCLC 187294480.
