= Ark Evelyn Grace Academy =

Coordinates: 51°27′38″N 0°06′15″W

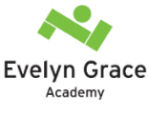

Location
- Shakespeare Road; London, SE24 0QN; England

Information
- Type: Academy
- Motto: Empowering our students to be the voice of their future
- Established: September 2008; 18 years ago
- Local authority: Lambeth
- Department for Education URN: 135389 Tables
- Ofsted: Reports
- Chair of Governors: Nilesh Goswami
- Principal: Una Sookun
- Gender: Mixed
- Age: 11 to 16
- Colours: Green, black
- Website: evelyngraceacademy.org

Ark Evelyn Grace Academy is a non-selective, coeducational secondary school in Brixton, in the London borough of Lambeth.

The Academy is a member of Ark, a multi-academy trust with schools across England.

The Academy opened in September 2008 in temporary accommodation admitting its first 180 pupils in year 7. In September 2010 the academy moved to a new purpose-built school building as it admitted its third year 7 year group. The building, designed by architect Zaha Hadid, was awarded the 2011 Stirling Prize.

== Building ==
The school, which won the Stirling Prize in 2011, was designed by renowned architect Zaha Hadid, who described her post-modernist style as parametricism.

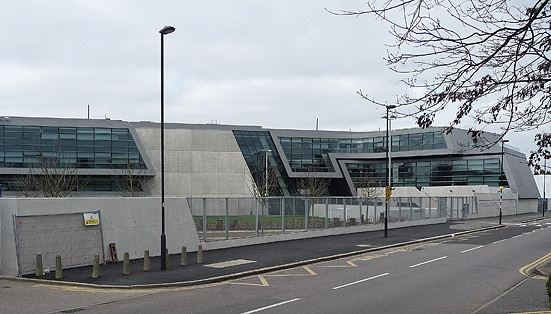
Ark Evelyn Grace Academy

The main building, which is a sweeping Z shape, has three floors of classroom placed on top of solid concrete podium. The building accommodates two "houses", which they call schools, separated by a range of shared facilities. The rest of the site is taken up by a gym, an art block, a series of all-weather pitches, and a 100 meter running track. Pupils do not have access to these areas outside lessons. The 60m^{2} classrooms are joined by twisting corridors. Though these floors feature glazed exteriors, the light reaching the classroom is limited and lights are needed throughout the day. The exterior wall finish are notable by their absence; classroom walls are either rendered white or remain as unfinished concrete. Windows are centrally controlled and some rooms do not have any.

The reverse of the B£5 Brixton Pound note was inspired by Ark Evelyn Grace Academy and features the Brixton Rec logo; the front features NBA basketball player Luol Deng.

== Educational philosophy ==
The school's philosophy draws upon that of the U.S. charter school movement—specifically, its belief in the "small school model...which has an emphasis on academic rigour, discipline and strong relationships with caring adults". In addition to academics, EGA students are expected to meet the school's behavioural standards as well. The planned intake by London standards is tiny; each of the two houses, "Evelyn" and "Grace", could accommodate 270 pupils (one form entry). By 2017 it was educating 848 pupils and Ofsted had given it a "good" rating.

In 2010, the school's first principal Peter Walker said: “We have to establish the ’small school’ model first, so the teachers get to know all their students and form personal relationships. Some people think we are too strict here, but you must understand that self-discipline is one of our core values”. Ofsted, however, disagreed, and in 2011 they criticised the school saying that children were too tightly governed and were given implausible targets. Walker refused to accept the judgement, suspecting racist motives, or "at least a lack of professionalism".

Between 2012 and 2014 changes were made by the incoming principal Devon Hanson, who moved from Jamaica to Peckham at ten years old, who took a more community approach. After school he patrols the local streets encouraging youngsters to move away from potential areas of trouble. He observed that the local students would work hard but at the first sign of rejection or failure they would stop trying; he saw they needed to be taught "resilience".

== Funding ==
Ark Evelyn Grace Academy is an academy established under the Learning and Skills Act 2000. Academies are funded by the Department for Education and maintained by the government but they are independent and self-governing charitable trusts. Their construction also tend to be sponsored by businesses or benefactors; Ark Evelyn Grace Academy is supported by ARK (Absolute Return for Kids), an educational nonprofit founded by three hedge fund financiers, Arpad "Arki" Busson, Paul Marshall, and Ian Wace. Another hedge-fund manager, David Gorton, contributed £2 million of his own money towards the £38 million cost of building the school; he said he chose Zaha Hadid as its architect because he wanted a "stunning visual statement".
