= Elliott School, Putney =

Elliott School

Location
- Pullman Gardens; Putney Heath, Putney; London, SW15 3DG; England; 51.4548°N 0.2259°W

Information
- Type: Comprehensive school
- Established: 1904
- Closed: 2012
- Department for Education URN: 101060 Tables

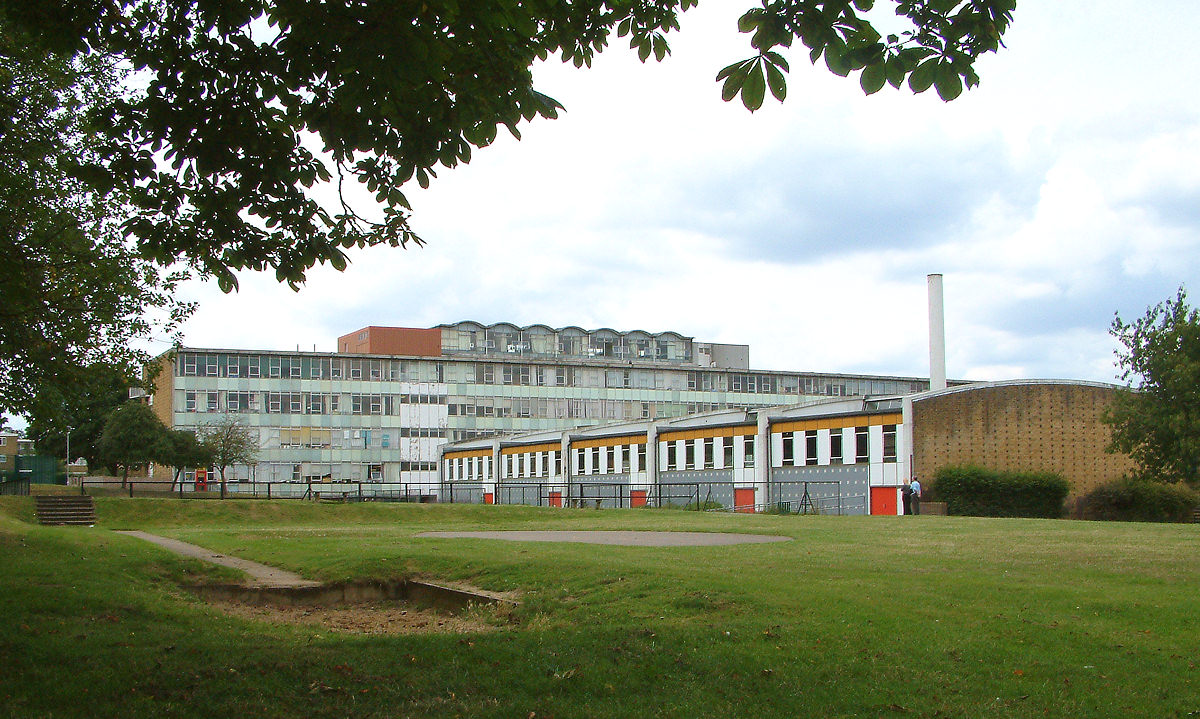
The school buildings in 2004

Elliott School was a school in Putney, England, founded in 1904, which became the Ark Putney Academy in 2012.

== History ==
Elliott School was a co-educational foundation school and sixth form college in Pullman Gardens, Putney, in the London Borough of Wandsworth. It had Language College specialist status through which it gained a European Award for Languages in 2004, the International School Award from the British Council and an Artsmark Award which reflected the school's strong tradition in the visual and performing arts. The school had a purpose-built theatre (proscenium type) as well as art studios and design technology workshops. The school's assembly hall was the location for the Christmas pageant in Richard Curtis' 2003 film Love Actually where Hugh Grant, Emma Thompson and other stars visited for the movie. One of its former pupils was actor Pierce Brosnan.

There had been a number of locations for the Elliott School. It was initially known as Southfields School when it first opened in temporary buildings at Merton Road in Southfields in 1904. The school was given central school status in 1910 before changing its name to Elliott School in 1911 after Sir Charles Elliott, a governor and the first Chairman of Managers, the school's elephant badge reflecting his service in India. The school's leaving age was raised to 14 in 1918, and the Elliott (Mixed) School was reorganised into separate Boys’ and Girls’ Schools in 1925.

During World War Two, the two schools were evacuated to different locations in 1939. An Emergency School opened in Merton Road in 1940, which merged with the two Elliott Schools in 1945 when they returned to Merton Road at the end of the war.

In 1956 the two Elliott Schools and Huntingfield Secondary Modern School, amalgamated on a new site in Pullman Gardens, to become Elliott Comprehensive School, officially opened in 1957 by Hugh Gaitskell. The first Head of the new school was Maurice Holmes (1956–1967). He was succeeded by Tom Davies (1968–1974), Guardino Rospigliosi (1974–1982), Victor Burgess (1982–2002), Tony Willis (2002–2004), Sharon Ferrell (2005–2009) and Margaret Peacock (2009–2010).

After 1956 Elliott evolved from 'Flagship Comprehensive' to Language College and survived as a Mixed Comprehensive while local Mayfield Girls' and Wandsworth Boys' closed. In 1992, Elliott School, Pullman Gardens, was made a Grade II Listed Building and given Grant Maintained Status and in 1999 this was replaced by Foundation School Status.

In the 2003 New Year Honours, former headmaster Victor Burgess was awarded the OBE for services to education.

In October 1994 Ofsted reported that "This is a good school with outstanding features".

In October 1998 Ofsted declared that "Elliott is an outstandingly well led and managed school".

In March 2009, despite the sixth form provision being praised as "Good", an Ofsted inspection judged the main school provision "Inadequate". The school was criticised for inadequate resources to facilitate effective teaching. The school was placed on 'Special measures' and its board of governors replaced with an interim executive board. Mrs Margaret Peacock, Head of Chestnut Grove School in Balham, assumed the role of interim Headteacher in June 2009 before handing over the reins to Mark Phillips (formerly head of de Stafford School in Caterham, Surrey) in April 2010.

Under Phillips, after a successful Ofsted inspection in November 2010, the school was removed from the "Special Measures" category and in the Summer of 2012, following record high exam results, the school relaunched as the ARK Putney Academy looking to consolidate further progress with the quality of its provision under the umbrella of the Absolute Return for Kids ARK organisation.

The main part of Elliott School was a Grade II listed building designed in the early 1950s by G. A. Trevett of the London County Council architects' department. It was among the early work of John Bancroft who worked as an assistant on the project. English Heritage described it as "perhaps the finest of the large comprehensive schools built by the London County Council architects". In 2012 Wandsworth Council decided that much of the new ARK Putney Academy's open space would be sold for housing development to pay for a major refurbishment of the main school buildings. The decision received formal planning permission in October 2013, with the refurbishment taking place the following year.

== Notable former pupils ==
- Joseph Coelho, poet and writer
- Joe Armstrong 1990-1997 – actor
- Geoff Arnold 1955–1959? – England bowler
- William Bevan 1990–1995 – musician (see 'Burial', below)
- Pierce Brosnan 1964–1969 – actor
- Damien Francis 1992–1996 – professional footballer
- Peter Green 1958–1962 – musician
- Brian Gwaspari 1961–1966 – actor
- John Hamill 1958–1962 – actor
- Kieran Hebden 1989–1994? – musician (See 'Four Tet', below)
- Christian Hyslop 1983–1988 – professional footballer
- Adem Ilhan 1994–1997? – musician
- Joseph Joyce 1996–2004 – super heavyweight boxer (Commonwealth Games Gold Medal 2014)
- Mawuli Kulego 1997–2004 – musician
- Herman Li 1986–1992 – guitarist with DragonForce
- Gary McDonald 1973–1978 – actor, composer
- Max Middleton 1958–1963 – musician and composer
- Matt Monro 1942–1944? – musician and singer
- Delyth Morgan, Baroness Morgan of Drefelin 1974–1979 – former MP, now Baroness
- Martin Newell 1967–1968 – musician, poet, writer and broadcaster
- Perry Nove – Commissioner of the City of London Police
- John Nunn 1965–1970? – Chess Grand Master
- Chai Patel 1968–1974? – Mental Health and Education Services
- Colin Petersen 1957–58 – actor and musician
- Maxwell Reed Pre 1938 – actor
- Gabriel Thomson 1998–2005 – actor

Bands/musicians

- Tommy Asher Danvers (TommyD) 1976–1982 – music producer
- Christopher John Millar (Rat Scabies) 1967–1973 – drummer with The Damned
- Burial – Electronic musician
- Four Tet – Experimental musician
- Fridge – Post rock band
- Hot Chip – Electropop band members
- The Maccabees – band members
- The xx – Dream pop entire band
- Xan Tyler – pop singer
