= Lily Aldridge =

American model

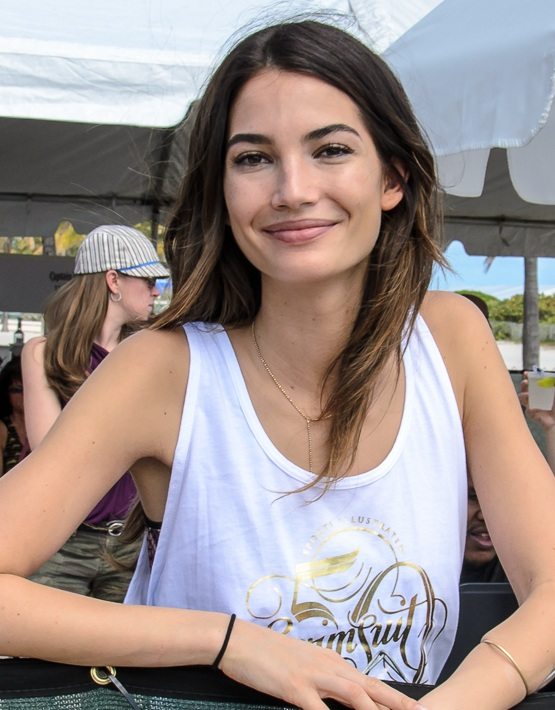
- Aldridge in 2014
- Born: Lily Maud Aldridge; November 15, 1985 (age 40); Santa Monica, California, U.S.
- Occupation: Model
- Years active: 2001–present
- Spouse: Caleb Followill (m. 2011)
- Children: 2
- Parents: Alan Aldridge (father); Laura Lyons (mother)
- Relatives: Ruby Aldridge (sister); Miles Aldridge (half-brother); Saffron Aldridge (half-sister)
- Modeling information
- Height: 5 ft 9 in (1.75 m)
- Hair color: Brown
- Eye color: Brown
- Agency: IMG Models (Worldwide); Stockholmsgruppen (Stockholm)

Lily Maud Aldridge (born November 15, 1985) is an American model. She was a Victoria's Secret Angel from 2010 to 2018. She also appeared in the Sports Illustrated Swimsuit Issue, alongside Chrissy Teigen and Nina Agdal, for the 50th anniversary cover in 2014.

== Early life ==
Aldridge was born at Saint John's Hospital in Santa Monica, California. She went to Franklin Elementary School in Santa Monica. She is the daughter of British artist Alan Aldridge and American Playboy Playmate of the month Laura Lyons. Aldridge attended high school in London, as well as Notre Dame High School in Sherman Oaks, California.

== Career ==
External image
- Aldridge's Sports Illustrated Swimsuit Issue cover from 2014

=== Print work ===
Aldridge started modeling at the age of 16, for Abercrombie & Fitch. Her advertising campaigns included Rocawear, Arden B., Rag & Bone, Shiatzy Chen, Bobbi Brown, Smashbox Cosmetics, GAP, Tommy Hilfiger, Coach, JCrew, Charles David, Levi's, J Brand, Accessorize.

She was also featured in the spring 2011 advertising campaign for clothing company Rag & Bone, and served as a photographer for the same campaign in the following season.

She was named the face of clothing company XOXO and the skincare company Proactiv in 2014. With Chanel Iman, she was the face of the Born Free Africa campaign for online retailer Shopbop.

=== Magazines ===
Aldridge's first major magazine cover was the August 2003 issue of Spanish Vogue. She has since appeared on the covers of French Glamour, Vogue Mexico, Elle Korea, Elle Brazil, Elle Vietnam, Tatler, 10 magazine, S Moda, Esquire Mexico, Allure Russia and Net-a-Porter's online magazine, The Edit.

She has appeared in editorials for American, French, British, Spanish, German, and Mexican Vogue, American, Australian, and Korean Elle, Harper's Bazaar, LOVE, W, V, Glamour, and Marie Claire.

Aldridge made her Sports Illustrated Swimsuit Issue debut in 2014, as a covermodel alongside Chrissy Teigen and Nina Agdal for the issue's 50th anniversary.

=== Velvet Tees ===
She has been the face of fashion label Velvet Tees since 2004. In 2013, Aldridge released her own clothing line with Velvet Tees called Lily Aldridge for Velvet.

=== Victoria's Secret ===
Aldridge made her Victoria's Secret Fashion Show debut in 2009. She became a Victoria's Secret Angel in 2010 was given wings for the first time during that year's show. She continued to appear in the annual Victoria's Secret Fashion Show until stepping away in 2018.

On November 2, 2015, Victoria's Secret announced that Aldridge would have the honor of wearing that year's Fantasy Bra during its fashion show, joining the ranks of models such as Tyra Banks, Heidi Klum, Alessandra Ambrosio and Adriana Lima. The bra, created by jeweler Mouawad, has an estimated value of $2 million and features more than 6,500 precious gems. She unveiled the bra in a video for Vogue.

Her time as an Angel included multiple magazine appearances. She appeared on the February 2011 cover of British GQ alongside fellow Angels Lindsay Ellingson, Erin Heatherton, and Candice Swanepoel for its annual Victoria's Secret Collector's Issue. Aldridge, Heatherton and Swanepoel also appeared in an editorial for V Magazine that month. In October 2014, Aldridge appeared in British Vogue with fellow Victoria's Secret Angels Adriana Lima, Candice Swanepoel, Lais Ribeiro and Elsa Hosk.

=== Music videos ===
Aldridge had a brief appearance alongside Eminem, Snoop Dogg, Dr. Dre and others in Limp Bizkit's 2000 music video for "Break Stuff". In 2015 she appeared in Taylor Swift's video for "Bad Blood", portraying an assassin named Frostbyte. Aldridge has also appeared in two Kings of Leon videos: "Use Somebody" and "Temple".

=== Television ===
Aldridge appeared on the TV series "Love Advent", 2 Broke Girls with Martha Hunt in episode "And the Model Apartment", and the film Ocean's 8 (2018). She also appeared in an episode of Top Chef with her husband Caleb Followill.

=== Other ===
Aldridge launched her eponymous fragrance line, Lily Aldridge Parfums, in the fall of 2019. The line's first fragrance, Haven, is described as a "romantic floral scent, with rich rose, fresh peony and a note of deep musk." The second scent, Summit, is described as a "warm, aromatic scent, with sweet tobacco, rich leather, spices and woods." She said the line was developed with sustainability in mind; the bottles feature bottle caps made with responsibly harvested wood and recycled-paper boxes that double as shipping cartons.

She has a personal YouTube channel, which launched in August 2019.

== Personal life ==
Aldridge met Kings of Leon frontman Caleb Followill at Coachella in 2007. They married on May 12, 2011, at the San Ysidro Ranch in Montecito, California. They have a daughter (b. 2012) and a son (b. 2019).
