= Ken White =

English artist (1943–2025)

- Born: 23 March 1943; Swindon, Wiltshire, England
- Died: 24 December 2025 (aged 82); Swindon, Wiltshire, England
- Education: Swindon College
- Occupations: Muralist, painter, illustrator
- Website: www.kenwhitemurals.co.uk

Kenneth White (23 March 1943 – 24 December 2025) was an English muralist, painter and illustrator, known for his work with the band XTC and for the airline Virgin Atlantic, as well as murals in his home town of Swindon and elsewhere. After attending Swindon Art School, White created over a hundred murals for various clients in the United Kingdom.

== Early life ==
White was born on 23 March 1943 in Swindon, Wiltshire, growing up on Mulberry Grove (Note: Mulberry Grove: 51.580818°N 1.797227°W) in the town. His father, George Albert White, was a former PT instructor with the RAF, holding the rank of flight sergeant, and a worker, like his own father, at Swindon Railway Works. White's mother was also the child of a local railwayman.

White's first job after school, at 15, was as a "rivet hotter" in the railway works, but he soon gave that up by transferring to the signwriting department there. From 1962, he attended Swindon Art School, on a four-year pre-diploma course, against his parents' wishes. His fellow students included Rick Davies, later of Supertramp, and Gilbert O'Sullivan, who had success as a solo singer-songwriter.

== Career ==
White's Golden Lion Bridge mural in its original form, but faded, in 2008 (White repainted it with modifications in 2009)

After college, White moved to London to take up a post with the British Council, designing exhibitions, but returned to Swindon in 1978 to raise a family.

His nude painting of The Beatles was used in Alan Aldridge's 1969 book The Beatles Illustrated. He painted artist portraits for covers of Cream magazine, including Alice Cooper (April 1973 issue) and David Bowie (May 1973).

White's first mural was Golden Lion Bridge on Fleming Way, Swindon (Note: The Golden Lion Bridge mural is on the side of a house whose address is 6, Medgbury Road, Swindon SN1 2AS; at 51.562844°N 1.779865°W), in 1976, undertaken a part of a job creation scheme. Its use in a 1977 advertising campaign by Bayer led to further commissions.

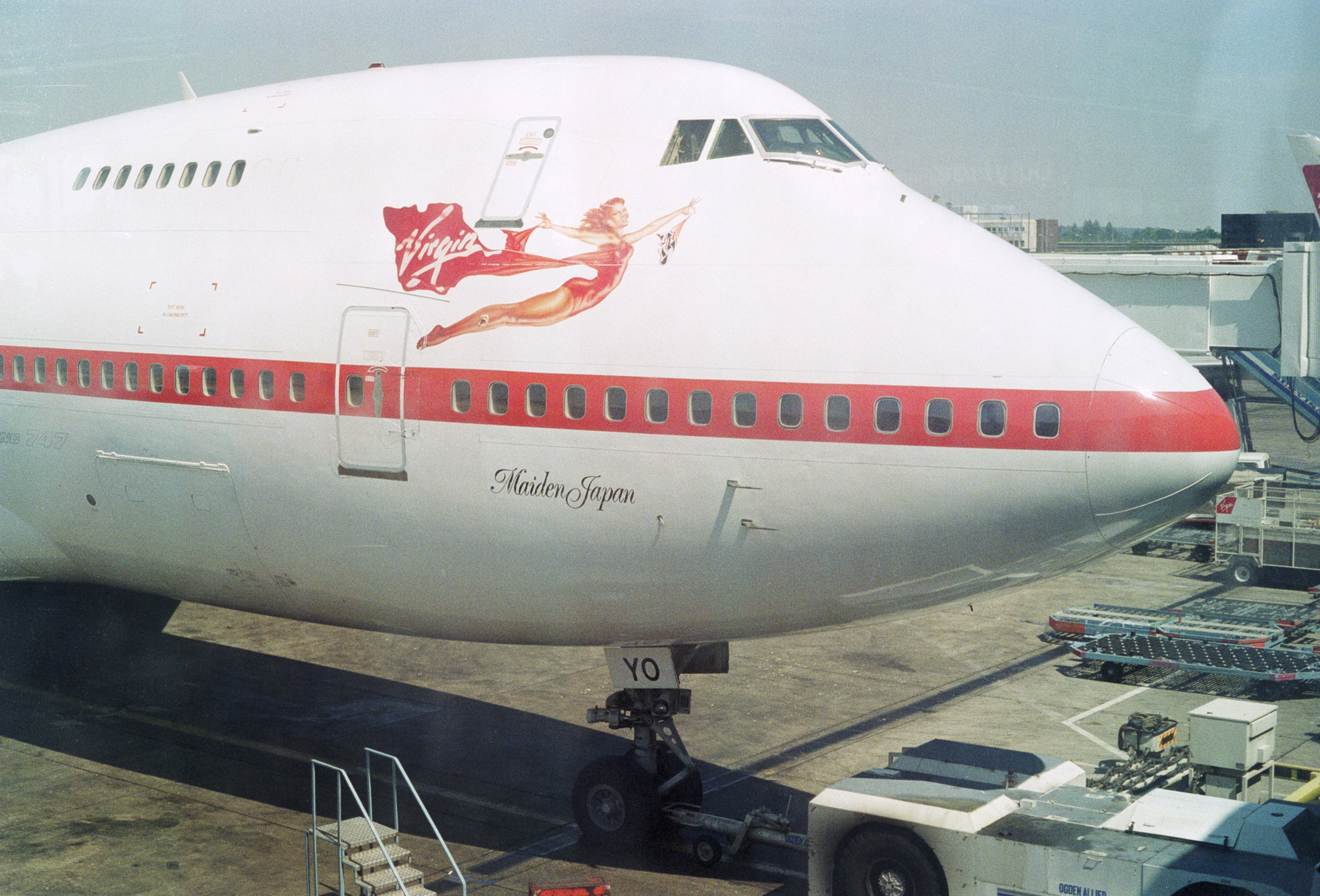
White's "Scarlet Lady" logo on a Virgin Atlantic Airways' Boeing 747, Maiden Japan, painted by White in 1989 and seen in August 1990

In 1978, White painted trompe-l'œil murals covering the exterior of Richard Branson's Town House recording studio, and then for two decades, worked for Branson's Virgin companies, including the music label Virgin Records, record shops, hotels, and the Virgin Atlantic airline, on a retainer giving them first call on his services. For the label, he painted murals advertising releases including the Sex Pistols' The Great Rock 'n' Roll Swindle and Mike Oldfield's Incantations. He painted murals in record shops and company offices, at The Manor Studio and on The Manor Mobile, and at Virgin-affiliated Le Petit Blanc restaurants. He was commissioned to create the painting that forms the backdrop for the album art on XTC's 1980 album Black Sea. He designed the "Scarlet Lady" logo for Virgin Atlantic in 1984, after pinups by Alberto Vargas. Early versions were painted by White, directly onto each aircraft, using a spraygun and airbrush.

White's 1979 mural Swindon Personalities in Prospect Place, Old Town, Swindon, featured well-known people from the town, including Rick Davies, Diana Dors, Justin Hayward, Gilbert O'Sullivan and members of XTC.

In 1982 he painted a mural on the side of the Royal Opera House on a commission from Jacob Rothschild. White painted more than a hundred murals in all; at least ten of them in Swindon. He repainted Golden Lion Bridge in 2009; as of 2019, it is the only one of the murals in his home town to survive.

=== Recognition ===
In 2013 a retrospective exhibition of White's work was held at the Post Modern Art Gallery in Swindon, and another, Ken White: Railways and Landscapes, at Swindon Museum & Art Gallery in 2019.

A number of his works are in the collection of Swindon Museum & Art Gallery, with posters and printed material in Wiltshire and Swindon History Centre. His painting Lunch Time, depicting rivet hotters on a work break, is owned by Swindon's STEAM museum. One of its characters is a self-portrait. A monograph on White's life and work, by Mark Child, is in the collection of Swindon Central Library.

White is depicted in a 2015 mural on Cambria Bridge in Swindon (Note: Cambria Bridge crosses the line of the former Wilts & Berks Canal at 51.558110°N 1.792280°W; the mural is viewable from below the bridge.), by Ed Russell and James Habgood. The bridge was previously decorated by one of White's own murals. The later mural bears the inscription "Dedicated to Ken White's Cambria Bridge mural in 1982". When the Golden Lion Bridge mural was restored by Tim Carroll in 2025, an extra figure, depicting White, was inserted.

== Personal life and death ==
White was married to Jan. They had a home in Swindon's Old Town district. They had three children, Joel, Asa and Laura.

White died in Swindon on 24 December 2025 at the age of 82. He was admitted to Great Western Hospital the week before.

His funeral was held at Christ Church in Swindon Old Town on 19 January 2026. Richard Branson sent a letter of condolence describing White as "one of the most extraordinary creative artists of our time".
