= Andrew Large =

British banker

Sir Andrew Large
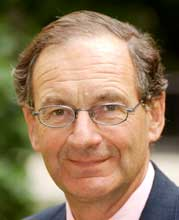
- Large in 2014 at the IMF in his capacity as a member of the Bank of England's Monetary Policy Committee
- Born: 7 August 1942 (age 83); Goudhurst, Kent, England
- Education: Winchester College; Corpus Christi College, Cambridge; INSEAD
- Known for: Bank of England Deputy Governor (2002–06)
- Spouse(s): Susan Melville, Lady Large (m. 1967)

Sir Andrew McLeod Brooks Large (born 7 August 1942) was Deputy Governor of the Bank of England, and a member of its Monetary Policy Committee from September 2002 to January 2006.

== Early life and education ==
Andrew McLeod Brooks Large was born in 1942, the son of Major General Stanley Eyre Large, MBE and Janet Mary Brooks. He was educated at Winchester College, a boarding school in Winchester, Hampshire. As a boy he travelled the world with his father, a Scottish army doctor. He attended Corpus Christi College, Cambridge, for university, taking an honours B.A. degree.

Large began his career with British Petroleum, where he worked from 1964 to 1971. BP put him in marketing, sent him to Malaysia, and then to the business school INSEAD, where he got his MBA in 1970.

== Career ==
In 1971 Large began his career as an investment banker that lasted for 20 years, first at Orion Bank and then at the Swiss Bank Corporation, where he served on the management board from 1987 to 1989 (the only non-Swiss person on the executive team). In 1988 he was appointed chairman of The Securities Association (TSA) set up in advance of the Financial Services Act of 1986 at the time of the "Big Bang" of the 1980s as well as a seat on the Takeovers Panel. In the early 1990s, he moved to Wales to run his own advisory firm, Large Smith and Walter, while "picking up directorships" (Nuclear Electric, Rank Hovis McDougall, Dowty, English China Clays, and Phoenix Securities).

In 1992, he became chairman of the UK Securities and Investments Board (SIB), the precursor of today's Financial Services Authority (FSA) in the wake of the 1992 pension fund scandal, when it came to light that businessman Robert Maxwell had plundered in excess of £400 from the pension fund of the Mirror Group, his failing company, in a desperate and unsuccessful attempt to keep it afloat. Large stopped short of proposing the end of the self-regulation among asset managers that had been established in the 1980s, he suggested more SIB leadership. As SIB Chair, Large started the reforming the SIB; instead of conducting the "Maxwell witch-hunt that ministers demanded", he combined "lighter regulation with stricter disclosure and tougher penalties". Large resigned in 1997, after the general election that ushered in a new Chancellor named Gordon Brown who wanted to ramp up financial regulation.

Next, he served as deputy chairman of Barclays Bank from 1998 to 2002, during which he was also Chairman of Euroclear, the Brussels-based financial services company. At the same time he, served as the Managing Director of the IMF's Capital Markets Consultative Group between 1999 and 2002, and chaired for the Group of Thirty a global report into strengthening the global financial market infrastructure for clearing and settlement.

In September 2002, Governor of the Bank of England Edward George announced that Large had accepted to serve as Deputy Governor, a choice some reports described as "unexpected".

He was the first chair of the Hedge Fund Working Group, which has been rechristened the Standards Board for Alternative Investments (SBAI) in September 2017. During his leadership, the group created the original standards. He also serves on the advisory board of the Official Monetary and Financial Institutions Forum (OMFIF), where he is regularly involved in meetings about financial and monetary policy. He is also Chairman of the Senior Advisory Board of Oliver Wyman, Senior Adviser to the Standards Board for Alternative Investments (formerly the Hedge Fund Standards Board), Chairman of the Advisory Committee of Marshall Wace, a hedge fund, and Chairman of the Board Risk Committee of Axis Capital, Bermuda.

Sir Andrew Large was knighted in 1996.

Large served as Warden of Winchester College, his alma mater, until September 2008. Additionally, he also chaired the INSEAD Advisory Council (where he got his MBA) and was a member of the INSEAD Board from 1998 to 2010. He was on the governing body of Abingdon School from 1991–1998.

== Personal life ==
In 1967, Large married Susan Melville, daughter of Sir Ronald Melville KCB. They have two sons, Alexander (born 1970) and James (born 1972), and a daughter, Georgina (born 1976).

On 3 April 2012, his wife, Lady Large, was appointed the new High Sheriff of Powys at a ceremony in Brecon Guildhall. He collects ancient varieties of apple trees which he grows at his home in Wales and is President of the Marcher Apple Network, "group of apple enthusiasts keen to revive old varieties of apples and pears" that has turned into a charity that "strives to protect these varieties in a number of different ways".
