= Ark Putney Academy =

Location
- Pullman Gardens; Putney Heath, Putney, London, SW15 3DG; England; 51.454892°N 0.2252125°W

Information
- Former name: Elliott School
- Type: Academy
- Religious affiliation: Secular
- Established: 1904 as Elliot School; 2012 as ARK Putney Academy
- Local authority: Wandsworth
- Trust: Ark Schools
- Department for Education URN: 138681 Tables
- Ofsted: Reports
- Principal: Alison Downey
- Staff: >100
- Gender: Coeducational
- Age: 11 to 18
- Enrolment: 944 (as of 2022)
- Houses: Brunel, Turing, Rowling, McQueen
- Colours: Blue, Orange, Red, Purple
- Publication: The Ark, Ark Schools, The Ark Putney Urban Diary
- Website: https://arkputney.org/

Ark Putney Academy (formerly Elliott School) is a co-educational secondary school and sixth form with academy status, located in the Putney Heath area of the London Borough of Wandsworth, England.

== History ==
It was first established as Southfields School in 1904 on Merton Road, Southfields. The school was renamed Elliott School in 1911, and in 1956 it amalgamated with Huntingfield Secondary Modern School on a new site in Pullman Gardens, to become Elliott Comprehensive School. Former pupils include a number of famous people such as Pierce Brosnan, and the school has appeared in the films Love Actually and The Kid Who Would Be King. In 2012 the school converted to academy status and was renamed ARK Putney Academy.

The main part of school is a Grade II listed building designed in the early 1950s by G A Trevett of the London County Council architects' department. It was among the early work of John Bancroft who worked as an assistant on the project. English Heritage have described it as "perhaps the finest of the large comprehensive schools built by the London County Council architects".

In 2012 Wandsworth Council decided that much of the new ARK Putney Academy's open space would be sold for housing to pay for a major refurbishment of the main school buildings. The decision, which included the demolition of some existing outer buildings, received formal planning permission in October 2013, with the refurbishment taking place the following year.
