= Saffron Aldridge =

English fashion model

- Born: 1968 (age 57–58); London, England
- Occupation: Fashion model
- Spouses: Toby Constantine (m. 1994; div. 1999); Ian Wace (m. 2012, divorced)
- Children: 2
- Father: Alan Aldridge
- Relatives: Miles Aldridge (brother); Lily Aldridge (half-sister); Ruby Aldridge (half-sister); Caleb Followill (half-brother-in-law)
- Modeling information
- Height: 5 ft 9.75 in (177 cm)
- Hair color: Brown
- Eye color: Green

Saffron Aldridge (born 1968) is an English fashion model. Discovered at the age of sixteen, she rose to prominence working for Ralph Lauren in the 1990s. Her siblings include fashion photographer Miles Aldridge and half-sisters, models Lily Aldridge and Ruby Aldridge.

== Early life ==
Born in Parliament Hill, North London, Aldridge is the daughter of graphic designer Alan Aldridge and Rita Farthing. From age 13 to 16, she worked at Camden Lock market and people often suggested that she should be a model. She knew a girl working on a stall who was with the Take Two modeling agency, so one day she decided to go along and they took her on.

== Career ==
Aldridge began her career as a model at sixteen years old wearing jewellery for The Field magazine.

Aged 17, she managed to get herself a lucky break working for a Ralph Lauren campaign. She was brought in as an extra because a friend of hers knew Bruce Weber, who was shooting the campaign. It was this job that gave her her first contract with Ralph and from then on, Aldridge gained popularity as former face of Ralph Lauren.

She was photographed for numerous advertising campaigns such as Burberry, Gianfranco Ferré, Harrods, La Perla, Olay, Ralph Lauren, Selfridges, Laura Biagiotti and also appeared on the covers of Italian and Brazilian magazines. In 1993 she was the first fashion model to be photographed while carrying her child on the cover of the Italian magazine Donna.

After almost two decades of modelling, Aldridge has moved on to launch a charity for children. In 1998, she presented a fundraising project called Through the Eyes of a Child, with the proceeds going to the NSPCC. Aldridge persuaded Canon Inc. to donate 200 free cameras, that were handed out to children between the ages of 3 and 12. They could photograph anything they wanted but they were under instructions not to get help from grown-ups. The top 200 shots went on display and were featured in a coffee-table book. Altogether, including the charity dinner and auction (supported by many celebrities such as Hugh Grant, Gwyneth Paltrow, Bryan Adams and Sting), the project raised £150,000. The following years the campaign was repeated worldwide. With her husband Ian Wace, Aldridge also works for ARK.

== Personal life ==
After her parents' divorce at the age of eight, Aldridge grew up in North London with her mother and brothers Marc and Miles Aldridge. Models Lily and Ruby Aldridge are her half-sisters from Alan's second marriage in Los Angeles.

She suffered self-doubt for many years of her career as a model, also marked by the loss of her best friend in the Marchioness disaster and by the death of her mother from ovarian cancer in 1992. While she was modelling, in 1993 Aldridge became pregnant with her first child, Milo, by her partner Simon Astaire. A year later she married media executive Toby Constantine and gave birth to her second son, Finn Constantine in 1997, but the marriage eventually led to divorce. In 2012, she married the financier Ian Wace. They separated in 2023 and subsequently divorced.
