= Trade idea =

Trade ideas (or trading ideas, or "Electronic Alpha-Capture") are investment ideas, typically equity related, ("long" i.e. buy, or "short" i.e. sell) which are sent by institutional stockbrokers to their institutional clients (i.e. this is not a service provided to private clients); recipients of trade ideas are thus hedge funds, a bank’s proprietary trading desks, and money managers.

Trade ideas are sent to the client with a recommendation to buy or sell, an investment value (e.g. $2 million) and often a timeframe and an indication of level of conviction. The most active consumers of Trade Ideas are funds using quantitative or systematic strategies. They typically propose a trade in a specific stock and are developed by the individual idea author’s (e.g. a salesman) own knowledge of their client’s particular area of investment interest, and so will take into account: the client’s investment style, portfolio size and the sector and geographic focus.

Brokers only send trade ideas to their most valuable clients. In return for receiving ideas that provide superior investment returns they are rewarded with increased commission payments from their clients. Trade Ideas are therefore highly performance related.

== See also ==
- Alpha capture system
- Financial analyst § Securities firms
- Sales and trading
- Securities research
- Target price
