= Sales and trading =

Divisions of investment banks

Sales and trading is one of the primary front-office divisions of major investment banks. The term is typically reserved for the trading activities done by sell-side investment banks who are primarily engaged in making markets for institutional clients in various forms of securities. The trading floor of these banks will contain dedicated desks who generally focus exclusively on trading one form of security. These desks will more generally fall within the categories of fixed income, currencies, commodities, or equities.

In market making, traders will buy and sell financial products primarily to facilitate the investment and trading activities of its clients with the goal of making an incremental amount of money on each trade.

== Sales ==
The Sales component refers to the investment bank's sales force within the sales and trading division. Generally, sales members will be placed on dedicated desks just as traders are and will have a dedicated list of clients that they are responsible for managing. The sales role is the client-facing role of the S&T division of a bank, which thus necessitates sales members interacting directly with institutional clients in order to assess their needs, provide general market commentary, and work with other members of the desk such as traders or structurers in order to price and execute their desired trades.

The sales and trading function will also typically employ financial analysts that provide trading strategy advice to external as well as internal clients to support sales and trading. This strategy often affects the way the firm will operate in the market, the direction it would like to take in terms of its proprietary and flow positions, the suggestions salespersons give to clients, as well as the way structurers create new products.

== Trading ==
Banks also undertake risk through proprietary trading (though this is subject to regulation within the US and certain European markets), done by a special set of traders who do not interface with clients and through "principal risk", risk undertaken by a trader after he buys or sells a product to a client and does not hedge his total exposure. Banks seek to maximize profitability for a given amount of risk on their balance sheet. The necessity for numerical ability in sales and trading has created jobs for physics, math and engineering Ph.D.s who act as quantitative analysts.

== Regulation of proprietary trading ==
Sales and trading activities may include client facilitation, market making, underwriting support, hedging, and risk management. In the United States, the Volcker Rule generally restricts banking entities from engaging in proprietary trading, while allowing certain permitted activities such as underwriting, market making-related activity, risk-mitigating hedging, trading in government obligations, and acting as an agent, broker, or custodian.

This regulatory framework distinguishes trading conducted primarily for a bank's own account from trading activity connected to client service or market liquidity. Permitted activities remain subject to limits where they involve material conflicts of interest, exposure to high-risk assets or trading strategies, or a threat to the safety and soundness of the banking entity or to U.S. financial stability.

== See also ==
- Investment banking
- Stock trader
- Trader (finance)
- Proprietary trading
- Trade idea
