= Miles Aldridge =

English fashion photographer (born 1964)

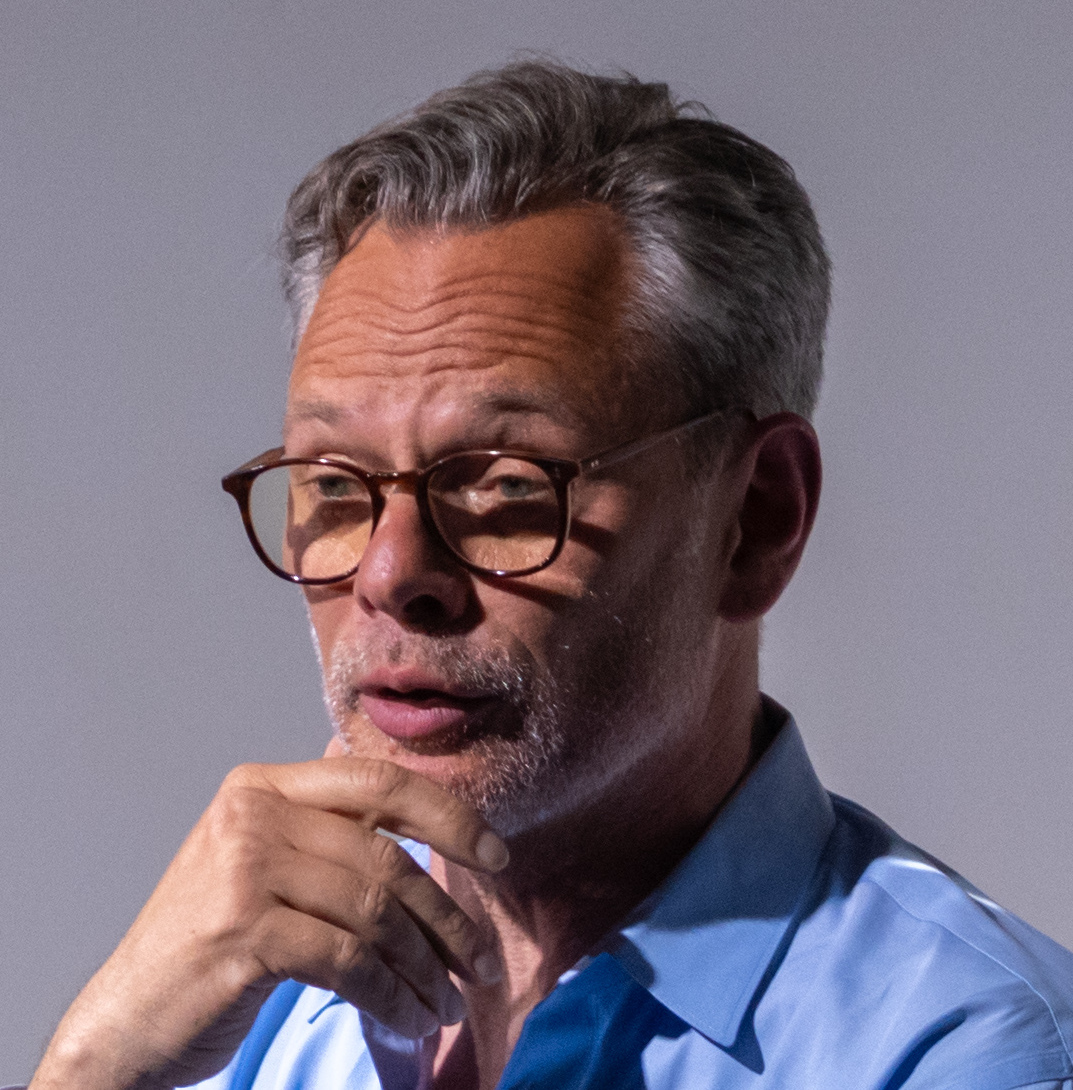
- Aldridge in 2023
- Born: 29 September 1964 (age 62); North London, England
- Occupations: Photographer, artist
- Years active: 1995–present
- Spouse: Kristen McMenamy (m. 1997–2013)
- Children: 3
- Father: Alan Aldridge
- Relatives: Saffron Aldridge (sister); Lily Aldridge (half-sister); Ruby Aldridge (half-sister); Caleb Followill (half-brother-in-law)

Miles Aldridge (born 1964) is a British fashion photographer and artist. His monographs include Acid Candy (2008); The Cabinet (2006); Pictures for Photographs (2009); and Other Pictures (2013). Aldridge's work is held in the collection of the National Portrait Gallery, London.

== Early life ==
Born in North London to graphic designer Alan Aldridge, Miles grew up accustomed to celebrity – John Lennon was a family friend, as well as Eric Clapton and Elton John. When he was a child, he posed with his father for Lord Snowdon. At the age of 12, Alan Aldridge moved to Los Angeles where he formed a new family. Miles stayed in London with his mother Rita, a housewife, and his brother Marc and sister Saffron. His two half-sisters Lily and Ruby are models. He studied illustration at the Central St Martins to follow his father's steps and afterwards briefly directed pop videos (for bands including The Verve, The Charlatans and Catherine Wheel).

He moved into photography by chance: he sent some photos of an aspiring model girlfriend to an agency and fell into fashion when British Vogue called him as well as her. By then he had hung out on shoots with his sister and travelled to New York in the mid-nineties, where he started working almost immediately.

== Career ==
Initially Aldridge shot covers of the American monthly fashion magazine W, then he worked for Numéro, Teen Vogue, Vogue Nippon, The New York Times Magazine, GQ, The New Yorker, The Face, Paradis, Harper's Bazaar, and Vogue Italia. Aldridge worked as an advertising photographer for Longchamp, MAC Cosmetics, Sergio Rossi, Carolina Herrera, Lavazza and Mercedes E-Class. He shot for fashion designers such as Karl Lagerfeld, Giorgio Armani, Yves Saint Laurent and Paul Smith.

In 2009, the exhibition and monographic volume Pictures for Photographs were the peak of a project combining drawings and photographs, born from a collaboration with Karl Lagerfeld and Gerhard Steidl.

== Style ==
His influences include film directors Derek Jarman, David Lynch, Federico Fellini, Michelangelo Antonioni, the photographer Richard Avedon and the psychedelic graphic design of his father, Alan Aldridge. His work is highly controlled with a cinematic effect.

== Exhibitions ==
=== Solo exhibitions ===
- 2008: Acid Candy, Galerie Alex Daniels, Amsterdam
- 2009: Pictures for Photographs, Steven Kasher Gallery
- 2010: Lavazza 2010, Foundation Centre of Photography/ Fundacja Centrum Fotografii, Poland
- 2010: 13 Women, Contributed – Studio for the Arts, Berlin, Germany
- 2010: Gallery Hotel Art, Florence
- 2011: Ein Bild von einem Auto, Galerie der Stadt Sindelfingen, Sindelfingen, Germany
- 2013: Retrospective: I Only Want You to Love Me, Somerset House, London
- Weird Beauty, International Center of Photography, New York

=== Group exhibitions ===
- 2002: Archeology of Elegance, Haus der Photographie / Deichtorhallen, Hamburg, Germany
- 2007: The Cabinet, Art Photo Expo, Art Basel, Miami Beach, United States
- 2008: Traum Frauen – 50 Starfotografen zeigen ihre Vision von Schönheit, Haus der Photographie / Deichtorhallen, Hamburg, Germany
- 2008: Art Photo Expo, Art Basel, Miami Beach, United States
- 2009: Weird Beauty: Fashion Photography Now – Year of Fashion, ICP International Center of Photography, New York
- 2010: A Positive View, Somerset House, London
- 2011: Beauty Culture, The Annenberg Space for Photography, Los Angeles, United States
- 2011: Selling Dreams: One Hundred Years of Fashion Photography, organised by the V&A, at Light House Media Centre, Wolverhampton, UK
- 2011: Ein Bild von einem Auto, Galerie der Stadt Sindelfingen, Sindelfingen, Germany
- 2012: Best of Fashion Photography, Contributed Studio for the Arts, Berlin, Germany
- 2013: Dream Woman + Dream Men, Central Exhibition Hall 'Manage', Saint-Petersburg, Russia
- 2013: New Fashion Photography, Contributed Studio for the Arts, Berlin, Germany
- 2014: The Fashion World of Jean Paul Gaultier: From the Sidewalk to the Catwalk, The Brooklyn Museum, New York
- 2014: The Fashion World of Jean Paul Gaultier: From the Sidewalk to the Catwalk, Barbican Art Gallery, London
- 2014: Aipad New York, Aipad, New York, United States
- 2015: Sleepless - The Bed in History and Contemporary Art, 21er Haus of the Belvedere, Vienna, Austria
- 2015: Coming into Fashion: A Century of Photography at Conde Nast, Norton Museum of Art, West Palm Beach, United States
- 2015: Coming into Fashion: A Century of Photography at Conde Nast, Multimedia Art Museum, Moscow
- 2017: The Critic as Artist, Reading Museum, Reading, UK
- 2020: Virgin Mary. Supermarkets. Popcorn. Photographs 1999 to 2020, Fotografiska Stockholm, Sweden
- 2021: Virgin Mary. Supermarkets. Popcorn. Photographs 1999 to 2020, Fotografiska New York, USA
- 2022: Virgin Mary. Supermarkets. Popcorn. Photographs 1999 to 2020, Oslo Negativ, Norway
- 2023: Virgin Mary. Supermarkets. Popcorn. Photographs 1999 to 2020, Fotografiska Tallinn, Estonia
- 2024: Virgin Mary. Supermarkets. Popcorn. Photographs 1999 to 2020, Fotografiska Berlin, Germany

== Publications ==
=== Publications by Aldridge ===
- 2006: The Cabinet, Reflex Gallery, Amsterdam. With an introduction by Marilyn Manson.
- 2008: Acid Candy, Reflex Editions, Amsterdam. With an introduction by Glenn O'Brien.
- 2009: Pictures for Photographs, Steidl, Germany
- 2010: Kristen: As seen by Miles Aldridge and Chantal Joffe, Reflex Editions, Amsterdam
- 2013: Miles Aldridge: Other Pictures, Steidl, Germany
- 2013: Miles Aldridge: I Only Want You To Love Me, Rizzoli International Publications
- 2014: Miles Aldridge's Carousel, Sims Reed Gallery, London
- 2014: One Black & White and Nineteen Colour Photographs, Reflex, Amsterdam
- 2014: Miles of Mac, Rizzoli, New York
- 2016: Please return Polaroid, Steidl, Germany
- 2016: (after Cattelan), Colour Pictures, London
- Zero Zero Vol. 02.

=== Publications with contributions by Aldridge ===
- 2015: Sleeples - The Bed in History and Contemporary Art, 21er Haus Belvedere, Vienna
- 2016: Bling Bling Baby!, Hate Cantz Verlag GmbH, Germany

== Collections ==
Aldridge's work is held in the following permanent collections:

- National Portrait Gallery, London
- Victoria and Albert Museum, London
- British Museum
