= Lindsay Ellingson =

American model and businesswoman (born 1984)

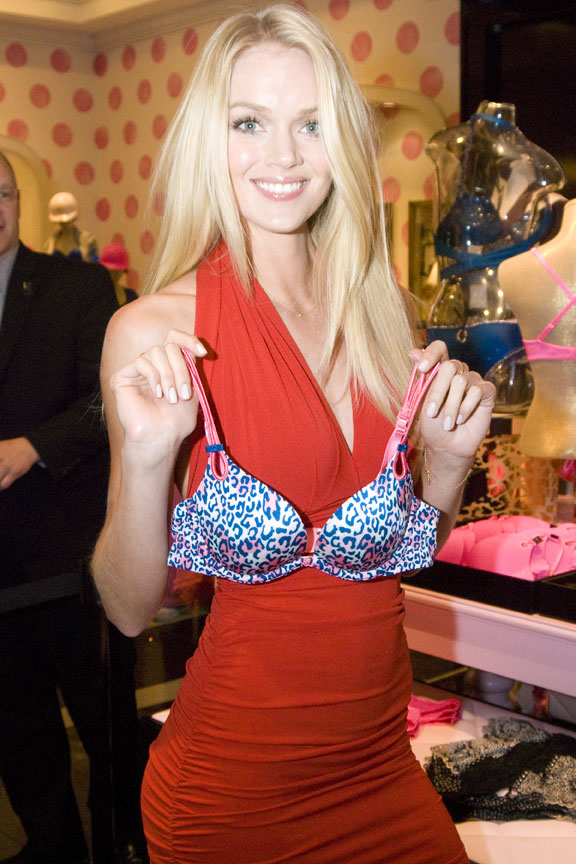
- Ellingson in 2011
- Born: Lindsay Marie Ellingson; November 19, 1984 (age 41); San Bernardino County, California, U.S.
- Occupations: Model; businesswoman
- Years active: 2000–present
- Spouse: Sean Clayton (m. 2014)
- Children: 3
- Modeling information
- Height: 5 ft 11 in (1.80 m)
- Hair color: Blonde
- Eye color: Blue
- Agency: Wilhelmina Models (New York); Why Not Model Management (Milan); Priscilla's Model Management (Sydney)

Lindsay Marie Ellingson (born November 19, 1984) is an American model. She was a Victoria's Secret Angel from 2011 to 2014.

== Early life ==
Ellingson, who is of Norwegian ancestry, was born in San Bernardino County, California, and grew up in Moreno Valley, California. Prior to being discovered on the street, she went to college at the University of California, San Diego to study biology. After a test shoot, she was sent to Paris by her model agency, where she met John Galliano who put her on the map.

== Career ==
Ellingson first walked the runway in the Spring/Summer 2005 ready-to-wear shows. She has walked in numerous shows including Shiatzy Chen, Blumarine, Chanel, Christian Dior, John Galliano, Gucci, Valentino, Lacoste, Victoria's Secret, Marc Jacobs, Oscar de la Renta, Zac Posen, Diane Von Furstenberg, Sophie Theallet, and Giorgio Armani. Her campaigns include Moschino, DKNY, MAC, Dolce and Gabbana, Charles David, H&M, and Tommy Hilfiger. She has graced the covers of Vogue, Marie Claire, Elle, D Magazine, GQ and L'Officiel internationally and has appeared in the pages of Allure, Flair, V, and i-D as well.

Her career with Victoria's Secret began in 2007, where she walked for the brand for 7 straight years. Ellingson and Emanuela de Paula were chosen to be spokeswomen for "Body by Victoria" by Victoria's Secret alongside Alessandra Ambrosio and Marisa Miller. She was also a featured model in the 2010 Victoria's Secret "SWIM" catalog. She is currently listed as one of the brand's 12 "supermodels" and was one of the featured models during the 2009 fashion show. In 2011, she became one of the brand's signature Angels, as well as the face of its perfume line VS Attractions and its new bra, Gorgeous. She has also worked with the French cosmetics company Clarins.

== Personal life ==
In November 2013, after six years of dating, Ellingson became engaged to her long-term boyfriend Sean Clayton, a medical equipment salesman and former college football player. They were married on July 12, 2014, in Bluffton, South Carolina. They have two sons, Carter John, born on May 15, 2020 and Roen Allen, born on December 11, 2021. On November 9, 2024 she gave birth to their daughter, Ella Viive Marie Clayton.
