= Ruby Aldridge =

American fashion model and singer

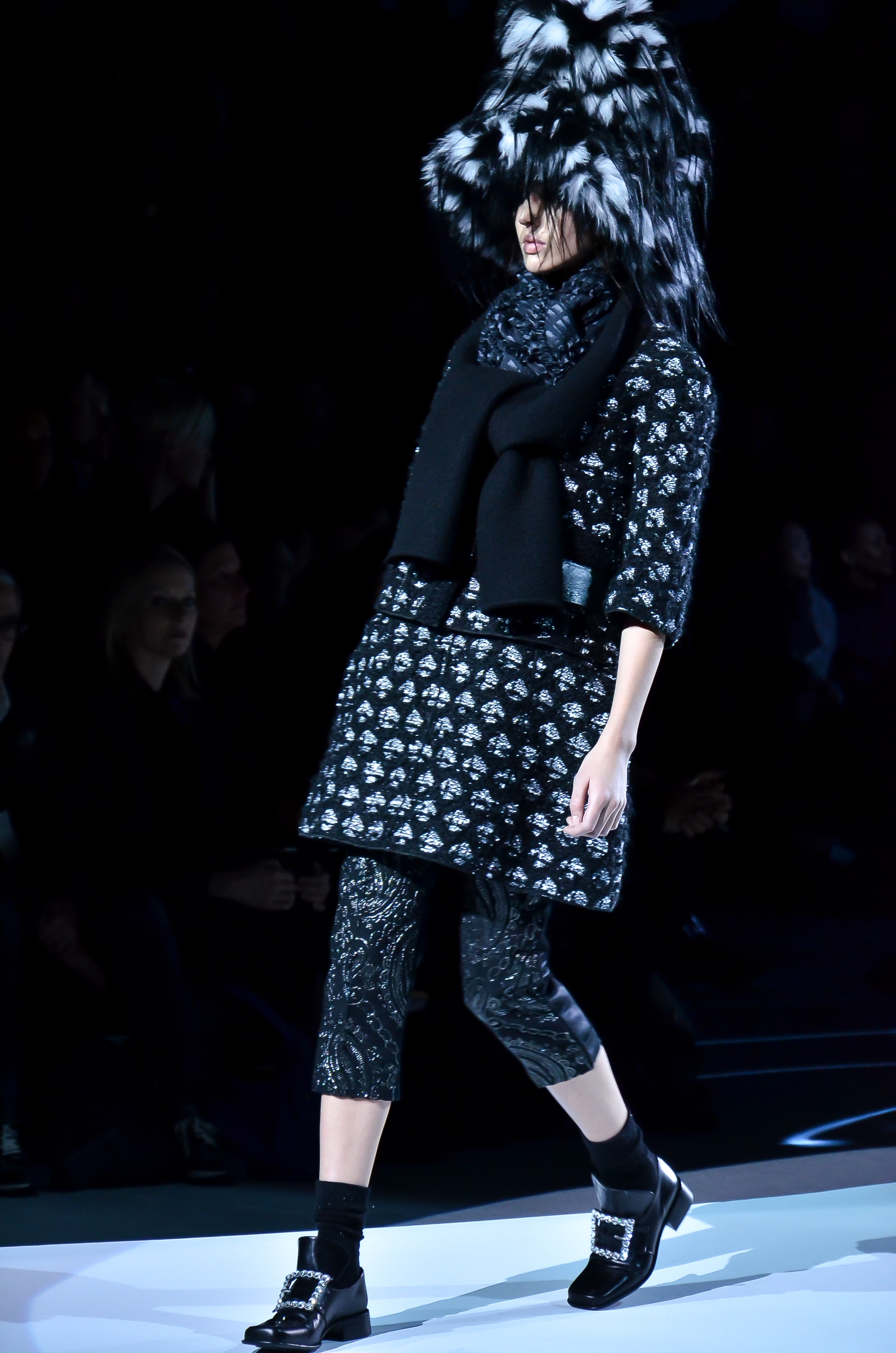
- Aldridge at the Fall-Winter August 2012
- Born: Ruby Rose Aldridge; August 26, 1991 (age 35); Los Angeles, California, U.S.
- Occupations: Model, singer
- Parents: Alan Aldridge (father); Laura Lyons (mother)
- Relatives: Lily Aldridge (sister); Miles Aldridge (half-brother); Saffron Aldridge (half-sister); Caleb Followill (brother-in-law)
- Modeling information
- Height: 5 ft 10.5 in (1.79 m)
- Hair color: Red
- Eye color: Brown
- Agency: IMG Models (New York, London); Traffic Models (Barcelona); Modelwerk (Hamburg); MIKAs (Stockholm); Bravo Models (Tokyo)

Ruby Rose Aldridge (born August 26, 1991) is an American fashion model and singer. During the years of 2008–2012, Ruby Aldridge was the "face" of brands such as Coach, Marc by Marc Jacobs, Valentino, and Calvin Klein. During the 2011 fall fashion week, Aldridge opened four fashion shows which placed her, at that time, 7th in terms of the number of these appearances in a given fashion week. As of this date, she has walked in nearly 200 fashion shows, including for top designers such as Alberta Ferretti, Missoni, Sonia Rykiel, Valentino, Dolce & Gabbana, Marc Jacobs, and others, and has appeared on the covers of Harper's Bazaar, L'Express Styles, and L'Officiel, and in major magazine spreads in The New York Times, Vanity Fair, and in the Vogue editions of several countries (e.g., Italy, the U.S., China, Russia, and Latin America). Ruby Aldridge is the daughter of former Playboy playmate Laura Lyons and artist and graphic designer Alan Aldridge, and younger sister of fashion model Lily Aldridge.

== Early life ==
Aldridge is the daughter of former Playboy playmate Laura Lyons and British artist and graphic designer Alan Aldridge. She has an older sister, fashion model Lily Aldridge. She also has two brothers, Franco Aldridge (known as Franco Evans) and artist Miles Aldridge. Her half-sister is fashion model and freelance journalist Saffron Aldridge.

== Career ==
=== Modeling ===
Aldridge was discovered in 2005 when her sister Lily introduced her to the fashion world. She is currently signed at NEXT Model Management, Modelwerk and Chic Management agencies.

Aldridge became the face of Coach in 2008, the face of Marc by Marc Jacobs in 2010, of Valentino in 2011, and of CK One Cosmetics in 2012.

During the fall fashion week in 2011, Aldridge opened 4 fashion shows, placing her 7th after Arizona Muse, Daphne Groeneveld, Karmen Pedaru, Caroline Brasch Nielsen, Alana Zimmer and Karlie Kloss in terms of the number of these appearances in a given fashion week.

Ruby Aldridge has represented the brands of Marc Jacobs, Zac Posen, Calvin Klein, Theory, Urban Outfitters, Valentino, Carolina Herrera, Nordstrom, Just Cavalli, Coach, Lacoste, and Emporio Armani.

As of this date, Aldridge has walked in nearly 200 fashion shows, including for such brands as:

- Alberta Ferretti,
- Alexander Wang
- Altuzarra, BCBG Max Azria
- Bottega Veneta
- Carolina Herrera
- Chanel
- Chloe
- Costume National
- Derek Lam
- Diane von Fürstenberg
- Diesel
- Dior
- Dolce & Gabbana
- Donna Karan
- Dries Van Noten
- EDUN
- Elie Saab
- Emilio Pucci
- Ermanno Scervino
- Felipe Oliveira Baptista
- Francesco Scognamiglio
- Giambattista Valli
- Gucci
- H&M
- Haider Ackermann
- Helmut Lang
- Hermès
- Hervé Léger
- J Brand
- Jason Wu
- Jeremy Scott
- Jill Stuart
- John Galliano
- Kanye West
- Kenzo
- Lacoste
- Lanvin
- Loewe
- Louis Vuitton
- Maison Martin Margiela
- Marc Jacobs
- Marchesa
- Marni
- Michael Kors
- Missoni
- Miu Miu
- Moschino
- Mugler
- Narciso Rodriguez
- Nina Ricci
- Oscar de la Renta
- Paco Rabanne
- Peter Som
- Ports 1961
- Prabal Gurung
- Prada
- Proenza Schouler
- Rag & Bone
- Richard Chai
- Roland Mouret
- Salvatore Ferragamo
- Sonia Rykiel
- Stella McCartney
- Tommy Hilfiger
- Tory Burch
- Trussardi
- Valentin Yudashkin
- Valentino
- Vera Wang
- Victoria Beckham
- Vionnet
- Yves Saint Laurent.

Aldridge has appeared on the covers of Harper's Bazaar, L'Express Styles (April 3, 2013), and L'Officiel (August 2013). She has also appeared in major spreads in the following magazines:

- Jalouse
- 10 Magazine
- Vogue China
- Interview
- Vogue Italia
- Vogue Espana
- V
- Vogue US
- Garage Magazine
- The New York Times
- Vogue Australia
- Dazed & Confused
- Vogue Turkey
- Vogue Russia
- Lucky
- Teen Vogue
- Vogue Netherlands
- Vogue Latino America, and
- Vanity Fair.

=== Music ===
Ruby Aldridge is part of a band called Texture alongside artist Bozidar Brazda.

=== Television ===
In 2008, she appeared in The Young and the Restless.
