= Charles Wace =

British businessman (born 1961)

Charles Wace (born 24 September 1961) is a British businessman, and a founder of the media group Twofour, a factual, features and entertainment television production and content agency. Wace stepped down as chief executive (CEO), following a sale of the group to LDC (Lloyds Development Capital) in 2013.

Wace is now Chief Executive of Limesnapper, which invests in a range of businesses that have intellectual property at their heart. It has also invested in residential and commercial property in London, South West England and the West Indies.

Wace was chairman of the Creative England Trading Company and adirector of Creative England. He chaired the UK independent trade body Producers Alliance for Cinema and Television (PACT) for two years. Wace is chairman of Beagle Media, which is based in Cornwall and London and specialises in factual broadcast television and business communications.

He is also Chairman of Rock Oyster Media, a television production company based in Plymouth that produces returning daytime series, talent-led factual programming and developing entertainment and digital IP. Rock Oyster Media

Wace was deputy chair of Falmouth University, and a member of its ventures board.

In 2012 the University of Plymouth awarded Wace an honorary doctorate. In 2010, Wace was awarded a Devon & Cornwall Royal Television Society outstanding achievement award for services to television.

Wace started his career in newspapers, before moving to BBC radio and television where he worked as a reporter and producer, before establishing Twofour in 1988.

His brother is British born financier, Ian Wace, co-founder of a London-based hedge fund.
