= The Beatles Illustrated Lyrics =

1969 book by The Beatles

- Cover, volume 1 (1969)
- Author: The Beatles; Alan Aldridge (editor)
- Cover artist: Alan Aldridge
- Subject: song lyrics
- Publisher: Houghton Mifflin; Macdonald Unit 75
- Publication date: 1969, 1971

The Beatles Illustrated Lyrics is a set of two books combining the lyrics of songs by the Beatles with accompanying illustrations and photographs, many by leading artists of the period. Comments from the Beatles on the origins of the songs are also included. The book was edited by Alan Aldridge, who also provided many of the illustrations. The books were published in the UK by Macdonald Unit 75 (later Macdonald & Co) in 1969 and 1971, and in the US by Delacorte Press/Seymour Lawrence. The book was reprinted as one volume in 1999 by Black Dog & Leventhal, and in a signed limited edition in 2012.

== Artists ==
Artists and photographers featured in the book (Part I) include:

- Julian Allen
- Clive Arrowsmith
- David Bailey
- Stephen Bobroff
- Mel Calman
- Seymour Chwast
- John Deakin
- Erté
- John Farman
- Hans Feurer
- Folon
- Milton Glaser
- John Glashan
- Rick Griffin
- Robert Grossman
- Chadwick Hall
- Rudolf Hausner
- David Hockney
- Art Kane
- David King
- Roger Law
- Peter Le Vasseur
- James Lloyd
- Jean Loup Sieff
- Brian Love
- Peter Max
- James Marsh
- Mike McInnerney
- David Montgomery
- Phillipe Mora
- Victor Moscoso
- Stanley Mouse
- Ronald Searle
- Donald Silverstein
- Diane Tipple
- Harri Peccinotti
- Colette Portal
- Enzo Ragazzini
- Ethan Russell
- Justin Todd
- Roland Topor
- Tomi Ungerer
- Richard Weigand
- Ken White
- Harry Willock

Artists and photographers featured in the book (Part II) include:

- John Alcorn ("Eight Days a Week")
- David Bailey ("Lovely Rita")
- R. O. Blechman ("No Reply")
- Charles Bragg ("I Call Your Name")
- Mel Calman ("Only a Northern Song")
- Seymour Chwast ("The Continuing Story of Bungalow Bill")
- Alan E. Cober ("From Me to You")
- John Deakin ("P.S. I Love You")
- Étienne Delessert ("Bad to Me")
- Heinz Edelmann (numerous)
- Erté ("Good Night")
- Michael English ("Another Girl")
- Michael Foreman ("And I Love Her")
- Milton Glaser ("A Day in the Life")
- John Glashan ("Can't Buy Me Love")
- Rick Griffin ("Why Don't We Do It in the Road?")
- Robert Grossman ("Back in the U.S.S.R.")
- Rudolf Hausner ("Magical Mystery Tour")
- David Hockney ("I'm So Tired")
- Nigel Holmes ("Her Majesty")
- Allen Jones ("Girl")
- Art Kane ("Eleanor Rigby")
- Jan Lenica ("All My Loving")
- James Marsh ("Michelle")
- Peter Max ("Glass Onion"), ("The Word")
- James McMullan ("I Feel Fine")
- Tony Meeuwissen ("Hello Little Girl")
- Philippe Mora ("Carry that Weight")
- Victor Moscoso ("Ob-La-Di, Ob-La-Da")
- Stanley Mouse ("The Inner Light")
- Barbara Nessim ("I'll Be Back")
- Eduardo Paolozzi ("Let It Be")
- Ethan Russell ("Got to Get You into My Life")
- Ronald Searle ("Help!")
- Jean Loup Sieff ("Good Day Sunshine")
- Ralph Steadman ("Oh! Darling")
- Tiger Tateishi ("That Means a Lot"), ("Wait")
- Roland Topor ("Sgt. Pepper's Lonely Hearts Club Band")
- Tomi Ungerer ("All I've Got to Do"), ("Fixing a Hole")
- David Vaughan ("Because")
- Tadanori Yokoo ("I'll Cry Instead")
- Michael Leonard ("When I'm Sixty Four")
