= The Ship's Cat =

1977 book by Richard Adams

- First edition cover
- Author: Richard Adams
- Original title: The Adventures & Brave Deeds Of The Ship's Cat On The Spanish Maine: Together With The Most Lamentable Losse Of The Alcestis & Triumphant Firing Of The Port Of Chagres
- Illustrator: Alan Aldridge
- Cover artist: Alan Aldridge
- Language: English
- Published: 1977
- Publisher: Jonathan Cape (UK), Alfred A. Knopf (US)
- Publication place: United Kingdom
- Media type: Print (hardcover)
- ISBN: 978-0-224-01441-0 (first edition, UK)

The Ship's Cat, also known under its full title of The Adventures & Brave Deeds Of The Ship's Cat On The Spanish Maine: Together With The Most Lamentable Losse Of The Alcestis & Triumphant Firing Of The Port Of Chagres, is a 1977 children's narrative poem that was written by Richard Adams with illustrations by Alan Aldridge. The book was first published through Jonathan Cape and describes the adventures of an anthropomorphic Elizabethan ship's cat.

== Plot summary ==
The book follows a ship cat referred to only as "Cat" or "Ship's Cat" who serves as a swashbuckling crew member of the English privateer ship Alcestis. The ship is eventually attacked by Spanish seamen, who capture the ship and its entire crew, who they take to the Panamanian port of Chagres. The cat is also imprisoned, only to be freed by the gaoler's daughter, who puts him to work in the officer's kitchen. There he waits until he has the perfect opportunity to free his crew. This opportunity arises on Saint Philip's Day, as the gaoler and his friends use it as an excuse to drink until they are very intoxicated. The cat frees his shipmates and together they manage to steal a ship, with the intent to sail back to England. Their acts are soon detected by the gaoler and his friends, who give chase until they come across Sir Francis Drake, who is just starting on his expedition to circumnavigate the globe. Free of their pursuers, the cat reveals to the rest of the crew that their stolen ship contained treasure, to the crew's joy. The book ends with the crew returning home, where Queen Elizabeth I knights the cat for his valour.

== Reception ==
The West Coast Review of Books rated The Ship's Cat at three stars.

== See also ==
- The Ship's Cat — Novel by Jock Brandis
- Ship's cat
- Sailors' superstitions
