= Alpha capture system =

Computer system

An alpha capture system is a computer system that enables investment banks and other organizations to submit "trading ideas" or "trade ideas" to clients in a written electronic format, for example TIM Group's TIM Ideas product or Bloomberg LP's Trade Ideas product.

== Introduction ==
Financial Services Authority Markets Division: Newsletter on Market Conduct and Transaction Reporting Issues, Issue No. 17, September 2006,

First used in 2001 by Marshall Wace they are an alternative to the traditional stockbrokering approach of communicating ideas and strategies to clients face-to-face or over the telephone.

== Terminology ==
The term alpha capture refers to the aim of such systems to help investors find alpha or market-beating returns on investments.

Submitted trade ideas are accompanied by a rationale, timeframe and conviction level and enable investors to quantify and monitor the performance of different ideas.

== See also ==
- Open Financial Exchange
- Foreign exchange aggregator
- Protocol on Trade Negotiations
