= Education Policy Institute =

UK think tank

- Type: Think tank
- Registration no.: Charity Commission in England and Wales: 1102186
- Legal status: Private company limited by guarantee
- Location: Westminster, London, United Kingdom
- Executive Chairman: David Laws
- Chairman of Trustees: Sir Paul Marshall
- Revenue: £1,079,200 (2017)
- Expenses: £953,742 (2017)
- Staff: 16 (2017)
- Website: epi.org.uk
- Formerly called: CentreForum, Centre for Reform

The Education Policy Institute (EPI) is an education policy think tank that aims to promote high-quality education outcomes through research and analysis. It is based at 150 Buckingham Palace Road, in central London.

== History ==
It was formed in 2016 as a rebranding and refocusing of CentreForum, a Liberal Democrat think tank that had been formed in 2005 with £1 million of funding from Paul Marshall, which itself was a relaunching and rebranding of the Centre for Reform, launched in 1995.

After the death of its principal benefactor, Richard Wainwright, in 2003, the Centre for Reform's future appeared uncertain. Paul Marshall agreed to fund the centre's future for at least three years and renamed it. Two Directors were recruited: Alasdair Murray from the Centre for European Reform; and Julian Astle MBE who had been working for Paddy Ashdown in Bosnia and Herzegovina. Duncan Greenland CBE became Chair of CentreForum's Trustee Board, remaining in that capacity until 2015. In early 2008 Jennifer Moses left to become a Special Adviser to Gordon Brown in Downing Street.

David Laws was hired to lead the centre in 2015 when it was refocused on education policy, before it was renamed as EPI in 2016. Theodore Agnew, Kevan Collins, and Sally Morgan were brought on to the board, and Natalie Perera was retained as executive director.

In July 2016 EPI published a study that found no significant differences in performance between Academy schools and local council run schools, and that multi-academy trusts running at least five schools performed worse than local council run schools.

== See also ==
- List of UK think tanks
