= Ark (charity) =

Children's charity based in London, England

- Absolute Return for Kids
- Established: 2002; 24 years ago
- Type: Charity
- Chief Executive: Lucy Heller
- Staff: ~3,000 (2024)
- Website: Official website

Absolute Return for Kids (branded as Ark) is an international children's educational charity based in London, England.

Ark is a registered charity under English law. In its reporting year 2017–18, excluding its few subsidiaries, it saw gross income of £14.66 million and had 42 employees.

Ark is the parent organisation of Ark Schools, a separate legal entity that is a multi-academy trust in the English education system, with 39 schools (as of 14 October 2022) and nearly 30,000 pupils.

== History ==
Ark was founded in 2002 by a group of hedge fund financiers including Paul Marshall and Ian Wace of Marshall Wace – and Arpad Busson of EIM Group, founding chairman of the charity's board of trustees.

Its aim is to invest by philanthropy to improve the life chances of children. Since 2014, the charity has been known as Ark or ARK.

Its charitable objects are: "to make sure that all children, regardless of their background, have access to a great education and real choices in life. ark incubates, launches and scales ventures that share our mission and values."

== Activities ==
Ark operates in the UK, South Africa, Zimbabwe and India. In the US, it is affiliated to Absolute Return for Kids US, Inc. (Ark US), a US philanthropic organisation which shares Ark's mission, and which supports the work of Ark through grants.

Ark works in education, health and child protection.

=== Schools ===
In England, its subsidiary Ark Schools is a multi-academy trust responsible for the schools that Ark runs which, typical of its class, has exempt charity status since 2011.

Ark Schools was created in 2004 to work with the Department for Education and local authorities to create new schools for inner cities through the academies programme. Its aim is to help close the achievement gap between children from disadvantaged and more affluent backgrounds. Its academies focus on raising attainment with the aim of every pupil going into higher education when they complete school. The schools are frequently held up by the government as an example of a successful multi-academy trust, where at least seven others were failing. Ofsted chief inspector Sir Michael Wilshaw stepped down in 2016 and was replaced by Amanda Spielman, the founder of Ark Schools and an accountant.

As of 2019, Ark runs 36 schools in the English education system, and plans to grow further. It has been, by a sector analyst of a periodical, criticised or seen as unusual for a record of running some schools, as at before 2020 at a deficit, relying on internal loans.

In 2022, the Birmingham school Ark Kings Academy was given a funding warning after being found inadequate during an Ofsted inspection. The Ofsted report, published in May 2022, following an inspection in February 2022, said: "Some pupils, particularly those who identify as LGBT, experience repeated name-calling and prejudiced behaviour. This means that pupils do not feel safe in the school."

== List of Ark schools in England ==
=== Primary schools ===
- Ark Atwood Primary Academy, Westminster
- Ark Ayrton Primary Academy, Portsmouth‡
- Ark Bentworth Primary Academy, Hammersmith & Fulham
- Ark Blacklands Primary Academy, Hastings‡
- Ark Brunel Primary Academy, Kensington and Chelsea
- Ark Byron Primary Academy, Ealing
- Ark Castledown Primary Academy, Hastings‡
- Ark Conway Primary Academy, Hammersmith & Fulham
- Ark Dickens Primary Academy, Portsmouth‡
- Ark Franklin Primary Academy, Brent
- Ark John Archer Primary Academy, Wandsworth
- Ark Little Ridge Primary Academy, Hastings‡
- Ark Oval Primary Academy, Croydon
- Ark Priory Primary Academy, Ealing
- Ark Swift Primary Academy, Hammersmith & Fulham
- Ark Tindal Primary Academy, Birmingham‡

=== Secondary schools ===
- Ark Acton Academy, Acton, Ealing
- Ark Alexandra Academy, Hastings‡
- Ark All Saints Academy, Southwark
- Ark Blake Academy, Croydon
- Ark Bolingbroke Academy, Wandsworth
- Ark Boulton Academy, Birmingham‡
- Ark Charter Academy, Portsmouth‡
- Ark Elvin Academy, Wembley, Brent
- Ark Evelyn Grace Academy, Lambeth
- Ark Greenwich Free School, Greenwich
- Ark Pioneer Academy, Barnet
- Ark Putney Academy, Wandsworth
- Ark St Alban's Academy, Birmingham‡
- Ark Soane Academy, Acton, Ealing
- Ark Walworth Academy, Southwark

=== All-through schools ===
- Ark Academy, Wembley, Brent
- Ark Burlington Danes Academy, Hammersmith & Fulham
- Ark Globe Academy, Southwark
- Ark Isaac Newton Academy, Redbridge
- Ark John Keats Academy, Enfield
- Ark King Solomon Academy, Westminster
- Ark Kings Academy, Birmingham‡
- Ark Victoria Academy, Birmingham‡

== Boards of Trustees ==
As of November 2018 the Ark Schools trustees were Ian Wace (Chairman), Lord Fink, Sir Paul Marshall, Anthony Williams and Anthony Clake. In April 2024, Marshall stood down as chair and trustee after being accused of liking and sharing far-right extremist social media posts and conspiracy theories. However, Ark Schools said he had "indicated earlier in the year his intention to step down from the Ark Schools Board". He has remained a trustee of ARK.

Arpad Busson sits on the global board and is chairman of Absolute Return for Kids, US, Inc.

== See also ==
- The Children's Investment Fund Foundation
- List of charitable foundations
