= Alan Aldridge =

British artist (1938–2017)

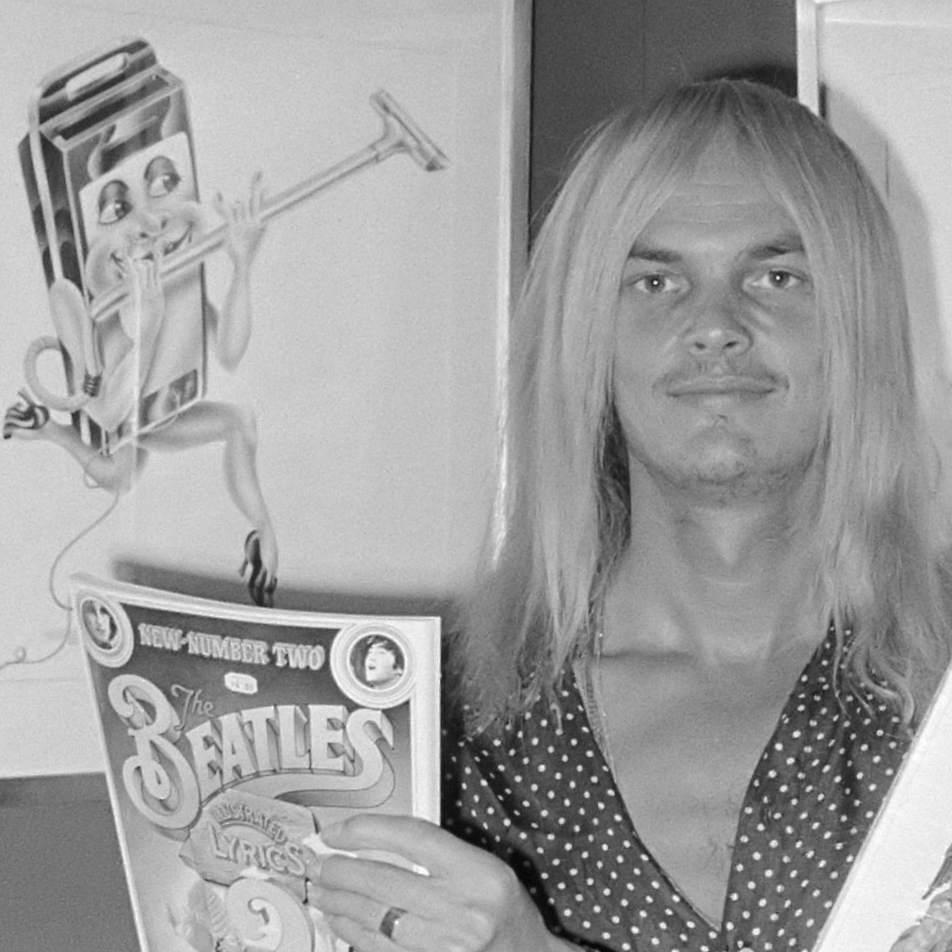
- Aldridge in 1971
- Born: 8 July 1938; London, England
- Died: 17 February 2017 (aged 78)
- Occupations: Artist, illustrator, graphic designer, creative director, graphic entertainer
- Years active: 1965–2017
- Spouses: Rita Farthing (divorced); Laura Lyons (divorced)
- Partner: Andrea Gayler
- Children: 8, including Miles, Saffron, Lily and Ruby
- Relatives: Caleb Followill (son-in-law)

Alan Aldridge (8 July 1938 – 17 February 2017) was a British artist, graphic designer and illustrator. He is best known for his psychedelic artwork made for books and record covers by The Beatles and The Who and for creating the original design that was used to create the Tongue and lips logo of the Rolling Stones. His bold, surreal, and colorful style was unique and different compared to the more restrained 'Swiss style' during his time.

== Personal life ==
Aldridge was born in North London but moved and lived in Los Angeles, California in the 1980s, searching for opportunities in film and design. On 17 February 2017, his death was announced via Instagram.

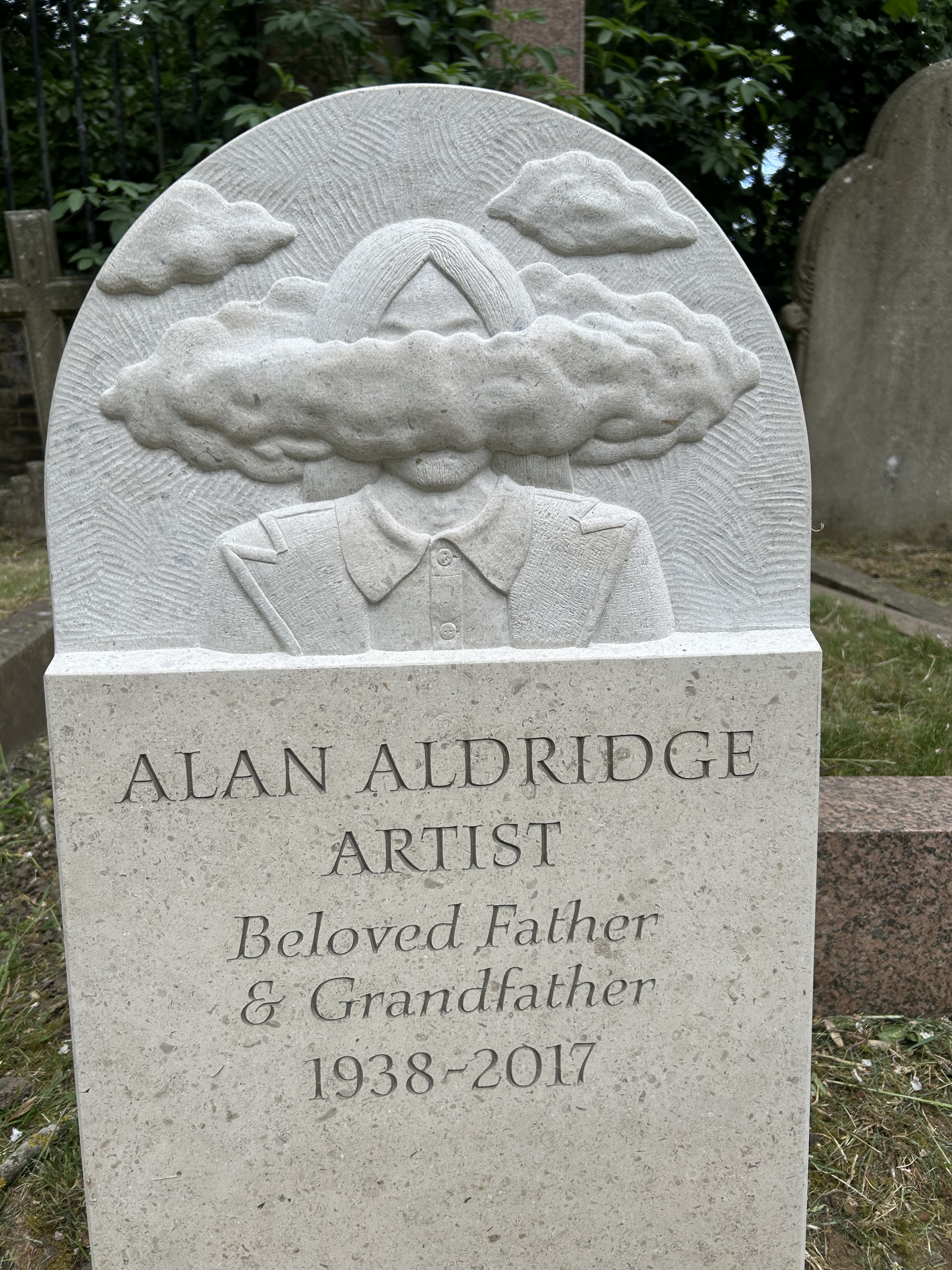
Grave of Alan Aldridge in Highgate Cemetery

He left behind 8 children: fashion photographer Miles Aldridge, model and social activist Saffron Aldridge and Marc from his first marriage to Rita Farthing; two sons, Pim and Toby, from a relationship with Andrea Galer; and two daughters, models Lily Aldridge and Ruby Aldridge, and a son, James, from his second marriage to Laura Lyons, which also ended in divorce. He was given 11 grandchildren.

One of his important but unfinished projects was The Gnole, a fantasy novel he wrote which was later picked up for a potential film adaptation. Although the movie was never produced, it remains as one of his notable creative works.

He died on 16 February 2017 and his ashes were interred on the east side of Highgate Cemetery on 27 June 2024.

== Career ==
Aldridge's illustration for Make Room! Make Room! by Harry Harrison typifies his early style.

Aldridge first worked as an illustrator at The Sunday Times Magazine. After doing some freelance book covers for Penguin Books, he was hired in March 1965 by Penguin's chief editor Tony Godwin to become the art director of Penguin. Over the next two years as art director, he especially focused on science fiction book covers and introduced his style which resonated with the mood of the time. In 1968 he moved to his own graphic-design firm, INK, which became closely involved with graphic images for the Beatles and Apple Corps.

During the 1960s and 1970s, he was responsible for a great many album covers, and helped create the graphic style of that era. He designed a series of science fiction book covers for Penguin Books. He made a big impression with his illustrations for the book The Beatles Illustrated Lyrics. He also provided illustrations for The Penguin Book of Comics, a history of British and American comic art. His work was characterised by a flowing, cartoony style and soft airbrushing – very much in step with the psychedelic styles of the times. His work includes the 1971 anti-war poster entitled A great place for hamburgers but who'd want to live there!

Aldridge created the poster for Andy Warhol and Paul Morrissey's 1966 experimental film Chelsea Girls. Warhol was very pleased with Aldridge's work saying that he "wished the movie was as good as the poster”

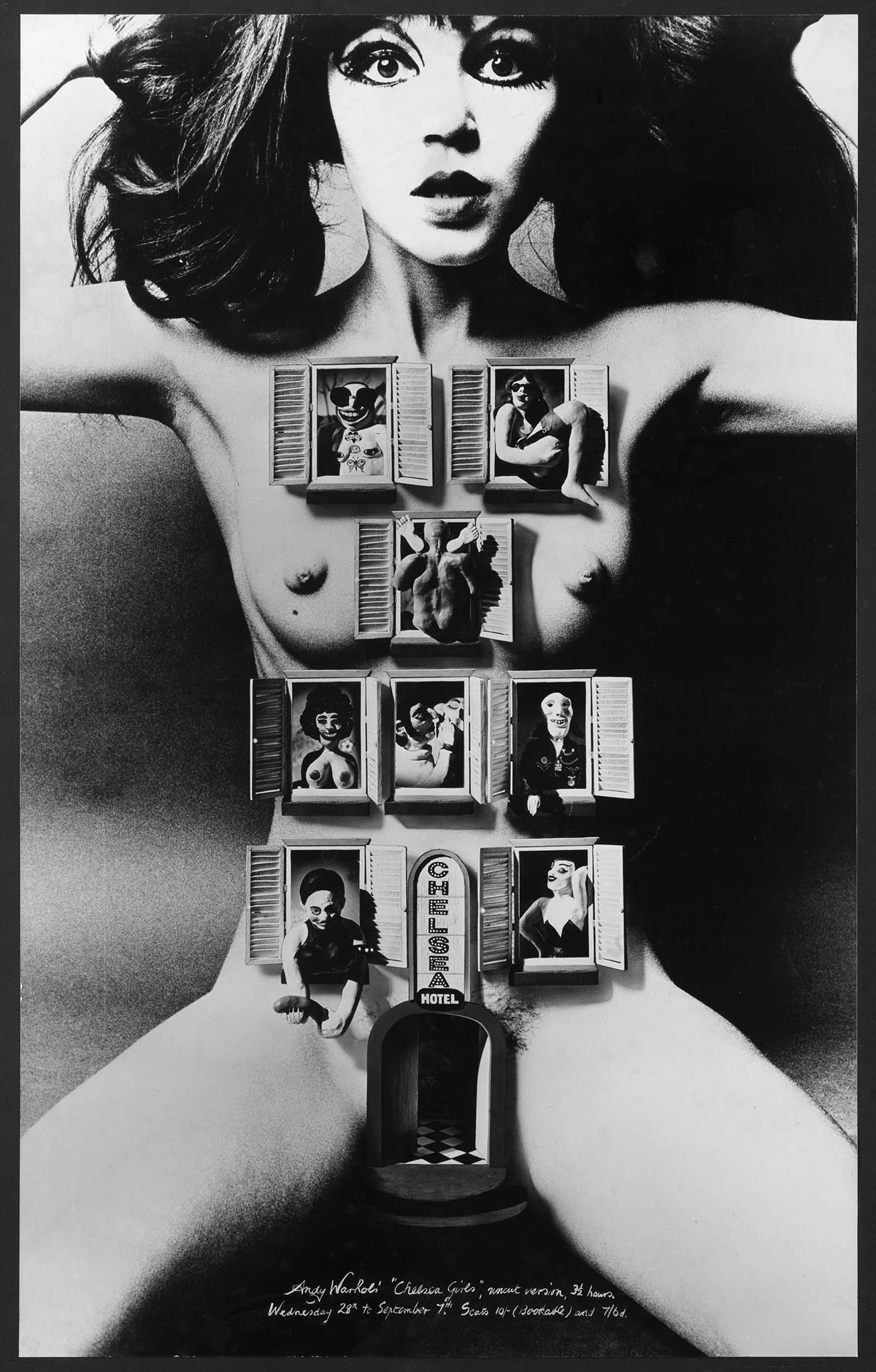
Aldridge's poster for the release of Andy Warhol's Chelsea Girls (1966)

In February 1969, Aldridge designed the graphics for the controversial Jane Arden play Vagina Rex and the Gas Oven at the London Arts Laboratory, Drury Lane.

Aldridge is possibly best known for the picture book The Butterfly Ball and the Grasshopper Feast (1973), a series of illustrations of anthropomorphic insects and other creatures, which he created in collaboration with Harry Willock. William Plomer wrote the accompanying verses. This was based on William Roscoe's poem of the same name, but was inspired when Aldridge read that John Tenniel had told Lewis Carroll it was impossible to draw a wasp in a wig.

Aldridge created the artwork for Elton John's 1975 album Captain Fantastic and the Brown Dirt Cowboy. in collaboration with HarryWillock. In 1977, he created an advertisement illustration for the Dutch beer brand Heineken. He was the creator of the Hard Rock Café logo.

== Honours and awards ==
A retrospective Alan Aldridge – the Man with the Kaleidoscope Eyes featured at the Design Museum in London from 10 October 2008 to 25 January 2009, and was reviewed as "The trip of a lifetime".

Over the years Aldridge won many awards for his work, among them Whitbread Children's Book Award (1973).

== Selected works ==
- Cover for Boswell's London Journal 1762–1763, ed. Frederick Pottle, Penguin (1966).
- Cover design for A Quick One by The Who (1966).
- Poster for Andy Warhol and Paul Morrissey's film Chelsea Girls (1966).
- Covers for Penguin Science Fiction books (1967).
- Cover design for Under the Jasmin Tree by the Modern Jazz Quartet (1968).
- The Beatles Illustrated Lyrics (US, Houghton Mifflin; UK, MacDonald Unit 75, 1969) editor, select illustrations including the original design for the Rolling Stones Tongue and Lips logo.
- Ann in the Moon (1970), with story by Frances D. Francis.
- The Penguin Book of Comics (1971), with George Perry, published by Penguin Books.
- The Ship's Cat (1977), illustrated in collaboration with Harry Willock, with verses by Richard Adams.
- The Peacock Party (1979) and The Lion's Cavalcade (1980), sequels to The Butterfly Ball, based on anonymous sequels to Roscoe's version with verses by George E. Ryder and Ted Walker respectively. Illustrated in collaboration with Harry Willock.
- Phantasia: Of Docklands, Rocklands and Dodos (1981)
- The Gnole (1999), with Steve Boyett (writer) and Maxine Miller (colorist).
- Illustrations and logo design for Everybody Loves a Happy Ending, the sixth studio album by British pop rock/new wave band Tears for Fears, 2004.
- Aldridge is also credited for Art Direction and Illustration on Light Grenades (2006), the sixth studio album for Incubus.
- The Man with Kaleidoscope Eyes (Thames & Hudson, 2008), 240 pp, ISBN 978-0-500-09342-9; also published as The Man with Kaleidoscope Eyes: The Art of Alan Aldridge (Abrams Books, 2009), 240 pp, ISBN 978-0-8109-0596-2
