= Paul Marshall (investor) =

British investor (born 1959)

Sir Paul Marshall
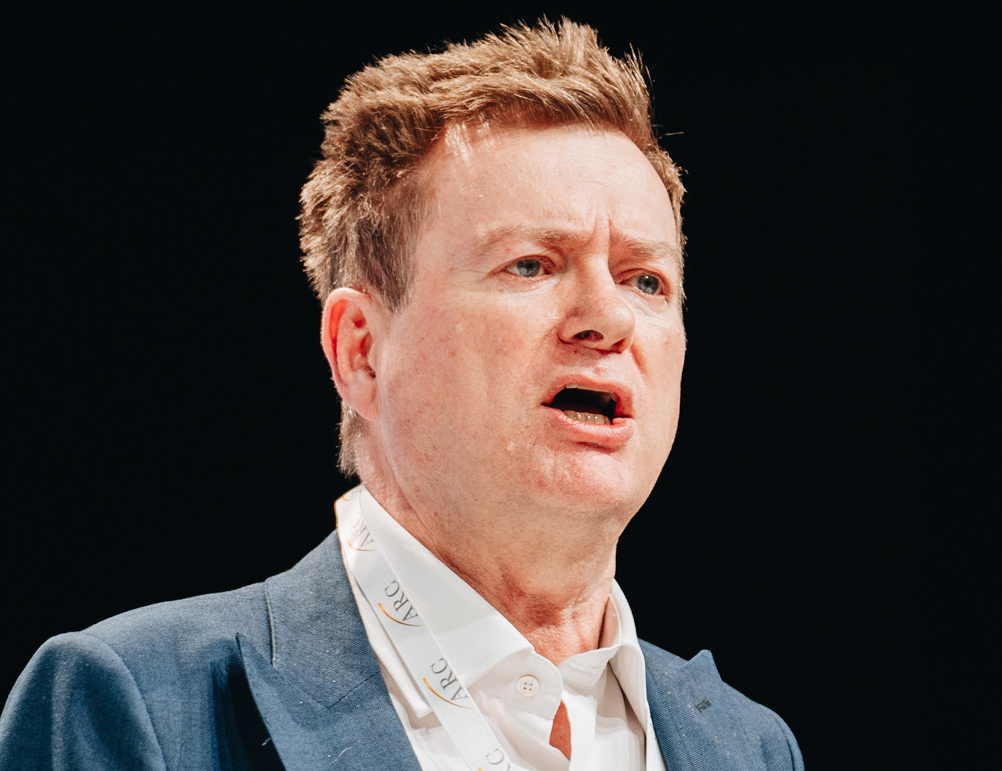
- Marshall in 2023
- Born: Paul Roderick Clucas Marshall; 2 August 1959 (age 67); Ealing, London, England
- Education: Merchant Taylors' School, Northwood
- Alma mater: St John's College, Oxford; INSEAD
- Occupation: Hedge fund manager
- Known for: Owner of GB News, UnHerd and The Spectator; Co-founder of Marshall Wace Asset Management
- Spouse: Sabina de Balkany
- Children: 2, including Winston
- Relatives: Penny Marshall (sister)
- Awards: Knight bachelor

Sir Paul Roderick Clucas Marshall (born 2 August 1959) is a British hedge fund manager, philanthropist, and media baron. He is the owner of UnHerd and The Spectator, and co-owner of GB News. According to the Sunday Times Rich List, he had an estimated net worth of £875 million in 2024, up from £630 million in 2020. In 2024, he topped The Sunday Times Giving List, having donated £145.1 million over 12 months to various charities, including a £50 million donation to the London School of Economics for the eponymous Marshall Institute.

Marshall was a member and donor of the Liberal Democrats, and in 2004 co-edited the influential Orange Book. In 2015, he left the party due to his support for Brexit, and subsequently donated to the Brexit campaign and the Conservative Party. His ownership of UnHerd and GB News led the New Statesman to name him as one of the most powerful right-wing figures in the UK in 2023, before his 2024 acquisition of The Spectator. The Financial Times described him as "an enthusiastic combatant in the UK's own version of America's culture wars".

He was knighted in the 2016 Birthday Honours "for services to Education and Philanthropy".

== Early life and education ==
Paul Roderick Clucas Marshall was born on 2 August 1959 in Ealing, London, England, the son of Alan Marshall, managing director of the Philippine Refining Company (later Unilever Philippines), and Mary Sylvia Clucas. His sister is the journalist Penny Marshall.

When his parents moved to the Philippines and then South Africa for his father's job with Unilever, Marshall boarded at Merchant Taylors' School, in Northwood, London. He boarded in the Manor of the Rose while at the school.

From there he went to St John's College, Oxford, to read History and Modern Languages, and subsequently took an MBA from INSEAD business school in Fontainebleau, France.

== Career ==
Marshall co-founded Marshall Wace LLP, now one of Europe's largest hedge fund groups, in 1997 together with financier Ian Wace, and serves as chairman of the company. At the time of its founding, Marshall Wace was one of the first hedge funds in London. The company started with $50 million, half of which was from George Soros, and the other half from family and friends.

Funds managed by Marshall Wace have won multiple investment awards and the company has become one of the world's leading managers of equity long/short strategies. Marshall Wace manages over $50 billion and has offices globally. Prior to founding Marshall Wace, Marshall worked for Mercury Asset Management, the fund management arm of S. G. Warburg & Co.

Marshall was lead non-executive director at the Department for Education with responsibility for the Union from 2013 to 2016.

He is a member of the Hedge Fund Standards Board.

== Politics ==
=== Liberal Democrats ===
Marshall had a longstanding involvement with Britain's Liberal Democrats party. He was a research assistant to Charles Kennedy, former leader of the Liberal Democrats in 1985 and stood for Parliament for the SDP–Liberal Alliance in Fulham in 1987. He has made appearances on current affairs programmes such as BBC Radio 4's Any Questions?.

In 2004, Marshall co-edited The Orange Book with David Laws. Chapters were written by various upcoming Liberal Democrat politicians including Nick Clegg, Chris Huhne, Vince Cable, Ed Davey and Susan Kramer (neither Clegg, Huhne nor Kramer were MPs at the time). Laws, describing the pair's ambition in publishing The Orange Book, wrote "We were proud of the liberal philosophical heritage of our party. But we both felt that this philosophical grounding was in danger of being neglected in favour of no more than 'a philosophy of good intentions, bobbing about unanchored in the muddled middle of British politics'" The book attracted initial controversy when launched, but both it and the term Orange Bookers to describe those sympathetic to its outlook continue to be frequently referenced to describe a strand of thought within the Liberal Democrats.

In 2005, Marshall gave £1 million to the Liberal Democrat-aligned think tank Centre for Reform. Between 2002 and 2015, he donated £200,000 to the party itself.

In 2006, Marshall told The Daily Telegraph: "I decided to devote a lot of time to the Lib Dems because I think there is a very high probability they will be in overall control in the next parliament." He expressed concern that his spending would be equated with political influence: "Money is a major disadvantage in British politics [...] I just want to participate in a political process, a battle of ideas, in a one-member, one-vote party. I have one vote, like everybody else, and I also want my ideas to be influential." The Telegraph reported that Liberal Democrat advisers referred to him as "moneybags".

In 2007, Marshall paid for a campaigner for Nick Clegg's ultimately successful leadership campaign. By 2021, he described Clegg as among those who are "progressives" and "not traditional liberals in any understanding of the term".

During the 2010–2015 Cameron–Clegg coalition, Marshall supported the austerity programme and called for deeper cuts. In 2010, Marshall was one of four involved in formal talks on the future direction of the coalition, representing the Liberal Democrats alongside David Laws, Chris Huhne and political adviser Julian Astle. Over the course of the coalition government, Marshall became an ally of education secretary Michael Gove and grew more favourable to the Conservative Party. From 2015, he turned away from the Liberal Democrats in disagreement with their support for remaining in the European Union.

=== Brexit and the Conservative Party ===
Marshall was a public supporter of Brexit during the European Union membership referendum in 2016. He gave a donation of £100,000 to the Leave campaign.

In April 2017, Marshall told the Financial Times that his reasons for backing Brexit were a commitment to free trade, as he considered the EU overly protectionist, opposition to Angela Merkel's immigration policy and opposition to the Euro single currency, which he said was a "flawed concept" that had hurt Southern European countries. The Financial Times said this his opposition to the EU stemmed in part from its post-2008 financial regulation, which Marshall described in 2016 as "an onslaught". Marshall also said: "Most people in Britain do not want to become part of a very large country called Europe. They want to be part of a country called Britain." That month, Marshall organised a Prosperity Conference on the UK exiting the European Union, writing for BrexitCentral: "This is a huge opportunity for the UK. Our ambition is that the UK should be a champion of free trade, open and outward looking to the world and built on strong institutions."

Marshall donated £3,250 to Michael Gove's Conservative Party leadership campaign in July 2016, and in 2019 gave £500,000 to the Conservative Party. Between 2020 and 2023, Marshall gave £890,000 to the conservative think tank Policy Exchange.

=== Right-wing media ownership ===
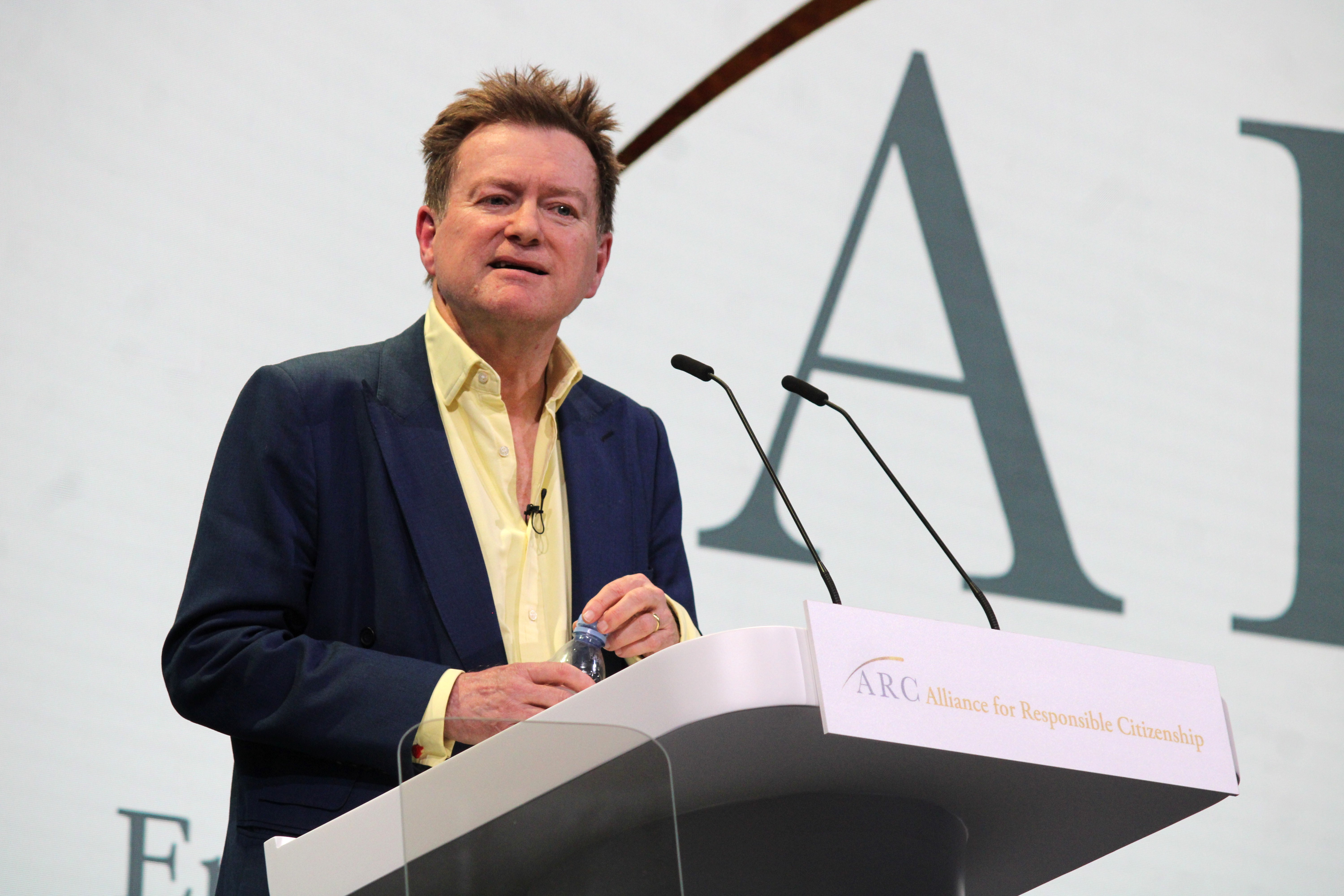
Marshall speaking at the Alliance for Responsible Citizenship, London, 2025

In 2017, Marshall gave funding to the political news website UnHerd.

In 2020–2021, Marshall invested £10 million into the political entertainment and opinion channel GB News. Following the resignation of Andrew Neil in September 2021, Marshall temporarily replaced him as chairman, before being succeeded by Alan McCormick in April 2022. GB News made losses of £30.7 million in 2021–22, £42.4 million in 2022–23, £33.4 million in 2023–24, and £26.2 million in 2024–25. Marshall and its other owners have provided the company with further funding to cover its consistent losses, which as of 2025 reached £132 million in total.

In 2023, Marshall gave £1 million to create the Alliance for Responsible Citizenship, an organisation associated with Jordan Peterson and Baroness Stroud, and gave a keynote address at its first conference in October–November 2023. Until 2025 he was its only known donor.

In September 2024, Marshall bought The Spectator magazine for £100 million, more than double the £40m valuation given by media analysts, after a bidding war against Rupert Murdoch. His takeover prompted Andrew Neil to resign immediately as chairman, having previously said that hedge fund managers should not own newspapers due to potential conflicts of interest. Long-standing Marshall ally Michael Gove was appointed editor, replacing Fraser Nelson. One week earlier, Nelson had told the British Society of Magazine Editors that he expected to have little contact with Marshall, and that editors should "actively ignore" suggestions from owners, adding: "If you get sacked for it, you get sacked for it – but you hold the line. Famous last words."

Nic Newman of the Reuters Institute for the Study of Journalism had previously said in June 2024 that Marshall's media acquisitions highlighted "concern that news media are increasingly being viewed as a way to buy political influence". Matt Walsh, head of the journalism school at Cardiff University, noted in 2025 that while Murdoch used his media to build wealth, Marshall was already wealthy before his media acquisitions, and uses his mostly loss-making outlets for political influence.

In May 2025, Marshall called for the BBC to be sold or broken up, calling it "an embodiment of anti-competitive market distortion" and "the propaganda arm of the state". He also called for its fact-checking service to be shut down. Marshall was speaking at the Pharos Foundation, an Oxford education charity that he provided with £350,000 of funding in 2023. A BBC spokesperson responded that the BBC is the most trusted news provider in the UK, and Alan Rusbridger noted that the BBC's trust ratings are much stronger than those of Marshall's own GB News (+23, according to YouGov, versus -15 for the GB News, and 62% according to the Reuters Institute, compared to 29% for GB News). Rusbridger asked rhetorically: "Are all these people who trust the BBC's approach to journalism deluded? Is Marshall the only one who can see clearly?"

=== Engagement with far-right Twitter content ===
In February 2024 the advocacy group Hope not Hate called attention to Marshall's activity on his private Twitter account, on which he had almost 5,000 followers, including MPs and journalists. He had liked tweets from far right and conspiracy accounts which called for "mass expulsions" of immigrants, which contained climate denialism (claiming there is "no definitive scientific proof" that CO2 emissions cause global warming), and which predicted civil war "once the Muslims get to 15–20%". Other tweets referred to Muslim immigration as "infiltration" that would lead to "the establishment of a totalitarian Islamic theocracy", and advocated believing in God because "the other side" is "so committed to worshipping Satan, evil, homosexuality and corrupting children". One of his own tweets, referring to an interfaith ceremony conducted in a French church, said that the Christian church "has its useful idiots".

Alan Rusbridger, former editor of The Guardian, said these "hateful 'likes' make him unfit to be a media mogul". Ark Schools defended him in a statement after he was criticised by local Labour MP Sam Tarry, though he later resigned as chair and trustee of Ark Schools (remaining a trustee of Ark Charity). A spokesperson for Marshall responded that "This sample [of tweets] does not represent his views". Every tweet and almost 300 likes were subsequently removed from his Twitter account. Premier Christianity magazine quoted a friend who said that Marshall is "very repentant".

== Philanthropy ==
According to the Sunday Times Giving List in 2020, Marshall donated £106.8 million to charitable causes in 2019. In the 2023 iteration of the Sunday Times Giving List, Marshall was listed as the fourth-highest donor, donating 8.36% of his wealth.

=== Education ===
Marshall was the founder, and chairs the board of trustees, of the independent research institute the Education Policy Institute (EPI). For more than a decade he also chaired EPI's predecessor think tank, CentreForum.

He is a founding trustee of children's charity ARK, and former chairman of Ark Schools, which is one of Britain's leading providers of academies and has also played a role in developing new programmes for inner city education. Other initiatives spun out of ARK include Future Leaders, Teaching Leaders, Maths Mastery, English Mastery, Science Mastery, Frontline and Now Teach. He is also a founding trustee of the charity Every Child a Chance.

In April 2024, he stood down as chair and trustee of Ark Schools to focus on "other philanthropic and business commitments" after being accused of liking and sharing far-right extremist social media posts and conspiracy theories. However, Ark Schools said he had "indicated earlier in the year his intention to step down from the Ark Schools Board". He has remained a trustee of ARK.

Marshall has also been a major supporter of Ralston College in Savannah, Georgia, which launched in 2022.

==== The Marshall Institute ====
In April 2015, it was announced that Marshall would donate £30 million to the London School of Economics to establish the Marshall Institute for Philanthropy and Social Entrepreneurship, alongside Sir Thomas Hughes-Hallett. Marshall and Hughes-Hallett had previously collaborated on the Philanthropy Review, where they identified a lack of comprehensive research into the efficacy of private contributions to public welfare. Their vision was to create a "world-class centre of teaching" to fill that gap by advancing research into enhancing philanthropic impact, studying how charities can be more effective, and nurturing the next generation of philanthropic experts.

In 2017, the Marshall Institute launched an MSc in Social Business and Entrepreneurship.

In 2021, Marshall donated an additional £50 million to the Marshall Institute to establish the Marshall Impact Accelerator to "provide a new platform for scaling promising social ventures to help tackle global challenges."

== Publications ==
Marshall has written widely about education. In 2012, he edited a book on improving the education system called The Tail: how England's schools fail one child in five – and what can be done. Contributors included Labour MP Frank Field, Professor Chris Husbands of the Institute of Education and Stephen Machin of the London School of Economics. He is also co-author of Aiming Higher: a better future for England's schools with Jennifer Moses (2006), and author of Tackling Educational Inequality (with Sumi Rabindrakumar and Lucy Wilkins, 2007).

Marshall's other publications include: The Market Failures Review (Editor – 1999), Britain After Blair (co-editor with Julian Astle, David Laws, Alasdair Murray) and Football and the Big Society (with Sam Tomlin, 2011).

In 2020, he published 10½ Lessons from Experience: Perspectives on Fund Management, a personal reflection on lessons learned from a career in fund management. The Times described the book as "a bit of a gem" and a Bloomberg review welcomed its examination of cognitive bias, the use of data and systematic strategies by successful fund managers. Marshall wrote, "Machines have not won yet. Machines typically do not fare well in a crisis. They are not good at responding to a new paradigm until the rules of the new paradigm are plugged into them by a human."

== Personal life ==
Marshall is married to Sabina de Balkany, a French national, who owns an antique shop on the King's Road in Chelsea. Marshall is father of former Mumford & Sons band member Winston Marshall and classically trained musician Giovanna Marshall.

He describes himself as a "committed Church of England Christian". He attends Holy Trinity Brompton, an influential evangelical church in Knightsbridge known for its wealthy congregation. The Church Times describes him as "a key figure in Conservative Christian circles in the UK". He was a founding member and donor of the St Mellitus College, and sits on the board of St Paul's Theological Centre. Marshall has given at least £10 million to the Church Revitalisation Trust to plant new churches in the Holy Trinity Brompton network, which as of 2024 has over 100 churches. A source inside the CRT described it as "promoting an evangelical agenda to the masses", and as an "antidote" to the "liberal wokery" of the Church of England.

=== Political views ===
He describes himself as a classical liberal. The Financial Times described his ownership of GB News and creation of the ARC Conference as a turn towards right-wing politics, and said that Marshall's politics had been "called into question" by his liking and retweeting of far-right content on Twitter.

In 2021, Marshall wrote that liberalism had "lost its moorings". Where classical liberalism had, in his view, been grounded in Christian faith, these roots had been "poisoned" when Enlightenment ideas diverged from the Christian worldview. He contrasted the Christian belief in fallenness against the Enlightenment belief in rationality and progress. Furthermore, he argued that the empiricism of David Hume and Adam Smith was compatible with this Christian belief, but recalled the views of Friedrich Hayek, who he said claimed that the "rationalist epistemology" of René Descartes and Jean-Jacques Rousseau could lead to "totalitarian democracy".

Media offices
Preceded by Andrew Neil	Chairman of GB News; Acting; 2021–2022	Succeeded by Alan McCormick
