= Standards Board for Alternative Investments =

International standard-setting body

- Abbreviation: SBAI
- Formation: January 2008; 18 years ago
- Type: Nonprofit
- Purpose: Setting standards
- Headquarters: London
- Location: Somerset House, New Wing, Strand
- Fields: Alternative investment
- Chairman: Amelia Fawcett
- Website: www.sbai.org
- Formerly called: Hedge Fund Standards Board (HFSB)

The Standards Board for Alternative Investments (SBAI), formerly known as the Hedge Fund Standards Board, is an international standard-setting body for the alternative investment industry and sets the voluntary standard of best practices and practices endorsed by its members. Its primary role is to be the custodian of the Alternative Investment Standards (formerly known as "the Standards"), which are designed to create a "framework of transparency, integrity and good governance" in the way the hedge fund industry operates.

== History ==
The SBAI originated in June 2007, when a group of leading alternative investment managers formed the Hedge Fund Working Group to develop industry standards in areas such as disclosure, valuation, risk management, governance, and shareholder conduct. Founding firms included Marshall Wace, Cheyne Capital Management, Man Group, and CQS. In January 2008, the working group was established as a nonprofit, called the Hedge Fund Standards Board (HFSB). Its primary purpose was to oversee what's called the "Standards" (now known as the "Alternative Investment Standards"). At its inception, the board had 14 leading hedge fund managers and was chaired by Sir Andrew Large to develop the standards. By 2016 it had almost 200 hedge fund managers and institutional investors as members; the total assets under management of all members was $3 trillion. In 2014, the board became an affiliate member of the International Organization of Securities Commissions (IOSCO) and in 2016 established mutual observer relationship with the International Forum of Sovereign Wealth Funds.

In July 2011, Dame Amelia Fawcett was appointed Chair of the SBAI, replacing Andrew Large. In 2014, SBAI became an affiliate member of International Organization of Securities Commissions (IOSCO) and in 2016 SBAI and International Forum of Sovereign Wealth Funds (IFSWF) agreed to engage in mutual observership.

In September 2017, the board announced that it was changing its name from HFSB to the SBAI or Standards Board for Alternative Investments (SBAI) to "reflect the evolution of the industry". Specifically, it noted that "managers increasingly offer their investment strategies through a variety of vehicles beyond 'hedge funds', including liquid alternatives, regulated funds, co-investment vehicles, drawdown funds, and managed accounts" while at the same time moving away from "hedge fund" as a term in order to "classify and integrate a diverse array of alternatives strategies by underlying asset class, return profile, market exposure, or liquidity".

== See also ==
- Alternative investment
- Managed Funds Association
- Standards organization
