= Ian Wace =

British financier (born 1963)

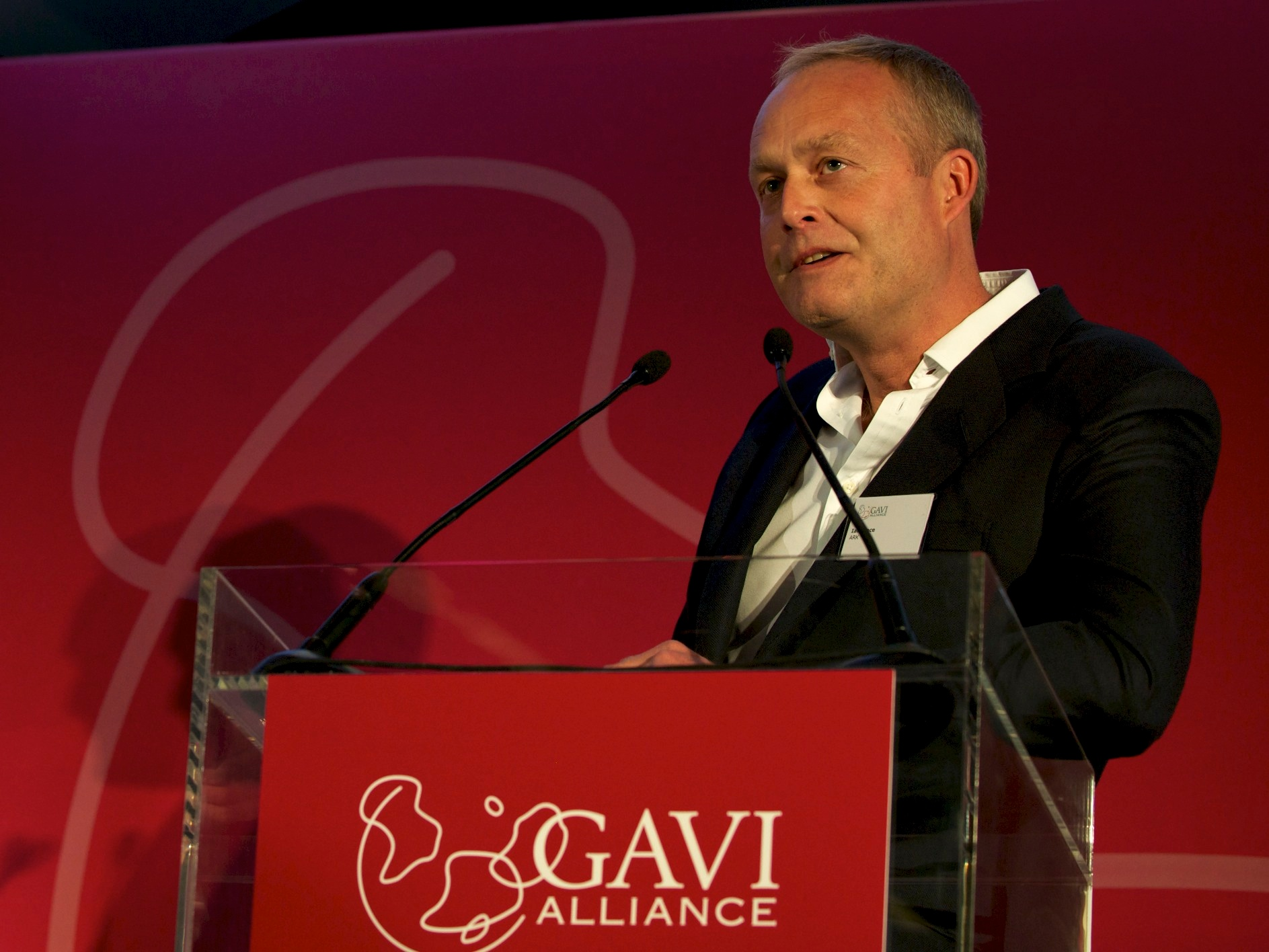
- Wace in 2011
- Born: January 1963 (age 63)
- Occupation: Financier
- Known for: Co-founder and CEO of Marshall Wace Asset Management
- Spouse(s): Joanne Wace (died 1994) Fiona Hardy (m. 1996; div. 2010) Saffron Aldridge (m. 2012, divorced)
- Children: 4 (2 deceased)
- Relatives: Charles Wace (brother)

Ian Gerald Patrick Wace (born January 1963) is a British financier who co-founded Marshall Wace Asset Management, a London-based hedge fund with Paul Marshall in 1997. He and Marshall, along with another hedge fund manager Arpad Busson, co-founded a children's non-profit, Absolute Return for Kids (ARK) in 2001.

== Early life ==
Ian Gerald Patrick Wace was born in January 1963. His brother Charles Wace is CEO of global television production company Twofour Group. He does not have a college degree; Institutional Investor called him "perhaps the only person without a college degree to ever qualify for the Rich List".

== Career ==
Wace worked for 11 years at S. G. Warburg & Co., where he became its youngest director ever, at age 25. He was appointed head of European equity sales in 1988, head of proprietary trading in 1993, and head of international trading in 1994. In 1995, he joined Deutsche Morgan Grenfell as its head of equity and derivative trading.

In 1997, he and Paul Marshall co-founded the hedge fund, Marshall Wace, which they continue to run; Wace is the CEO and chief risk officer, and Marshall is the chairman and chief investment officer. In September 2015, they announced a long-term strategic partnership with private equity firm Kohlberg Kravis Roberts (KKR), which acquired a 24.9% stake in Marshall Wace, which they increased to 29.9% in November 2017.

In 2016, Institutional Investor named Marshall Wace the "best-performing hedge fund in 2015", which manages $22 billion in client money.

According to The Sunday Times Rich List in 2020, Wace is worth £630 million.

== Political and philanthropic activity ==
Wace donated £300,000 to the Conservative Party in the 2019 United Kingdom general election.

In 2001, he joined with his partner Paul Marshall and Arpad Busson, another hedge fund manager, to try to address the plight of Romanian orphans in 2001. They founded Absolute Return for Kids (ARK), a children's non-profit.

== Personal life ==
In September 1994, Wace saw his family, following him in another car, killed in a road crash in Hampshire. His first wife Joanne, 34, and their two children, four-year-old son Guy and 11-month daughter Alicia were killed. in September 1996 he married Fiona Hardy and they had two children Claudia and Luke; they split in 2010. In 2012, he married the model Saffron Aldridge. They separated in 2023 and subsequently divorced.

In June 2017, he purchased Tanera Mòr, the largest of the Summer Isles off the northwest highlands of Scotland, for £1.7 million, far less than the £2.5 million asking price when it was put on the market in 2013. Wace planned a four-year development to Tanera Mòr to become an "idyllic retreat capable of hosting up to 60 paying guests".

He is dyslexic.
