= Laura Lyons =

American model (born 1954)

Playboy centerfold appearance
- February 1976
- Preceded by: Daina House
- Succeeded by: Ann Pennington

Personal details
- Born: October 22, 1954 (age 71) Los Angeles, California, United States
- Height: 5 ft 5 in (1.65 m)

Laura Lyons (born October 22, 1954) is an American model. She was Playboy magazine's Playmate of the Month for its February 1976 issue. Her centerfold was photographed by Dwight Hooker and Mario Casilli.

Sherlock Holmes fans speculated that Lyons was named after a character in The Hound of the Baskervilles, but Hugh Hefner confirmed it was indeed her real name in an interview in The Baker Street Journal.

Lyons was born in Los Angeles, California. She worked as a Playboy Bunny in the Chicago Playboy Club prior to becoming a Playmate, and led a protest and brief strike seeking improved work privileges such as the freedom to date customers and socialize at the club when not working, which were granted.

She landed a few acting roles in the 1970s, including an uncredited spot in The Godfather Part II (1974) and a role in the British-Mexican shark thriller Tintorera (1977).

She is part Italian, and her daughter is Victoria's Secret model Lily Aldridge. Her other daughter, Ruby Aldridge, is also a model.

Daina House	Laura Lyons	Ann Pennington	Denise Michele	Patricia McClain	Debra Peterson
Deborah Borkman	Linda Beatty	Whitney Kaine	Hope Olson	Patti McGuire	Karen Hafter
