= EIM Group =

EIM Group (Egyptian International Motors), established in 1979 is one of Egypt’s largest privately owned entities. EIM is the main business arm in the automotive industry of its parent company Alkan Group. EIM Group operates in several sectors, which includes servicing and distribution of automotive vehicles, as well as the manufacturing of earth moving apparatus, utility passenger motor vehicles and marine to power equipment. Eim Group is headquartered Mokattam, Cairo and is in partnership with Renault Egypt.

Since 2006, the Egyptian International Trading & Agencies Co. established themselves as the sole distributor of Kia Motors in Egypt, which became a subsidiary of EIM Group.

== Alkan Group ==
Alkan Group was established in 1974 by Mohammed Mahoud Nosseir (chairman). The group consists of thirteen sister companies, which range from IT solutions and system integrators to finance, investment consultancy and industrial spinning of cotton yarns.
