= Charles David (company) =

American fashion company

Charles David of California
- Company type: Private
- Genre: Retailer
- Founded: 1970s
- Founder: David Malka and Charles Malka
- Headquarters: Los Angeles, California, United States
- Products: Shoes

Charles David is an American fashion company known for their design of shoes, founded by David and Charles Malka.

== History and operations ==
The family-owned company was founded by David and Charles Malka. It began Canadian distribution of shoes in the 1970s, followed by the U.S. distribution of European shoes in 1987. Their first retail store opened at the Côte-des-Neiges Plaza in Montreal, Quebec, Canada in the early 1970s. They opened and operated several chains in Canada until they moved their operations to Los Angeles, California in 1988.

In the spring of 2004, Charles David launched their lower price lines, Charles by Charles David and Exchange by Charles David. In 2005, they had 25 retail stores across the U.S., in Arizona, California, Florida, Illinois, Massachusetts, New Jersey, and Pennsylvania. They also sell handbags and their shoes are carried in department and specialty stores nationwide, such as Nordstrom, Dillard's, and Bloomingdale's.

Charles David shoes have been worn by celebrities such as Debra Messing, Eva Longoria, Jessica Simpson, Halle Berry, and longtime fan Emmanuelle Chriqui. Actress Natalie Portman was a fan of Charles by Charles David's Vegan collection, launched in 2011, and wore many of their shoes to premieres and appearances throughout the release of Black Swan.

In February 2013, the company launched its first campaign featuring a celebrity spokesmodel, actress Emmanuelle Chriqui, a longtime fan of the brand. The company also announced a future collaboration with Emmanuelle - a capsule collection for release in fall 2013. The collection, Charles David by Emmanuelle Chriqui, featured several styles designed by the actress.

In December 2013, according to The Sage Group, Charles David's financial adviser, New York Transit, Inc. has bought Charles David of California Inc.

== Brands ==
- Charles David - women's footwear and accessories
- Charles David "Made in Italy" - women's footwear made exclusively in Italy, consisting mostly of leather boots and booties
- Charles by Charles David - women's footwear (lower price label)
- Exchange by Charles David
- Charles David by Emmanuelle Chriqui - capsule collection designed by actress Emmanuelle Chriqui
