= John Bancroft (architect) =

British architect

- Born: 28 October 1928; Nottinghamshire
- Died: 29 August 2011 (aged 82); UK
- Occupation: Architect
- Practice: Greater London Council
- Buildings: Pimlico School

John Bancroft (28 October 1928 – 29 August 2011) was a British architect noted for his Brutalist designs for the Greater London Council (GLC).

He joined the Architects’ Department of the GLC in 1957 and led the project to build Pimlico School from 1964 to 1970. The building was demolished in 2010 by Westminster City Council.

Bancroft explained the design of the school in a 2008 interview: "I wanted pupils to feel they were part of a community... So I divided the place up into a form of glass screen so you would get views down from the level you were at into the other parts of the school. And also I wanted to make sure that you could from time to time glimpse the outside so that you would know where you were in the great surrounding community that Pimlico is, and the buildings surrounding it"

His other school designs include the Elfrida Rathbone Girls' School in Camden and the Philippa Fawcett Teacher Training College in Streatham.

Bancroft was a staunch defender of the GLC's unpopular Brutalist landmarks. Though he did not design it, he argued that the County Hall Island Block, vacant for 20 years, should have been listed as an early example of open plan office architecture and expressed himself "quite horrified" by the demolition of Pimlico School. Bancroft devoted much of his career to building conservation and was an active member of the Twentieth Century Society, the Victorian Society and a supporter of the charity Docomomo.
