= Marshall Wace =

British hedge fund

- Type: LLP
- Industry: Financial services
- Founded: 1997; 29 years ago
- Founders: • Paul Marshall (CIO & Chairman); • Ian Wace (CEO & chief risk officer)
- Headquarters: London, United Kingdom
- Products: Investment products
- AUM: US$ 82.1 billion (as of November 2024)
- Website: www.mwam.com

Marshall Wace LLP is a British hedge fund headquartered in London, England, founded by Paul Marshall and Ian Wace in 1997. Marshall serves as chairman and chief investment officer, and Wace as a chief executive officer & chief risk officer. The company is recognised as one of the world's largest hedge fund managers.

== History ==
Before starting the fund, Paul Marshall was Head of European Equities at Mercury Asset Management, whilst Ian Wace was Head of Equities Trading at Deutsche Bank. In 1997, Marshall and Wace launched Marshall Wace; they were managing $50 million — $25 million from George Soros and $25 million sourced via family and friends.

In August 2014, Marshall Wace made $36 million from going short on the collapse of the Portuguese bank Banco Espírito Santo.

In 2015 Kohlberg Kravis Roberts agreed to buy a 24.9 percent stake in Marshall Wace.

In 2020, Marshall Wace announced its plans to raise $1 billion for a new green hedge fund which will depend on the environmental and ethical attributes for trading stocks.

In December 2023, the company reported revenues of £1.2 billion in the year ending February 2023, down from £1.5 billion on the previous year. Profits amounted to £538 million which was shared between 26 partners of the company.

== Operations ==
Marshall Wace manages several long-short equity funds.

The firm manages more than $64 billion as of January 2022 and operates from fund management offices in London, New York, Hong Kong, Shanghai, and Singapore. The head office in London is situated on Sloane Street.

The company is a founding member of the Hedge Fund Standards Board (HFSB) and a member of the Alternative Investment Management Association (AIMA).

== Products ==
Marshall Wace runs a proprietary alpha capture system TOPS (Trade Optimised Portfolio System), which polls the investment ideas of equity sell-side practitioners (generalists, sector specialists, strategists, and economists) around the world and uses algorithms to analyse and optimise this information into liquid equity portfolios. The company's funds include UCITS-compliant vehicles.

Year	AUM, Billion USD$
1997	.05
2006	4.3
2007	11
2008	15
2009	6.3
2010	6
2014	18
2015	22
2016	25
2017	29
2019	39
2020	43.8
2021	54.2
2022	44.5
2023	59
2024	82.1
