= List of L'Officiel cover models =

Cover of the December 1993 issue with Claudia Schiffer

This list of L'Officiel cover models (1921–present) is a catalog of cover models who have appeared on the cover of the French fashion magazine L'Officiel.

== 1920s ==
=== 1921 ===
Issue	Cover model	Photographer/Illustrator	Ref.
July	—N/a		
5 August	—N/a		
№3	—N/a		
15 September		Delphi	
15 December	Madeleine Soria	Delphi	

=== 1922 ===
Issue	Cover model	Photographer/Illustrator	Ref.
15 January		Delphi	
15 February	Illustration of Jeanne Lanvin, Marguerite Lanvin		
15 March			
15 April	—N/a		
15 May			
15 June	Véra Sergine		
15 July		Henri Manuel	
August	—N/a		
September			
15 October–15 November		Henri Manuel	
15 November–15 December	—N/a		
15 December–15 January 1923	Véra Sergine	G.L. Manuel Fréres	

=== 1923 ===
Issue	Cover model	Photographer/Illustrator	Ref.
15 January–15 February	—N/a		
15 February–15 March		Boris Lipnitzki	
15 March–15 April	—N/a		
15 April–15 May	—N/a		
15 May–15 June	Jane Renouardt	Madame D'Ora	
15 June–15 July	Nany Payne	Madame D'Ora	
15 July–15 August	Madge Derny	O'Doyé	
15 August–15 September	Andrée Fontenelle		
15 September–15 October	—N/a		
15 October–15 November	—N/a		
15 November–15 December	—N/a		

=== 1924 ===
Issue	Cover model	Illustrator	Ref.
July	—N/a		
August	—N/a		
September	—N/a		
October	—N/a		
November	—N/a		
December	—N/a		

=== 1925 ===
Issue	Cover model	Photographer/Illustrator	Ref.
January	—N/a		
February	—N/a		
March	—N/a		
April	—N/a		
May	—N/a		
June	—N/a		
July	—N/a		
August	—N/a		
September	—N/a	Treichler	
October	—N/a		
November	Andrée Spinelly	Madame D'Ora	
December	Charlotte Revyl	Madame D'Ora	

=== 1926 ===
Issue	Cover model	Photographer/Illustrator	Ref.
January	Mademoiselle O.P.	Madame D'Ora	
February	Anna Pavlova	Madame D'Ora	
March	Countess Ghislain de Maigret	Madame D'Ora	
April		Madame D'Ora	
May	Madeleine Soria	Madame D'Ora	
June	Madame Agnès	Madame D'Ora	
July	Dora Duby		
August		Madame D'Ora	
September	Mademoiselle Falconetti	G.L. Manuel Fréres	
October	Princess Volkonsky	Egidio Scaioni	
November	J. Suzanne Talbot	Madame D'Ora	
December	Andrée Spinelly	Madame D'Ora	

=== 1927 ===
Issue	Cover model	Photographer	Ref.
January	Marjorie Moss	Madame D'Ora	
February		Madame D'Ora	
March		Madame D'Ora	
April	Jenny Golder	Madame D'Ora	
May	Madame Agnès	Madame D'Ora	
June	One of the Sisters G	Madame D'Ora	
July	Olga Poufkinne	Madame D'Ora	
August	Marguerite Jamois	Madame D'Ora	
September	Pauline Rowe, Betty Rowe	Madame D'Ora	
October	Hélène Ostrowski	Madame D'Ora	
November	Baroness Fouquier	Madame D'Ora	
December	Ganna Walska	Madame D'Ora	

=== 1928 ===
Issue	Cover model	Photographer	Ref.
January	Mistinguett	Madame D'Ora	
February	Madame Agnès	Madame D'Ora	
March	Mademoiselle de Rowera	Madame D'Ora	
April	Danièle Brégis	Madame D'Ora	
May	Margaret Bannerman	Madame D'Ora	
June	Lili Damita	Madame D'Ora	
July	Mademoiselle Marcelle	Madame D'Ora	
August	Madame Rosnauer	Madame D'Ora	
September	Emmy Lynn	Madame D'Ora	
№86			
November	Hélène Ostowski		
December	Michelle S	Madame D'Ora	

=== 1929 ===
Issue	Cover model	Photographer	Ref.
January	Arletty	Madame D'Ora	
February	Madame Brewster	Madame D'Ora	
March	Madame Denay	Madame D'Ora	
April	Nicole Groult	Madame D'Ora	
May	Elsa Schiaparelli	Madame D'Ora	
June	Princess Jean-Louise de Faucigny-Lucinges	Madame D'Ora	
July	Madame de Gramajos	Madame D'Ora	
August	Senta Saravasti	Madame D'Ora	
September	Lady Abdy	Madame D'Ora	
October	Margaret Douglass	Madame D'Ora	
November	Mademoiselle S. Knudsen	Madame D'Ora	
December			

== 1930s ==
=== 1930 ===
Issue	Cover model	Photographer	Ref.
January		Madame D'Ora	
February	Madame le Monnier	Madame D'Ora	
March	Charlotte Revyl	Madame D'Ora	
April	J. Suzanne Talbot	Madame D'Ora	
May	Florence Walton	Madame D'Ora	
June	Mademoiselle O.	Madame D'Ora	
July	Madame Agnès	Madame D'Ora	
August	The Marquise of Saint-Sauveur	Madame D'Ora	
September	Madame Boissevain	Madame D'Ora	
October	Louise Eisner	Madame D'Ora	
November	Madame E. C.	Madame D'Ora	
December	Mademoiselle Mado	Madame D'Ora	

=== 1931 ===
Issue	Cover model	Photographer/Illustrator	Ref.
January	Gaby Mono	Madame D'Ora	
February	Mademoiselle Delubac	Madame D'Ora	
March	Mila Cirul	Madame D'Ora	
April	Rosine Deréan	Madame D'Ora	
May	—N/a	Jean Dunand	
June	Madame Fernande Léon	Madame D'Ora	
July	Madame François de Yturbe	Madame D'Ora	
August		Madame D'Ora	
September		Madame D'Ora	
October	Simone	Madame D'Ora	
November	Anny Ondra	Madame D'Ora	
December	Madame G. Mouton	Madame D'Ora	

=== 1932 ===
Issue	Cover model	Photographer/Illustrator	Ref.
January	Comtesse de la Falaise	Madame D'Ora	
February	Madame Ruffo-Proven	Madame D'Ora	
March	Madame Robertson	Madame D'Ora	
April		Madame D'Ora	
May	Madame Agnès	Madame D'Ora	
June	—N/a	Drian	
July		Madame D'Ora	
August	Madame Jacques Heim	Madame D'Ora	
September		Egidio Scaioni	
October		Egidio Scaioni	
November	Roberte Cusey		
December		Madame D'Ora	

=== 1933 ===
Issue	Cover model	Photographer/Illustrator	Ref.
January	Madame Agnès	Madame D'Ora	
February	Arletty	Madame D'Ora	
March		Madame D'Ora	
April	Mademoiselle Boecler	Madame D'Ora	
May	—N/a	Léon Benigni	
June	Madame Marie Alphonsine	Madame D'Ora	
July	Lucienne Rivière	Madame D'Ora	
August	—N/a	Léon Benigni	
September	Countess Santa Cruz	Madame D'Ora	
October	Mademoiselle G. de Galbert	Madame D'Ora	
November	—N/a	Léon Benigni	
December	—N/a	Léon Benigni	

=== 1934 ===
Issue	Cover model	Illustrator/Photographer	Ref.
January	—N/a	Moïse Kisling	
February	—N/a	Léon Benigni	
March	—N/a	Léon Benigni	
April	—N/a	Léon Benigni	
May	—N/a	Léon Benigni	
June	—N/a	Léon Benigni	
July	—N/a	Léon Benigni	
August	Madame de Korsak	Madame D'Ora	
September	—N/a	Léon Benigni	
October	—N/a	Léon Benigni	
November	—N/a	S. Chompré	
December	—N/a	S. Chompré	

=== 1935 ===
Issue	Cover model	Illustrator/Photographer	Ref.
January	—N/a		
February	—N/a	S. Chompré	
March	—N/a	Léon Benigni	
April	—N/a	S. Chompré	
May	Madame Agnès	Madame D'Ora	
June	—N/a	Léon Benigni	
July	—N/a	Léon Benigni	
August	—N/a	S. Chompré	
September	—N/a	Léon Benigni	
October	—N/a	Léon Benigni	
November			
December	—N/a	Léon Benigni	

=== 1936 ===
Issue	Cover model	Illustrator/Photographer	Ref.
January	—N/a	Jacques Henri Lartigue	
February	—N/a	Léon Benigni	
March			
April	—N/a	Léon Benigni	
May	Madame Agnès	Madame D'Ora	
June	—N/a	Léon Benigni	
July	—N/a	Léon Benigni	
August	—N/a	Jacques Henri Lartigue	
September	—N/a	Léon Benigni	
October	—N/a	Léon Benigni	
November	—N/a	Léon Benigni	
December	—N/a	Léon Benigni	

=== 1937 ===
Issue	Cover model	Illustrator	Ref.
January	—N/a	Léon Benigni	
February	—N/a	Léon Benigni	
March	—N/a	Léon Benigni	
April	—N/a	Léon Benigni	
May	—N/a	Léon Benigni	
June	—N/a	Léon Benigni	
July	—N/a	Léon Benigni	
August	—N/a	Léon Benigni	
September	—N/a	Léon Benigni	
October	—N/a	Léon Benigni	
November	—N/a	Léon Benigni	
December	—N/a	Léon Benigni	

=== 1938 ===
Issue	Cover model	Illustrator/Photographer	Ref.
January	—N/a	Léon Benigni	
February	—N/a	Léon Benigni	
March	—N/a	Léon Benigni	
April			
May	—N/a	Léon Benigni	
June	—N/a	Léon Benigni	
July	—N/a	Léon Benigni	
August	—N/a	Léon Benigni	
September	—N/a	Léon Benigni	
October	—N/a	Léon Benigni	
November	—N/a	Léon Benigni	
December	—N/a	Léon Benigni	

=== 1939 ===
Issue	Cover model	Illustrator	Ref.
January	—N/a	Léon Benigni	
February	—N/a	Léon Benigni	
March			
April			
May	—N/a	Léon Benigni	
June	—N/a	Léon Benigni	
July	—N/a	Léon Benigni	
August	—N/a	Léon Benigni	
September	—N/a	Léon Benigni	
October/November	—N/a	Léon Benigni	
December/January 1940	—N/a	Léon Benigni	

== 1940s ==
=== 1940 ===
Issue	Cover model	Illustrator	Ref.
February	—N/a	Léon Benigni	
March	—N/a	Léon Benigni	
April	—N/a	Léon Benigni	
May	—N/a	Léon Benigni	
June	—N/a	Léon Benigni	

=== 1941 ===
Issue	Cover model	Illustrator	Ref.
#233			
February	—N/a	Léon Benigni	
March	—N/a	Léon Benigni	
April	—N/a	Léon Benigni	
May	—N/a	Léon Benigni	
June	—N/a	Léon Benigni	
July	—N/a	Léon Benigni	
August/September	—N/a	Léon Benigni	
October	—N/a	Léon Benigni	
November	—N/a	Léon Benigni	
December	—N/a	Léon Benigni	

=== 1942 ===
Issue	Cover model	Illustrator/Photographer	Ref.
January	—N/a	Léon Benigni	
February	—N/a	Léon Benigni	
March	—N/a	Léon Benigni	
April	—N/a	Léon Benigni	
June	—N/a		
July	—N/a	Léon Benigni	
August	—N/a	Léon Benigni	
September	—N/a	Léon Benigni	
October		Philippe Pottier	
November	—N/a	Léon Benigni	
December	—N/a	Léon Benigni	

=== 1943 ===
Issue	Cover model	Illustrator	Ref.
January	—N/a	Léon Benigni	
February	—N/a	Léon Benigni	
March	—N/a	Léon Benigni	
April	—N/a	Léon Benigni	
May	—N/a	Léon Benigni	
#261			
July	—N/a	Léon Benigni	
August	—N/a	Léon Benigni	
September	—N/a	Léon Benigni	
October	—N/a	Léon Benigni	
November	—N/a	Léon Benigni	
December	—N/a	Léon Benigni	

=== 1944 ===
Issue	Cover model	Illustrator/Photographer	Ref.
January			
February	—N/a	Léon Benigni	
March	—N/a	Léon Benigni	
April	—N/a	Léon Benigni	
May	—N/a	Léon Benigni	
June	—N/a	Léon Benigni	
July	—N/a	Pierre Mourgue	
August	—N/a	Léon Benigni	

=== 1945 ===
Issue	Cover model	Illustrator	Ref.
January/February	—N/a	Léon Benigni	
March/April	—N/a	Léon Benigni	
May/June	—N/a	Léon Benigni	
July/August	—N/a	Pierre Mourgue	
October	—N/a	Eduardo García Benito	
December	—N/a	Eduardo García Benito	

=== 1946 ===
Issue	Cover model	Illustrator	Ref.
№287/288	—N/a		
April	—N/a	Eduardo García Benito	
June	—N/a	Eduardo García Benito	
№293/294	—N/a	Pierre Mourgue	
№295/296	—N/a	Pierre Mourgue	
New Year	—N/a	Pierre Mourgue	

=== 1947 ===
Issue	Cover model	Illustrator	Ref.
№299/300	—N/a	Pierre Mourgue	
№301/302	—N/a	René Gruau	
№303/304	—N/a	Pierre Mourgue	
№305/306	—N/a	Pierre Mourgue	
Winter Collections	—N/a	René Gruau	
№309/310	—N/a		

=== 1948 ===
Issue	Cover model	Photographer/Illustrator	Ref.
№311/312	—N/a	René Gruau	
№313/314		Philippe Pottier	
№315/316		Philippe Pottier	
Autumn	Jeanne Klein	Philippe Pottier	
№319/320		Philippe Pottier	
Christmas		Philippe Pottier	

=== 1949 ===
Issue	Cover model	Photographer/Illustrator	Ref.
№323/324		Philippe Pottier	
April	Sylvie Hirsch	Philippe Pottier	
№327/328	—N/a	René Gruau	
№329/330		Philippe Pottier	
№331/332	—N/a	Bernard Blossac	
December	—N/a	René Gruau	

== 1950s ==
=== 1950 ===
Issue	Cover model	Photographer/Illustrator	Ref.
February	—N/a	Pierre Pagès	
April	—N/a	René Gruau	
June	Sylvie Hirsch	Philippe Pottier	
September		Philippe Pottier	
October	Sophie Malgat	Philippe Pottier	
December	Bettina Graziani	Philippe Pottier	

=== 1951 ===
Issue	Cover model	Photographer/Illustrator	Ref.
March	Simone Arnal	Philippe Pottier	
April		Philippe Pottier	
June	Gigi Terwalgne	Philippe Pottier	
September		Philippe Pottier	
October	Anne Campion	Philippe Pottier	
December	—N/a	René Gruau	

=== 1952 ===
Issue	Cover model	Photographer/Illustrator	Ref.
March	Lucky (Lucie Daouphars)	Philippe Pottier	
April	Sophie Malgat	Philippe Pottier	
June	Julia	Philippe Pottier	
September		Philippe Pottier	
№367/368	Joan Whelan	Philippe Pottier	
№369/370	—N/a	René Gruau	

=== 1953 ===
Issue	Cover model	Photographer	Ref.
March		Philippe Pottier	
April	Myrtle Crawford (Lady Acland)	Philippe Pottier	
June	Ghislaine Arsac	Philippe Pottier	
September		Philippe Pottier	
October	Marie-Thérèse Pouch LeMoine	Philippe Pottier	
№381/382	Marie-Thérèse Pouch LeMoine	Philippe Pottier	

=== 1954 ===
Issue	Cover model	Photographer	Ref.
March	Joan Olson	Philippe Pottier	
April	Elinor	Philippe Pottier	
June		Philippe Pottier	
September	Marie-Hélène Arnaud	Philippe Pottier	
October	Ann Farrar	Philippe Pottier	
December	Rose Marie Le Quellec	Philippe Pottier	

=== 1955 ===
Issue	Cover model	Photographer	Ref.
March		Philippe Pottier	
April	Elinor	Philippe Pottier	
June		Philippe Pottier	
September	Marie-Hélène Arnaud	Philippe Pottier	
October	Jacky Mazel	Philippe Pottier	
December	Ghislaine Arsac	Guy Arsac	

=== 1956 ===
Issue	Cover model	Photographer	Ref.
March	Ghislaine Arsac	Philippe Pottier	
№409/410	Jill Howard	Philippe Pottier	
June	Dorothy Griffith	Philippe Pottier	
September		Philippe Pottier	
October		Philippe Pottier	
December	Simone D'Aillencourt	Philippe Pottier	

=== 1957 ===
Issue	Cover model	Photographer	Ref.
March	Simone D'Aillencourt	Philippe Pottier	
№421/422		Philippe Pottier	
№423/424	Simone D'Aillencourt	Philippe Pottier	
September	Simone D'Aillencourt	Philippe Pottier	
October		Philippe Pottier	
December	Dovima	Philippe Pottier	

=== 1958 ===
Issue	Cover model	Photographer/Illustrator	Ref.
March	—N/a	René Gruau	
№433/434	—N/a		
June	Simone D'Aillencourt	Philippe Pottier	
September	Simone D'Aillencourt	Philippe Pottier	
October		Philippe Pottier	
№441/442	Uncredited model, Danielle Loder	Philippe Pottier	

=== 1959 ===
Issue	Cover model	Photographer	Ref.
March	Ghislaine Arsac	Guy Arsac	
April	Nélida Lobato	Philippe Pottier	
June		Philippe Pottier	
September	Jean Newington	Philippe Pottier	
October		Philippe Pottier	
December		Philippe Pottier	

== 1960s ==
=== 1960 ===
Issue	Cover model	Photographer	Ref.
March	—N/a	René Gruau	
April		Philippe Pottier	
№459/460		Philippe Pottier	
September	Ghislaine Arsac	Guy Arsac	
October		Guy Arsac	
December	Wilhelmina Cooper	Roland de Vassal	

=== 1961 ===
Issue	Cover model	Photographer	Ref.
March	Gitta Schilling	Roland de Vassal	
April		Roland de Vassal	
№471/472		Roland de Vassal	
September	Katherine Pastrie	Guy Arsac	
September		Guy Arsac	
October		Roland de Vassal	
December	Katherine Pastrie	Roland de Vassal	

=== 1962 ===
Issue	Cover model	Photographer	Ref.
March		Philippe Pottier	
April		Roland de Vassal	
June		Guy Arsac	
September	Wilhelmina Cooper	Philippe Pottier	
October	Wilhelmina Cooper	Roland de Vassal	
December	Katherine Pastrie	Roland de Vassal	

=== 1963 ===
Issue	Cover model	Photographer	Ref.
March		Philippe Pottier	
April	Tamara Nyman	Denis Reichle	
June		Guy Arsac, Alemian Manoug	
September	Christine Borge	Philippe Pottier	
October		Denis Reichle	
№501/502		Guy Arsac	

=== 1964 ===
Issue	Cover model	Photographer/Illustrator	Ref.
March		Jean-Louis Guégan	
April		Philippe Pottier	
June	Maria Julia	Philippe Pottier	
September	Bettina Lauer	Philippe Pottier	
October		Jean-Louis Guégan	
December	—N/a	René Gruau	

=== 1965 ===
Issue	Cover model	Photographer	Ref.
March		Jean-Louis Guégan	
April		Roland de Vassal	
June	Uncredited model, Simone D'Aillencourt	Walcott	
September	Uncredited model, uncredited model, Simone D'Aillencourt	Jean-Louis Guégan	
October		Frères Séeberger	
№525/526	Christa Fielder	Jean-Louis Guégan	

=== 1966 ===
Issue	Cover model	Photographer	Ref.
March		Jean-Louis Guégan	
April		Jean-Louis Guégan	
June		Roland de Vassal	
September	Christa Fielder, uncredited model	Jean-Louis Guégan	
October		Jean-Louis Guégan	
December		Jean-Louis Guégan	

=== 1967 ===
Issue	Cover model	Photographer	Ref.
March		Jean-Louis Guégan	
April		Jean-Louis Guégan	
June		Jean-Louis Guégan	
September		Jean-Louis Guégan	
October		Roland Bianchini	
№549/550	Kecia Nyman	Roland Bianchini	

=== 1968 ===
Issue	Cover model	Photographer	Ref.
March	Evelyn Kuhn	Jean-Louis Guégan	
April	Alexandra Stewart	Jean-Louis Guégan	
June			
September		Jean-Louis Guégan	
October		Roland Bianchini	
December	Nicole de Lamargé	Roland Bianchini	

=== 1969 ===
Issue	Cover model	Photographer	Ref.
March		Patrick Bertrand	
April		Roland Bianchini	
№567/568		Roland Bianchini	
September	Maria Badeaux, unknown	Jean-Louis Guégan	
October	Jeanette Christiansen	Roland Bianchini	
December		Jean-Louis Guégan	

== 1970s ==
=== 1970 ===
Issue	Cover model	Photographer	Ref.
March	Jeanette Christiansen, unknown	Roland Bianchini	
April		Roland Bianchini	
June	Sandi Collins, uncredited model	Roland Bianchini	
September		Jean-Louis Guégan	
№579			
№580			
December		Roland Bianchini	

=== 1971 ===
Issue	Cover model	Photographer	Ref.
February	Geschi Fengler	Roland Bianchini	
March	Maria-Lisa Leclerc	Roland Bianchini	
April	Maria-Lisa Leclerc	Roland Bianchini	
June		Roland Bianchini	
September	Pat Cleveland	Jean-Louis Guégan	
№587			
№588			
December	Lara Koski	Roland Bianchini	

=== 1972 ===
Issue	Cover model	Photographer	Ref.
March	Marie-Christine Deshayes	Jean-Louis Guégan	
April		Patrick Bertrand	
May	Hella Moeckl	Michael Doster	
№593	Isa Stoppi	Roland Bianchini	
September		Patrick Bertrand	
№595	Hella Moeckl, uncredited male model	Michael Doster	
№596		Jean-Louis Guégan	

=== 1973 ===
Issue	Cover model	Photographer	Ref.
№597	Blanka	Roland Bianchini	
№598			
№599	Samantha	Roland Bianchini	
№600			
№601		Roland Bianchini	
№602			
№603			
December	Ewa Swann	Roland Bianchini	

=== 1974 ===
Issue	Cover model	Photographer	Ref.
February	Jane Birkin	Jean-Louis Guégan	
March		Jean-Louis Guégan	
№607	Marie Laforêt	Rodolphe Haussaire	
№608			
№609		Roland Bianchini	
№610	Patti Hansen		
№611			
№612	Isabel Grandin		

=== 1975 ===
Issue	Cover model	Photographer	Ref.
February	Sophia Loren	Jean-Louis Guégan	
March	Dominique Hamoniere	Roland Bianchini	
№615			
№616	Lil Wergilis (Lil Wenglass Green)	Rodolphe Haussaire	
№617			
September		Patrick Bertrand	
October	Sylvia Kristel	Rodolphe Haussaire	
December	Alexandra King	Patrick Bertrand	

=== 1976 ===
Issue	Cover model	Photographer	Ref.
February		Rodolphe Haussaire	
March		Rodolphe Haussaire	
April	Catherine Deneuve		
№624		Rodolphe Haussaire	
№625			
September	Barbara Jean Hughes	Rodolphe Haussaire	
№627			
December	Marcia Wolf	Roland Bianchini	

=== 1977 ===
Issue	Cover model	Photographer	Ref.
№629			
March	Kimberly James	Rodolphe Haussaire	
April			
May	Allison Maher Stern	Rodolphe Haussaire	
June	Masako Natsume	Michel Picard	
August	Clare Beresford	Rodolphe Haussaire	
September		Roland Bianchini	
October	Marie Laforêt	Rodolphe Haussaire	
November	Sylvie Vartan	Rodolphe Haussaire	
December		Patrick Bertrand	

=== 1978 ===
Issue	Cover model	Photographer	Ref.
№639	Dayle Haddon	Michel Picard	
March	Jerry Hall	Rodolphe Haussaire	
April	Kathy Johanson	Roland Bianchini	
№642	Lisa Love		
№643			
August	Farrah Fawcett	Jean-Daniel Lorieux	
September	Ann Schaufuss	Roland Bianchini	
№646			
№647	Julie Silliman		
№648		Rodolphe Haussaire	

=== 1979 ===
Issue	Cover model	Photographer	Ref.
February	Inès de La Fressange	Michel Picard	
March	Julie Kerr	Roland Bianchini	
April		Rodolphe Haussaire	
May	Jan McGill	Patrick Bertrand	
June		Michel Picard	
August	Andie MacDowell	Michel Picard	
September	Tracy Leigh	Rodolphe Haussaire	
№656	Carol Perkins		
November	Barbara Jean Hughes	Roland Bianchini	
December	Isabelle Adjani	Rodolphe Haussaire	

== 1980s ==
=== 1980 ===
Issue	Cover model	Photographer	Ref.
February	Felicitas Boch	Alain Larue	
March	Glenda Reyna, Nina Klepp, Yvonne Westling		
April	Glenda Reyna		
May	Jane Hitchcock		
June	Yvonne Westling		
August	Juliette Desurmont	Paolo Roversi	
September		Roland Bianchini	
№666	Birgit Conrad		
№667	Mimi Coutelier		
December	Martha Brown	Rodolphe Haussaire	

=== 1981 ===
Issue	Cover model	Photographer	Ref.
February	Anne Bezamat	Jim Greenberg	
March	Jean Marie McClesky	Rodolphe Haussaire	
April		Jean-François du Sel des Monts	
May	Anne Parillaud	Rodolphe Haussaire	
July	Véronique Jannot		
August	Gemma Curry, uncredited model	Antonio Guccione	
September	Jon Foltman	Antonio Guccione	
October	Lisan van der Zalm	Antonio Guccione	
November	Heidi Kay		
December	Brooke Shields	Jean-Daniel Lorieux	

=== 1982 ===
Issue	Cover model	Photographer	Ref.
February	Gina	Jean-Daniel Lorieux	
March	Clio Goldsmith	Ken Browar	
April	Maria Kristiansson		
May	Kelly Lynch	Ken Browar	
June	Princess Caroline of Monaco	François Lamy	
August	Allison Hydorn	Claus Wickrath	
September	Caroline Granger	Rodolphe Haussaire	
№686	Tina Widengren	Antonio Guccione	
№687	Kerry Harper	Ken Browar	
№688	Eva Wallen		

=== 1983 ===
Issue	Cover model	Photographer	Ref.
February	Lisa Rutledge	Ken Browar	
March	Sylvie Carn	Claus Wickrath	
April	Angela Wilde	Barry Dunne	
№692	Lara Harris	Mark Arbett	
June	Lindsey Thurlow	Xavier Alvarez	
August	Patricia Van Ryckeghem	Antonio Guccione	
September	Tina Widengren	Chris Simpson	
October	Carole Bouquet	Dominique Issermann	
November	Isabelle Adjani	Dominique Issermann	
December	Beth Rogers		

=== 1984 ===
Issue	Cover model	Photographer	Ref.
February	Clair Glover		
March	Sophie Duez	Denis Malerbi	
April	Tracy Wilson		
№702	Patricia van Ryckeghem	Denis Malerbi	
№703	Lisa Berkley		
August		Denis Malerbi	
September	Charity Swedberg	Tom Trompeter	
October	Saralyn	Rodolphe Haussaire	
November	Linda Evangelista	Robert Diadul	
December	Bente Ullereng		

=== 1985 ===
Issue	Cover model	Photographer	Ref.
February	Lisa Fallon		
March	Princess Stéphanie of Monaco	Zigmund	
April	Tatjana Patitz	Alain Levine	
May	Jenna de Rosnay		
June/July	Madelaine Robinson		
August	Chloé		
September	Gail Elliott	George Holz	
October	Brooke Shields	François Lamy	
November	Myriem Roussel	Bettina Rheims	
№718	Sylke Larsson		

=== 1986 ===
Issue	Cover model	Photographer	Ref.
№719	Valérie Kaprisky		
March	Carole Bouquet	Steven Silverstein	
April	Andie MacDowell	Nancy LeVine	
May	Elizabeth Grosz		
June	Mak Gilchrist		
August	Micky Monroe	Claus Wickrath	
September	Sam Gold	Benjamin Kanarek	
October	Gail Elliott		
November	Angie Hill	Benjamin Kanarek	
№728	Carrelyn Gardener		

=== 1987 ===
Issue	Cover model	Photographer	Ref.
February	Christa Doelman	François Pomepui	
March	Roberta Chirko	Robert Diadul	
April	Roberta Chirko	Walter Chin	
June	Celia Forner		
August	Ursula Wallis		
September	Annica Ohnesorge	Serge Barbeau	
November	Laurence Vanhaeverbeke	Walter Chin	
December/January 1988	Gail Elliott		

=== 1988 ===
Issue	Cover model	Photographer	Ref.
February	Yasmin Le Bon	Mark Arbeit	
March	Renée Simonsen	Michael Zeppetello	
May	Celia Forner		
June	Laetitia Firmin-Didot		
August	Alexandra Aubin		
September	Therese Bachy	Jonathan Lennard	
November	Robyn Mackintosh	Jonathan Lennard	
№744	Nicola Burns Thompson		

=== 1989 ===
Issue	Cover model	Photographer/Illustrator/Artist	Ref.
February	Elaine Irwin	Hiromasa	
March	—N/a	René Gruau	
April	Julie Anderson	Jonathan Lennard	
June	Meghan Douglas	Hiromasa	
August	Claudia Schiffer	Pietro Privitera	
September	Tanja Bochnig (Tanya Bochnig)	Serge Barbeau	
№751	Michaela Bercu	Hiromasa	
№752	—N/a	César Baldaccini	

== 1990s ==
=== 1990 ===
Issue	Cover model	Photographer	Ref.
February	Valerie Jean Garduno		
March	Nathalie Bachmann	David Woolley	
April	Yasmeen Ghauri	Hiromasa	
June	Rachel Williams	Walter Chin	
August	Aly Dunne	Peter Hönneman	
September	Yasmeen Ghauri	Peter Strube	
№759	Paloma Picasso	David Seidner	
December/January 1991	Gianni Versace, uncredited model	Irving Penn, Francesco Scavullo	

=== 1991 ===
Issue	Cover model	Photographer/Illustrator	Ref.
February	Aly Dunne	Peter Hönneman	
March	Monica Belluci	Peter Hönneman	
April/May	Meghan Douglas	Gianpaolo Vimercati	
June	Stephanie Seymour	Jean-Daniel Lorieux	
August	Emma Sjöberg	Hiromasa	
September	Deanna Lynn Jakubzak	Peter Hönneman	
№767	Nicole Vissers		
December/January 1992	—N/a	René Gruau	

=== 1992 ===
Issue	Cover model	Photographer	Ref.
February	Alexandra Aubin	Hiromasa	
March	Angelika Kallio	Jonathan Lennard	
April/May	Vera Cox		
June	Niki Taylor	Jonathan Lennard	
August	Daniela Peštová	Hiromasa	
September	Angelika Kallio	Jonathan Lennard	
October/November	Lara Harris	Peter Lindbergh	
№776	Annelyse Schoenberger	Jonathan Lennard	

=== 1993 ===
Issue	Cover model	Photographer	Ref.
February	Tyra Banks	Carlo Dalla Chiesa	
March	Shana Zadrick	Hiromasa	
April/May	Debbie Deitering	Hiromasa	
June	Julie Anderson		
August	Amber Valletta	Doug Ordway	
September	Magali Amadei	Francesco Scavullo	
November	Evelina Manna	Francesco Scavullo	
December	Claudia Schiffer	Francesco Scavullo	

=== 1994 ===
Issue	Cover model	Photographer	Ref.
February	Karen Mulder	Francesco Scavullo	
March	Isabella Rossellini	Francesco Scavullo	
May	Yasmeen Ghauri	Francesco Scavullo	
June	Meghan Douglas	Francesco Scavullo	
August	Bridget Hall	Francesco Scavullo	
September	Christy Turlington	Francesco Scavullo	
November	Elle Macpherson	Francesco Scavullo	
December	Yasmeen Ghauri	Francesco Scavullo	

=== 1995 ===
Issue	Cover model	Photographer	Ref.
February	Shalom Harlow	Francesco Scavullo	
March	Phoebe O'Brien	William Laxton	
May	Carla Bruni	Bruno Bisang	
June	Claudia Schiffer	Francesco Scavullo	
August	Meghan Douglas	Francesco Scavullo	
September	Laurie Bird	Grey Zisser	
October	Trish Goff	Francesco Scavullo	
November	Brigitte Bardot (from Vie privée), Karl Lagerfeld, Gianni Versace, Giorgio Armani, Jean Paul Gaultier, Yves Saint Laurent, Valentino, and twenty-one other personalities (collage)	Roger Viollet, Marcio Madeira	
December	Karen Mulder	Francesco Scavullo	

=== 1996 ===
Issue	Cover model	Photographer	Ref.
February	Jodie Kidd	Grey Zisser	
March	Carla Bruni	Bruno Bisang	
April	Karen Mulder	Jean-Daniel Lorieux	
May	Claudia Schiffer	Francesco Scavullo	
June/July	Isabelle Adjani	Frédérique Veysset	
August	Stella Tennant	Francesco Scavullo	
September	Emmanuelle Béart	André Rau	
October	Meghan Douglas	Francesco Scavullo	
November	Jessica Hopper	Hiromasa	
December/January 1997	Chrystèle Saint Louis Augustin	Francesco Scavullo	

=== 1997 ===
Issue	Cover model	Photographer	Ref.
February	Michele Hicks	Michel Nafziger	
March	Astrid Muñoz	Michel Nafziger	
April	Magdalena Wrobel		
May	Claire Danes	Firooz Zahedi	
June	Laura Ponte	Michel Nafziger	
August	Esther de Jong	Michel Nafziger	
September	Mathilde Pedersen	Hiromasa	
October	Sarah Thomas	Neil Kirk	
November	Carmen Kass	Thomas Krappitz	
December	Carole Bouquet	André Rau	

=== 1998 ===
Issue	Cover model	Photographer	Ref.
February	Lonneke Engel	Thomas Krappitz	
March	Michelle Behennah	Thomas Schenk	
April	Erika Stromquist	Bruno Dayan	
May	Tanga Moreau	Sheila Metzner	
June	Fernanda Tavares	Christophe Meimoon	
August	Sharon van der Knaap	Christophe Meimoon	
September	Juliette Binoche	Marc Hom	
October	Tanga Moreau	Oliver Desarte	
November	Jayne Windsor	Geoffroy de Boismenu	
December/January 1999	Jayne Windsor	Riccardo Tinelli	

=== 1999 ===
Issue	Cover model	Photographer	Ref.
February	Rachel Roberts	Jeff Bark	
March	Nicole Anderson	Geoffroy de Boismenu	
April	Sharon van der Knaap	Jeff Bark	
May	Filippa Von Stackelberg		
June	May Andersen	Josh Jordan	
August	Heidi Klum	Marc de Groot	
September	Annie Morton	Randall Bachner	
October	Vivien Solari	Josh Jordan	
November	Haylynn Cohen	Jeff Bark	
December	Lida Egorova	Greg Delves	

== 2000s ==
=== 2000 ===
Issue	Cover model	Photographer	Ref.
February	Audrey Marnay	Bruno Barbazan	
March	Nina Heimlich	Christophe Kutner	
April	Kristina Tsirekidze	Guy Aroch	
May	Kasia Pysiak	Thiemo Sander	
June	Teresa Lourenco	Grey Zisser	
August	Juliana McCarthy	Jeff Bark	
September	Natasha Livak	Tony Kim	
October	Heather Knese	Nicolas Hidiroglou	
November	Agatha Relota	Nicolas Hidiroglou	
December/January 2001	Georgina Grenville	Stephane Dessaint	

=== 2001 ===
Issue	Cover model	Photographer	Ref.
February	Malin Persson	Christophe Kutner	
March	Madeleine Hjort	Christophe Kutner	
April	Catherine Hurley	Christophe Kutner	
May	Liliana Dominguez	Nicolas Hidiroglou	
June/July	Jenny Vatheur	Geoffroy de Boismenu	
August	Liudmila Bakhmat	Marcus Mâm	
September	Charlotte Gainsbourg	Christophe Kutner	
October	Mariacarla Boscono	Nicolas Hidiroglou	
November	Aurélie Claudel	Arno Bani	
December/January 2002	Kristina Chrastekova	Thiemo Sander	

=== 2002 ===
Issue	Cover model	Photographer	Ref.
February	Kristina Chrastekova	Thiemo Sander	
March	Jeisa Chiminazzo	Guy Aroch	
April	Minerva Portillo	Marcus Mâm	
May	Dewi Driegen	Marcus Mâm	
June/July	Bekah Jenkins	Karina Taïra	
August	Tetyana Brazhnyk	Ben Hasset	
September	Aurelie Neukens	Marcus Mâm	
October	Jessica Miller	Alexei Hay	
November	Liberty Ross	Michel Mallard	
December/January 2003	Raquel Zimmermann	Cédric Buchet	

=== 2003 ===
Issue	Cover model	Photographer	Ref.
February	Raquel Zimmermann	Sølve Sundsbø	
March	Letícia Birkheuer	Jeff Riedel	
April	Christy Turlington	Matthias Vriens	
May	Liliane Ferrarezi	Cédric Buchet	
June/July	Lou Doillon	Javier Vallhonrat	
August	Liliana Dominguez	Antonio Spinoza	
September	Mor Katzir	Michel Mallard	
October	Eva Jay Kubatova	Michel Mallard	
November	Kemp Muhl	Michel Mallard	
December/January 2004	Emmanuelle Béart	Anuschka Blommers, Niels Schumm	

=== 2004 ===
Issue	Cover model	Photographer	Ref.
February	Stella Tennant	Jonathan de Villiers	
March	Carmen Maria Hillestad	David Bailey	
April	Suzanne Pots	Luis Sanchis	
May	Vanessa Paradis	John Nollet	
June/July	Uma Thurman	David Ferrua	
August	Danna Lee Ballard	Mark Squires	
September	Bianca Balti	Alexi Lubomirski	
October	Elizabeth Jagger	Mark Squires	
November	Rosie Huntington-Whiteley, Britt Thorsey	Mark Squires	
December/January 2005	Bianca Balti	Alexi Lubomirski	

=== 2005 ===
Issue	Cover model	Photographer	Ref.
February	Vivien Solari	Diego Uchitel	
March	Scarlett Johansson	David Ferrua	
April	Sasha Pivovarova	Elina Kechicheva	
May	Sophie Marceau	Robert Wyatt	
June/July	Riley Keough	Mark Squires	
August	Leah De Wavrin	Takay	
September	Claudia Schiffer	Katja Rahwles	
October	Chloë Sevigny		
November	Diane Kruger		
December/January 2006	Tom Ford, Anna Jagodzińska		

=== 2006 ===
Issue	Cover model	Photographer	Ref.
February	Elena Melnik	David Vasiljevic	
March	Yana Karpova	Stratis & Beva	
April	Sasha Beznosyuk	David Vasiljevic	
May	Anna Mouglalis	David Vasiljevic	
June/July	Chiara Baschetti	Takay	
August	Marina de Paula	Stratis & Beva	
September	Audrey Marnay	David Vasiljevic	
October	Lonneke Engel	Andreas	
November	Aleksandra Ørbeck Nilssen	Stratis & Beva	
December/January 2007	Lindsay Lohan	François Rotger	

=== 2007 ===
Issue	Cover model	Photographer	Ref.
February	Nadine Wolfbeiszer	Andreas	
March	Carla Hermannsen	Andreas	
April	Robin Wright Penn	Daniel Gabbay	
May	Josefin Hedström		
June/July	Masha Novoselova	Elina Kechicheva	
August	Cat Power	Elina Kechicheva	
September	Michaela Kocianova	Catherine Servel	
October	Egle Tvirbutaite		
November	Elyse Saunders	Guy Aroch	
December/January 2008	Nadine Wolfbeiszer	Elina Kechicheva	

=== 2008 ===
Issue	Cover model	Photographer	Ref.
February	Diane Kruger	Guy Aroch	
March	Sona Matufkova	Jon Compson	
April	Cato van Ee	Jon Compson	
May	Christina Ricci	Guy Aroch	
June/July	Sofia Bartos	Elina Kechicheva	
August	Elisa Sednaoui	Jon Compson	
September	Zuzana Gregorová	Harri Peccinotti	
October	Sigita Nedzvecka	Harri Peccinotti	
November	Emma MacLaren	Harri Peccinotti	
December/January 2009	Alyssa Miller	Jonathan de Villiers	

=== 2009 ===
Issue	Cover model	Photographer	Ref.
February	Julia Dunstall	Andrea Spotorno	
March	Anouck Lepère	Harri Peccinotti	
April	Tiiu Kuik	Enrique Badulescu	
May	Clive Owen, Amparo Bonmati	Harri Peccinotti	
June/July	Mischa Barton	Andrea Spotorno	
August	Marion Cotillard	Andrea Spotorno	
September	Jana Knauerova	Enrique Badulescu	
October	Hana Soukupová	Doug Inglish	
November	Chloë Sevigny	Todd Cole	
December/January 2010	Vahina Giocante	Andrea Spotorno	

== 2010s ==
=== 2010 ===
Issue	Cover model	Photographer	Ref.
February	Barbara Palvin	Martin Lidell	
March	Marion Cotillard	Koto Bolofo	
April	Cindy Crawford	Paul Wetherell	
May	Léa Seydoux	Paul Wetherell	
June	Ali Stephens	Martin Lidell	
August	Alexa Chung	Guy Aroch	
September	Mélanie Thierry	Philippe Cometti	
October	Dakota Johnson	Sasha Eisenman	
November	Kasia Szwan	René Habermacher	
December/January 2011	Bianca Brandolini	Martin Lidell	

=== 2011 ===
Issue	Cover model	Photographer	Ref.
February	Imogen Newton	Mason Poole	
March	Beyoncé	Mark Pillai	
April	Anna Mouglalis	Thomas Nutzl	
May	Angela Lindvall	Thomas Nutzl	
June/July	Natalia Vodianova	Enrique Badulescu	
August	Jessica Miller	Satoshi Saïkusa	
September	Bianca Balti	Marcin Tyszka	
October	Tavi Gevinson	Jean-Paul Goude	
November	Christy Turlington	Guy Aroch	
December/January 2012	Eva Green	Satoshi Saïkusa	

=== 2012 ===
Issue	Cover model	Photographer	Ref.
February	Chanel Iman	Michael Roberts	
March	Siri Tollerød	Marcin Tyszka	
April	Ashley Smith	Satoshi Saïkusa	
May	Joanna Koltuniak	Thomas Nutzl	
June/July	Gabriella Wilde	Leo Kackett	
August	Ieva Lagūna	Alexander Neumann	
September	Katy Perry	Cuneyt Akeroglu	
October	Izabel Goulart	Michael Roberts	
November	Kasia Smutniak	Lorenzo Bringheli	
December/January 2013	Carole Bouquet, Darya Rassam	Trent McGinn	

=== 2013 ===
Issue	Cover model	Photographer	Ref.
February	Laís Ribeiro	Michael Roberts	
March	Natalia Vodianova	Benoît Peverelli	
April	Lana Del Rey	Nicole Nodland	
May	Barbara Palvin	Cuneyt Akeroglu	
June/July	Georgia May Jagger	Lorenzo Bringheli	
August	Ruby Aldridge	Taki Bibelas	
September	Chiara Mastroianni	Satoshi Saïkusa	
October	Marisa Berenson, Julie Depardieu, Farida Khelfa, Hélène Fillières, Philippe Katerine, Arielle Dombasle, Niels Schneider, Grégoire Colin, Ariel Wizman, Audrey Marnay, Élodie Navarre, Valérie Donzelli, Samuel Mercer, Élie Top, Anna Sigalevitch, Jérémie Elkaïm, Patrick Mille, Catherine Baba	Karl Lagerfeld	
November	Rebecca Hall	Patrik Sehlstedt	
December/January 2014	Camille Rowe	Baard Lunde	

=== 2014 ===
Issue	Cover model	Photographer	Ref.
February	Amy Adams	Mathieu César	
March	Jessica Hart	Matthias Vriens	
April	Sky Ferreira	Alexei Hay	
May	Louis Garrel, Emmanuelle Seigner	Michelangelo di Battista	
June/July	Angela Lindvall	Alexei Hay	
August	Frankie Rayder	Alexei Hay	
September	Aymeline Valade	Megaforce	
October	Suki Waterhouse	Laurence Ellis	
November	Karolína Kurková	Marcin Tyszka	
December/January 2015	Elisa Sednaoui	Laurence Ellis	

=== 2015 ===
Issue	Cover model	Photographer	Ref.
February	Rita Ora	Jesse John Jenkins	
March	Salma Hayek	Daniel Thomas Smith	
April	Georgia May Jagger	Marcin Tyszka	
May	Camille Rowe	Alexei Hay	
June/July	Barbara Palvin	Nadine Ottawa	
August	Lily Aldridge	Hugh Lippe	
September	Elizabeth Olsen	Todd Cole	
October	Marthe Wiggers	Osma Harvilahti	
November	Natalia Vodianova	Simon Emmett	
November	Carla Bruni	Simon Emmett	
November	Liya Kebede	Simon Emmett	
November	Salma Hayek	Simon Emmett	
November	Sharon Stone	Simon Emmett	
December/January 2016	Cressida Bonas	Brendan Freeman	

=== 2016 ===
Issue	Cover model	Photographer	Ref.
February	Moa Aberg	Piczo	
March	Thylane Blondeau	Satoshi Saïkusa	
March	Angelina Woreth	Laura Coulson	
March	Lottie Moss	Bryan Adams	
March	Anaïs Gallagher	Hill & Aubrey	
April	Amanda Wellsh	Mathieu Cesar	
May	Emly Liebendorfer	Daniel Thomas Smith	
June/July	Diplo, Marloes Horst, uncredited performer	Alexei Hay	
August	Hilary Rhoda	Sebastian Sabal-Bruce	
August	Marie-Ange Casta	Mathieu César	
August	Hayell McCarthy	Bella Howard	
August	Giulia Venturini	Pierpaolo Ferrari	
September	Iman, Ciara, Ajak Deng, Maria Borges, Anais Mali, Grace Bol, Riley Montana, Adesuwa Aighewi	Ellen von Unwerth	
October	Lou Doillon	Edouard Plongeon	
October	Iris Apfel	Raffaele Cariou	
October	Damarias Goddrie	Jeremy Liebman	
November	Jessica Chastain	Dusan Reljin	

=== 2017 ===
Issue	Cover model	Photographer	Ref.
February	Ava Hawk McDean, Anine Van Velzen	Priscillia Saada	
March	Clara 3000	Laetita Hotte	
April	Rosamund Pike	Masha Mel	
May	Emily Ratajkowski	Sam Nixon	
June/July	Sonia Ben Ammar	Katie McCurdy	
August	Aymeline Valade	Daniyel Lowden	
September	Thylane Blondeau	Daniyel Lowden	
October	Grace Hartzel	Daniyel Lowden	
November	Millie Bobby Brown	Katie McCurdy	
December/January 2018	Elle Fanning	Mathieu Cesar	

=== 2018 ===
Issue	Cover model	Photographer	Ref.
February	Audrey Marnay	Daniyel Lowden	
March	Lana Del Rey	Mick Rock	
March	Adèle Farine	Myro Wulff	
April	Chloë Grace Moretz	Myro Wulff	
May	Sara Sampaio	Emma Hartvig	
June/July	Katherine Langford	Daria Kobayashi Ritch	
June/July	Angela Lindvall	Daria Kobayashi Ritch	
June/July	Soko	Daria Kobayashi Ritch	
August	Adèle Haenel	Alice Moitié	
August	Chloë Sevigny	Alice Moitié	
August	Daphne Groeneveld	Alice Moitié	
August	Eva Herzigová	Alice Moitié	
August	Joséphine de La Baume, Romain Gavras	Alice Moitié	
August	Stacy Martin	Alice Moitié	
September	Gia Coppola	Daria Kobayashi Ritch	
September	Jeanne Damas	Daria Kobayashi Ritch	
September	Rowan Blanchard	Daria Kobayashi Ritch	
September	Ni Ni	Chen Man	
October	Ashley Graham	Danny Lowe	
October	Angelina Vangor	Michel Valaire	
November	Laura Harrier	Daniyel Lowden	
December/January 2019	Hailey Baldwin-Bieber	Danny Lowe	
December/January 2019	Nadja Auermann, Cosima Auermann, Nicolas Auermann	Danny Lowe	
December/January 2019	Joey King	Danny Lowe	

=== 2019 ===
Issue	Cover model	Photographer	Ref.
February	Zoë Kravitz	Zoey Grossmann	
March	Julianne Moore	Zoey Grossmann	
April	Kiernan Shipka	Danny Lowe	
April	Esther McGregor	Walter Pierre	
May	Stacy Martin	Guen Fiore	
May	Maeva Marshall	Guen Fiore	
June/July	Chloe Wise	Katie McCurdy	
June/July	Sadie Sink	Katie McCurdy	
August	Jennifer Connelly	Marli Andre	
August	Kiko Mizuhara	Jens Langkjaer	
August	Hailey Gates	Daniyel Lowden	
September	Doona Bae	Danny Lowe	
September	Adèle Exarchopoulos	Danny Lowe	
October	Solange Knowles	Rafael Rios	
October	Cai Xukun	Jumbo Tsui	
October	Coucou Chloe	Florence Mann	
October	Jack Irving, Ben Irving, Lily Gavin	Alice Moitié	
November	Angèle	Alice Moitié	
November	Sylvia Hocks	Evan Browning	
November	Samara Weaving	Evan Browning	
November	Kristine Froseth	Lauren Dukoff	
November	Zoey Deutch	Roberto Patella	
December/January 2020	Ebonee Davis	Micaiah Carter	
December/January 2020	Salem Mitchell	Micaiah Carter	
December/January 2020	Hailee Steinfeld	Arkan Zakharkov	
December/January 2020	Tali Lennox	Emman Motanlvan	
December/January 2020	Yang Mi	Qi Li	
December/January 2020	Harry Styles	Daniyel Lowden	
December/January 2020	Viola Arrivabene, Vera Arrivabene	Dennis Schonberg	

== 2020s ==
=== 2020 ===
Issue	Cover model	Photographer	Ref.
February	Camille Rowe	Danyiel Lowden	
February	Lou Lampros	Marli Andre	
February	Soko, Indigo Blue	Marli Andre	
February	Camille Jansen	Guen Fiore	
March	Emma Mackey	Guen Fiore	
March	Alexa Chung	Guen Fiore	
March	Nour Arida	Guen Fiore	
March	Jorja Smith	Elliot Kennedy	
April	Devon Lee Carlson	Fiona Toree	
April	Puma Rose Buck	Lauren Maccabee	
July/August	Shira Haas	Dudi Hasson	
July/August	Keyah Blu	Maxwell Granger	
July/August	Karolína Kurková	Paul Empson	
Autumn	Alton Mason, Shayna McNeil	Cass Bird	
Autumn	Camille Rowe	Georgia Hardt	
Autumn	Rebecca Marder	Maxwell Granger	
Autumn	Stacy Martin	Maxwell Granger	
Autumn	Lyna Khoudri	Marli Andre	
Autumn	Tina Kunakey	Sonia Sieff	
Winter 2020/2021	Jeanne Damas	Denis Boulze	
Winter 2020/2021	Gracie Abrams	Lauren Leekley	
Winter 2020/2021	A. G. Cook	Lindsay Ellary	
Winter 2020/2021	Lily Collins	Sam Taylor-Johnson	

=== 2021 ===
Issue	Cover model	Photographer	Ref.
February	Sienna Miller	Tom Munro	
February	Camille Razat	Stella Berkofsky	
February	Suzanne Lindon	Stella Berkofsky	
April/May	Camille Charrière	Fiona Torre	
April/May	Allen Deng	Zack Zheng	
April/May	Andra Day	Alexi Lubomirski	
June/July	Katy Perry	Greg Swales	
June/July	Laura Harrier	Danielle Levitt	
June/July	Tina Kunakey	Melie Hirtz	
September	Jessica Chastain	Alexi Lubomirski	
December	Elle Fanning	Danielle Levitt	
December	Daniel Buren, Ora-Ito	Mathieau Cesar	
December	Thylane Blondeau	Stéphanie Davilma	

=== 2022 ===
Issue	Cover model	Photographer/Artist	Ref.
February	Adriana Lima	Marcus Cooper	
February	Léna Situations	Leon Prost	
February	Maude Apatow	Carlotta Kohl	
June	Ivy Getty	Kenzia Bengel De Vaulx	
June	Kerry Washington	Texas Isaiah	
June	Aminta Nofore	Matt Colombo	
September	Ana De Armas	Thomas Whiteside	
September	Isabelle Adjani	Sandra Fourqui	
September	Maggie Q	David Urbanke	
November	Rita Ora	Lee Malone	
November	—N/a	Emma Stern	
December	Sadie Sink	Léa Winkler	
December	Josephine de La Baume, Carlos O'Connell	Alice Hawkins	
December	Alexander Zverev	Pierre-Ange Carlotti	
December	Isabeli Fontana	Vincent Peters	

=== 2023 ===
Issue	Cover model	Photographer	Ref.
February	Simona Tabasco	Davide Musto	
February	Cynthia Erivo	Axle Jozeph	
February	Mae Mei Lapres	Filippo Tarentini	
May	Nana Komatsu	Emma Panchot	
May	Ludivine Sagnier	Louise Meylan	
May	Baptiste Giabiconi	Emma Panchot	
May	Sabrina Impacciatore	Erica Fava	
May	Doja Cat	Greg Lotus	
June/July	Eiza González	Nick Thompson	
June/July	Gal Gadot	Céleste Sloman	
September	Emma Corrin	Tung Walsh	
September	Jay Chou	Paul Zhang	
November	Fan Bingbing	Chen Man	
November	Gracie Abrams	Aidan Cullen	
December	Vanessa Kirby	Céleste Sloman	
December	Charles Leclerc	Emma Panchot	
December	Adrian Cheng	Alan Gelati	

=== 2024 ===
Issue	Cover model	Photographer	Ref.
February/March	Dakota Johnson	Quil Lemons	
February/March	Souheila Yacoub	Emma Panchot	
May	Natalie Portman	Ellen von Unwerth	
May	Jackson Wang	Liu Song	
June/July	Megan Thee Stallion	Quil Lemons	
September	Nicole Kidman	Matthew Brookes	
September	Sasha Pivovarova	Heather Hazzan	
November	Salma Hayek Pinault	Charlie Gray	
November	Nyanderi Deng	Ursu	
December/January 2025	Lyna Khoudri	Éric Guillemain	
December/January 2025	Julianne Moore	David Roemer	

=== 2025 ===
Issue	Cover model	Photographer	Ref.
February	Amanda Seyfried	Cameron McCool	
February	Yoonmi Sun	Bohdán Bohdánov	
February	Lilli Zoe, Seng Khan, Nyouma Tacheboubet	Alexandre Roy-Gilbert (Royal Gilbert)	
April/May	Ciara	Emman Montalvan	
June	Orlando Bloom	The Morelli Brothers	
June	Tiffany Tang	Zeng Wu	
July/August	Jackson Wang	Rob Rusling	
September	Jessica Chastain	JuanKr	
September	Vialina Lemann	Luca Stefanon	
November	Florence Welch	Autumn de Wilde	
November	Kelly Rowland	Ricardo Abrahao	
November	Akur Goi	Bohdán Bohdánov	
December	Michelle Yeoh	Domen & Van De Velde	

=== 2026 ===
Issue	Cover model	Photographer	Ref.
February/March	Penélope Cruz	Greg Swales	
April/May	Kate Hudson	Chantal Anderson	
June/July	Anya Taylor-Joy	Szilveszter Makó	
September	Angelina Jolie	Norman Jean Roy	
November	Isabeau De la Tour	Emma Panchot	

== Rankings ==
=== Cover Models ===
as of the June/July 2026 issue
Rank	Cover Model	Number of Covers
1	Simone d'Aillencourt	8
1	Madame Agnès	8
2	Ghislaine Arsac	5
2	Meghan Douglas	5
2	Claudia Schiffer	5
3	Isabelle Adjani	4
3	Yasmeen Ghauri	4
3	Audrey Marnay	4
3	Camille Rowe	4
4	Bianca Balti	3
4	Thylane Blondeau	3
4	Carole Bouquet	3
4	Carla Bruni	3
4	Jessica Chastain	3
4	Wilhelmina Cooper	3
4	Gail Elliott	3
4	Salma Hayek	3
4	Angela Lindvall	3
4	Stacy Martin	3
4	Karen Mulder	3
4	Barbara Palvin	3
4	Katherine Pastrie	3
4	Chloë Sevigny	3
4	Christy Turlington	3
4	Natalia Vodianova	3

=== Photographers/Illustrators ===
as of the June/July 2026 issue
Rank	Photographer/illustrator	Number of Covers
1	Léon Benigni	102
2	Madame d'Ora	88
3	Philippe Pottier	70
4	Roland Bianchini	29
5	Jean-Louis Guégan	26

== See also ==
- Pat Cleveland, first black model with a solo cover of L'Officiel, September 1971
- List of L'Officiel Hommes cover models
