= List of L'Officiel Japan cover models =

Cover of the first issue (April/May 2005)

This list of L'Officiel Japan cover models (2005–2008; 2015–2017; 2024–present) is a catalog of cover models who have appeared on the cover of L'Officiel Japan, the Japanese edition of French fashion magazine L'Officiel. From 2005 to 2008 the magazine was published as L'Officiel Japon.

== 2000s ==
=== 2005 ===
Issue	Cover model	Photographer	Ref.
April/May			
No.2			
No.3			
October/November	Leah de Wavrin	Takay	
No.5			

=== 2006 ===
Issue	Cover model	Photographer	Ref.
No.6			
No.7			
No.8			
No.9	Eikichi Yazawa, Unknown		
October		Andreas	
November	Audrey Marnay	David Vasiljevic	
December	Lonneke Engel	Andreas	

=== 2007 ===
Issue	Cover model	Photographer	Ref.
January	Aleksandra Ørbeck Nilssen	Stratis & Beva	
February/March	Lindsay Lohan	François Rotger	
April	Nadine Wolfbeiszer	Andreas	
May	Carla Hermannsen	Andreas	
June		Stratis & Beva	
August			
October	Cat Power	Elina Kechicheva	
December	Carolina Pantoliano	Catherine Serve	

=== 2008 ===
Issue	Cover model	Photographer	Ref.
February	Ekat Kiseleva	Nicholai Fischer	
April	Diane Kruger	Guy Aroch	

== 2010s ==
=== 2015 ===
Issue	Cover model	Photographer	Ref.
Sample Issue	Saila Kunikida		
November	Vanessa Paradis		
December			

=== 2016 ===
Issue	Cover model	Photographer	Ref.
January/February	Lou Doillon	Mote Sinabel Aoki	
March	Natalia Vodianova	Simon Emmett	
April	Jeanne Damas	Hiromasa	
May	Izumi Mori, Hikari Mori		
June	Nina Anine van Velzen		
July/August	Olivia Palermo	Conan Thai	
September	Lorelle Rayner	Hiro	
October	Hilary Rhoda	Sebastian Sabal-Bruce	
November	Jessica Chastain	Dusan Reljin	
December	Olga Sherer		

=== 2017 ===
Issue	Cover model	Photographer	Ref.
January/February	Anna Cleveland	Hiromasa	

== 2020s ==
=== 2024 ===
Issue	Cover model	Photographer	Ref.
September	Rie Miyazawa	Kazumi Kurigami	
September (Digital)	Nicole Kidman	Matthew Brookes	
November	Takuya Kimura	Kazumi Kurigami	

=== 2025 ===
Issue	Cover model	Photographer	Ref.
March	Hikari Mori	Kinya Ota	
June	Mina	Kinya Ota	
September	Tomohisa Yamashita	Maciej Kucia	
November	Sana	Kinya Ota	

=== 2026 ===
Issue	Cover model	Photographer	Ref.
March	Yuumi Kawai	Kazumi Kurigami	
June	Kento Nakajima	Maciej Kucia	
September	Ai Tominaga	Yusuke Miyazaki	
November	Shunsuke Michieda		

== See also ==
- List of Vogue Japan cover models
- List of Harper's Bazaar Japan cover models
