= Arend Basile =

Dutch fashion designer (1957–2022)

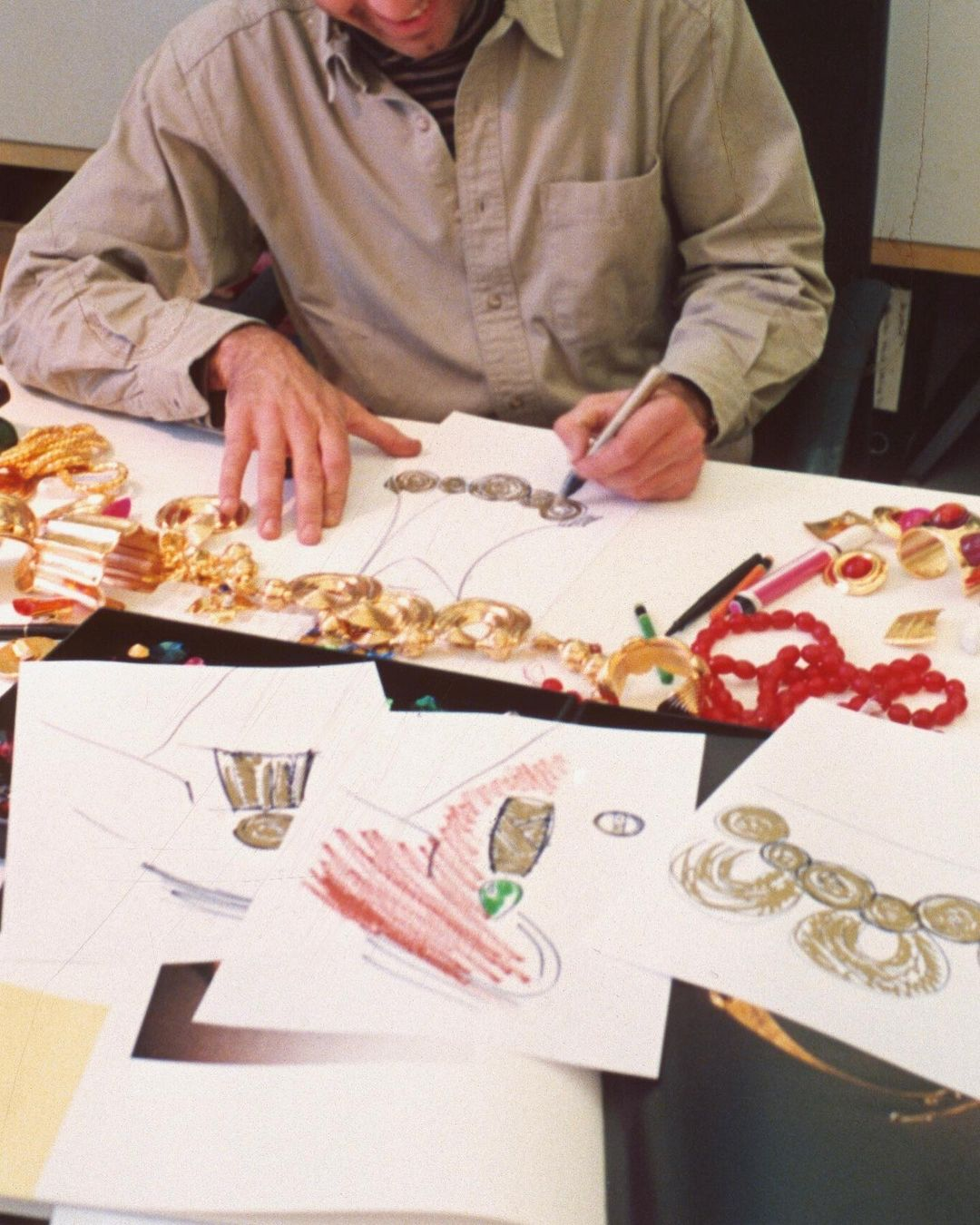
- Arend Basile sketching accessories for Givenchy Haute Couture in the 1990s
- Born: March 29, 1957; Rome, Italy
- Died: April 25, 2022 (aged 65); Houston, Texas
- Education: L'École de la Chambre Syndicale de la Couture Parisienne
- Employer(s): Alexander McQueen, Givenchy, John Galliano, Jean-Louis Scherrer

Arend Basile was a Dutch-Italian fashion designer and former design assistant to Hubert de Givenchy.

== Early life and education ==
The son of an American diplomat, half Dutch and Italian-American designer Arend Basile has lived in London, Finland, Sweden, Holland, Washington D.C. and North Africa. After graduating from L'École de la Chambre Syndicale de la Couture Parisienne first in his class with honors, Arend Basile began his career as a design assistant to Jean-Louis Scherrer in Paris for pret-a-porter and haute couture.

== Career ==
He joined the House of Givenchy in 1983 as a design assistant and was named studio director and premier assistant to Hubert de Givenchy for pret-a-porter and haute couture in 1989, a post he held until his departure from the House in 1997, also working with John Galliano and Alexander McQueen. While at Givenchy, Arend's additional responsibilities included the design and production of Givenchy accessories (jewelry, shoes, handbags, gloves, sunglasses, furs and swimwear). Nineties supermodel Yasmeen Ghauri can be seen wearing a Givenchy F/W 1995 statement necklace designed by Arden Basile on the cover of ¡Hola! Magazine.

== Death ==
Arend Basile died at the age of 65 in Houston, Texas.
