= Lonneke =

Dutch feminine given name

Lonneke is a feminine Dutch given name. Notable people with the name include:

- Lonneke Engel (born 1981), Dutch fashion model and entrepreneur
- Lonneke Slöetjes (born 1990), Dutch volleyball player
- Lonneke Uneken (born 2000), Dutch professional racing cyclist
