= Nicola Perscheid =

German photographer (1864–1930)

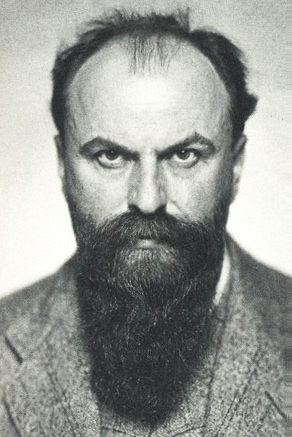
- Self-portrait of Nicola Perscheid (1910)
- Born: Nikolaus Perscheid; 3 December 1864; Moselweiß, Kingdom of Prussia
- Died: 12 May 1930 (aged 65); Berlin, Germany
- Occupation: Photographer

Nicola Perscheid (3 December 1864 – 12 May 1930) was a German photographer. He is primarily known for his artistic portrait photography. He developed the "Perscheid lens", a soft focus lens for large format portrait photography.

== Life and career ==
Perscheid was born as Nikolaus Perscheid in Moselweiß near Koblenz, Kingdom of Prussia, where he also went to school. At the age of 15, he began an apprenticeship as a photographer. Subsequently, Perscheid earned his living as an itinerant photographer; he worked, amongst other places, in Saarbrücken, Trier, and Colmar, but also in Nice, Vienna, or Budapest. In Klagenfurt in Austria he finally found a permanent position and on 1 March 1887, he became a member of the Photographic Society of Vienna (Wiener Photographische Gesellschaft). In 1889, he moved to Dresden, where he initially worked in the studio of Wilhelm Höffert (1832–1901), a well-known studio in Germany at that time, before opening his own studio in Görlitz on 6 June 1891. The next year he was appointed court photographer at the court of Albert, King of Saxony. In 1894, Perscheid moved to Leipzig.

Perscheid had his first publication of an image of his in a renowned photography magazine in 1897, and subsequently participated in many exhibitions and also had contacts with artist Max Klinger. As an established and well-known photographer, he moved in 1905 to Berlin. There, he experimented with early techniques for colour photography, without much success, and when his assistant Arthur Benda left him in 1907, Perscheid gave up these experiments altogether. His portraits, however, won him several important prizes, but apparently were not an economic success: he sold his studio on 24 June 1912.

In October 1913, he held a course at the Swedish society of professional photographers, the Svenska Fotografernas Förbund, which must have been a success as it was praised even ten years later. In 1923, he followed a call by the Danish college for photography in Copenhagen.

Percheid had several students who would later become renowned photographers themselves. Arthur Benda studied with him from 1899 to 1902, and joined him again in 1906 as his assistant for experimenting with colour photography. Benda left Perscheid in 1907; together with Dora Kallmus he went to Vienna and worked in her studio Atelier d'Ora, which he eventually took over and that continued to exist under the name d'Ora-Benda until 1965. Kallmus herself also had studied from January to May 1907 at Perscheid's. Henry B. Goodwin, who later emigrated to Sweden and in 1913 organized Perscheid's course there, studied with Perscheid in 1903. In 1924 the Swedish photographer Curt Götlin (1900–1993) studied at Perscheid's studio. Perscheid also influenced the Japanese photographer Toragorō Ariga, who studied in Berlin from 1908 to 1914 and also followed Perscheid's courses. He returned in 1915 to Japan.

The Perscheid lens was developed around 1920. It is a soft-focus lens with a wide depth of field, produced by Emil Busch AG after the specifications of Perscheid. The lens is designed especially for large format portrait photography. Ariga introduced the Perscheid lens in Japan, where it became very popular amongst Japanese portrait photographers of the 1920s.

Even after the sale of his studio, Perscheid continued to work as a photographer and even rented other studio rooms in 1917. Besides artistic photography, he also always did "profane" studio portraits, for instance for the Postkartenvertrieb Willi Sanke in Berlin that between 1910 and 1918 published a series of about 600 to 700 numbered aviation postcards, including a large number of portraits of flying aces, including Manfred von Richthofen a number of which were done by Perscheid. Towards the end of the 1920s, Perscheid had severe financial problems. In autumn 1929 he had to sub-rent his apartment to be able to pay his own rent. Shortly afterwards, he suffered a stroke, and was hospitalized in spring of 1930. While he was at the hospital, his belongings, including his cameras and photographic plates, but also all his furniture were auctioned off to pay his debts. Two weeks after the auction, on 12 May 1930, Perscheid died at the Charité hospital in Berlin.
