= Aroch =

Aroch is a surname. Notable people with the surname include:

- Arie Aroch (1908–1974), Israeli painter and diplomat
- Guy Aroch, Israeli-American photographer
