= Léon Benigni =

Italian fashion illustrator, graphic designer and lithographer (1892–1948)

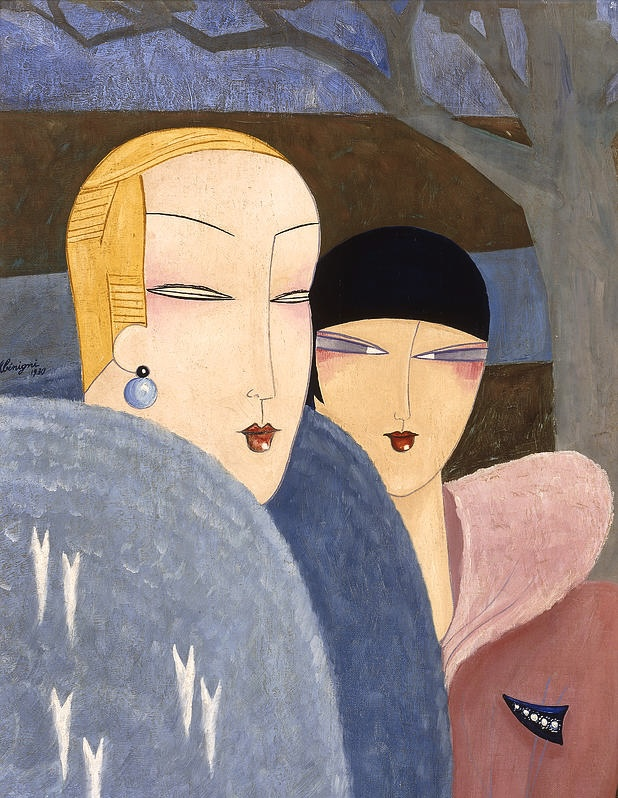
Winter 1930, by Benigni, oil on canvas, private collection

Léon Benigni (20 April 1892 – January 1948) was an Italian fashion illustrator, graphic designer and lithographer.

Benigni worked with fashion designers including Jeanne Lanvin, Marcel Rochas, Elsa Schiaparelli, Lucien Lelong, Jacques Fath, Jean Patou, Nina Ricci, and Cristobal Balenciaga. He also worked for many magazines including Harper's Bazaar, Modes & Travaux, Femina, and notably from the early 1930s to the mid-1940s L'Officiel, he worked closely with the publication illustrating over 90 covers for the magazine.
