= Leyla Blue =

American singer-songwriter (born 2000)

- Born: Leyla Blue Aroch; September 13, 2000 (age 25); New York City, United States
- Genres: Pop; R&B
- Occupations: Singer; songwriter
- Years active: 2019–present
- Label: Island (2019–2021)
- Website: leylablue.online

Leyla Blue Aroch (born September 13, 2000), professionally known as Leyla Blue, is an American singer-songwriter from New York City. She became known through her debut Ep "Songs For Boys That Didn't text Me Back" released in 2019.

== Early life ==
Leyla Blue Aroch was born and raised in Tribeca, New York City, to Israeli father Guy Aroch and Icelandic mother Anna Palma, both renowned fashion photographers. She is the eldest of three daughters, with younger sisters named Sunny and Coco. Raised in an artistic household, Blue developed an early fascination with music and began writing songs and singing in her bedroom as a teenager. Before transferring to the Professional Children's School, she attended Beacon School, where she switched from to focus on her growing interest in music. Blue later joined the New York University Clive Davis Institute of Recorded Music, where she developed further more her songwriting and vocal abilities.

Throughout her adolescence, Blue has spoken openly about experiencing mental health challenges including obsessive–compulsive disorder, depression and an eating disorder. She says music is a therapeutic way for her to find purpose, and explains it helped her feel less alone and gave her motivation to pursue a music career.

== Career ==
Blue signed with Island Records in 2019, releasing her debut Ep 'Songs For Boys That Didn't Text Me Back". The Ep includes her viral single "What A Shame" which gained international recognition after going viral on TikTok, a moment highlighted by Paper magazine. "What A Shame" became a success in Brazil. The song was officially certified triple platinum and diamond by Pro-Musica Brasil, the country's musical industry association. these certifications recognizes sales and streams across all platforms, including physical purchases, digital downloads, and streaming equivalent to hundreds of thousands of units consumed. The track was released under Island Records, a division of Universal Music Group.

In October 2020, Blue released "Fuck Yourself", a feminist song inspired by the MeToo movement. receiving recognition from Wonderland Magazine. She performed "Fuck Yourself" for the first time at the Slipper Room in New York city, delivering a message about female autonomy to the audience. Later in the same year of 2020, she released "Company", alongside a self edited music video recorded during the quarantine.

In Early 2022, Blue released her first single "Hot One" Independently, featuring Baby Tate and Rei Ami. The track was her first release after parting ways from Island Records.

== Discography ==
=== EPs ===
Title	Year
Songs for Boys That Didn't Text Me Back	2019
Drive Me Mad	2025

=== Singles ===
Title	Year	Certification
"Silence"	2019	
"What a Shame"	2019	PMB: Diamond
"Peppa Pig"	2020	
"Fuck Yourself"	2020	
"Company"	2021	
"Hot One"	2021	
"Jane Doe"	2022	
"It Still Rains in Paradise"	2023	
"LateNight"	2023	
"BuzzKill"	2023	
"Road Rage"	2024	
"Red Bull"	2024	
