= Sanke card =

Series of postcards

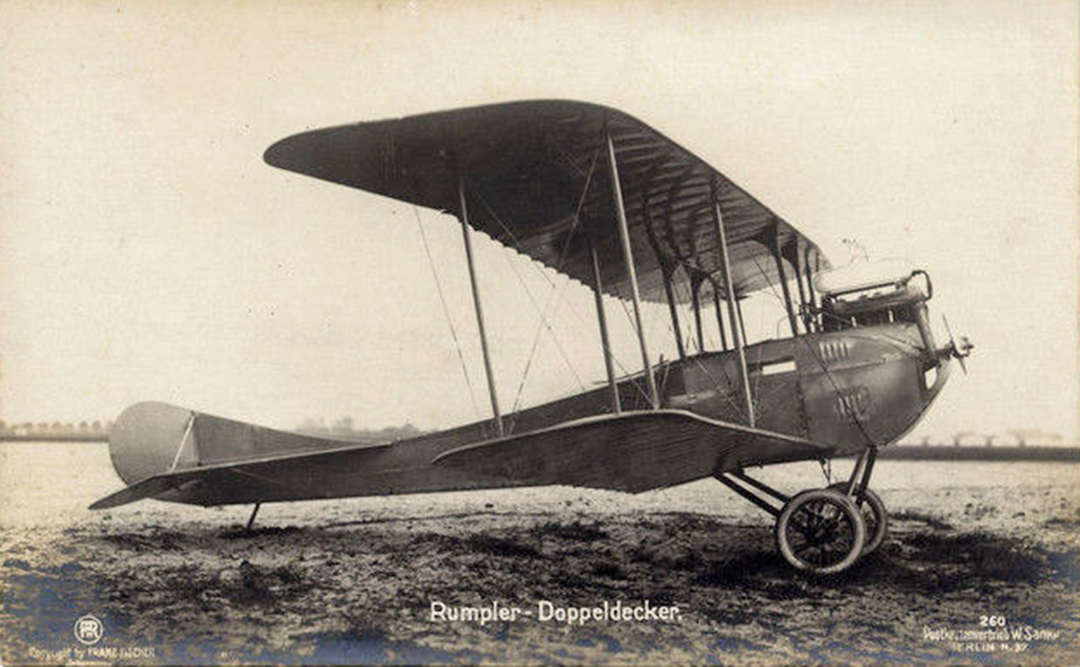
Rumpler C.I on Sanke card

Willi Sanke published a series of about 600-700 numbered photo-postcards, showing World War I aviators c. 1910 - 1918/20.

== Overview ==
Willi was based in Berlin and his cards were often issued under the name of Postkartenvertrieb W. Sanke (Post Card Distribution W. Sanke).

On some of these postcards, the photographers are identified: for example, Fritz Fischer, Nicola Perscheid (1864–1930), and Alfred Krauth.

== See also ==
- List of World War I flying aces
