= Monumental Cemetery of Rimini =

Cemetery in Rimini, Italy

Cimitero Monumentale di Rimini
- Interactive map of Cimitero Monumentale di Rimini

Details
- Established: 28 May 1813; 213 years ago
- Location: Rimini
- Country: Italy
- Coordinates: 44°4′16.96″N 12°32′54.48″E
- Type: Public
- Owned by: Comune di Rimini
- Find a Grave: Cimitero Monumentale di Rimini

The Monumental Cemetery of Rimini (Italian: Cimitero monumentale di Rimini), also known as the Civic Cemetery of Rimini (Cimitero civico di Rimini), is the main cemetery in the city of Rimini, in the region of Emilia-Romagna, northern Italy.

Consecrated in 1813, the Monumental Cemetery of Rimini is the final resting place of several prominent Riminese figures, most notably filmmaker Federico Fellini.

== History ==
On 12 June 1804, Napoleon Bonaparte promulgated the Edict of Saint-Cloud (French: Décret Impérial sur les Sépultures), which decreed that cemeteries should be placed outside city walls, in sunny and airy places, with similar tombs in an egalitarian fashion. The edict was motivated by public hygiene and a concern for egalitarianism in death. On 5 September 1806, the Edict on Medical Police (Italian: Editto della Polizia Medica) extended the Edict of Saint-Cloud's provisions to Napoleonic Italy, evoking a public debate which notably led to the publication of Ugo Foscolo's poem Dei Sepolcri (1807). Rimini had long been accustomed to burials in churches or their churchyards, with sixteen city churches having a cemetery of some kind. The largest cemetery surrounded the Tempio Malatestiano, and there was a Jewish cemetery outside Porta Montanara.

Rimini's municipal government considered siting the new cemetery at the suppressed Convent of St Mary of Graces on the Covignano hill, but the proposal was unpopular. Another proposed location was in the Colonnella area. By March 1808, it had been decided to site the cemetery in the Celle area. The locality had been used for burials for centuries: its name derived from an oratory (cella) that had been tasked since the 12th century with the burial of executed prisoners, who would be displayed for maximum exposure near the branching of the ancient Roman roads Via Aemilia and Via Popilia. The municipal government purchased five plots of agrarian land, forming a square area of marshland. The area was dried, surrounded by a wall, and above the entrance arch was inscribed: "Ouch! Miserable theatre! Ouch! Human splendour!" (Ahi! misero teatro! ahi! fasto umano!).

The cemetery was consecrated on 28 May 1813 by Gualfardo Ridolfi, Bishop of Rimini. The first burial was Giuseppe Receputi, a 25-day-old baby, on 3 June 1813.

The cemetery's crematorium was inaugurated on 19 April 2016, and began operation on 21 July 2016 alongside a Sala del Commiato. In January 2019, the cemetery had nearly 1,500 burial places available, the most for any cemetery in Rimini, followed by Santa Maria in Cerreto with 226 places.

== Layout ==
The cemetery contains tree-lined avenues and several noble chapels. Its paths are paved in bush-hammered cubes of smooth porphyry. The square immediately inside the cemetery walls features two triangles of smooth porphyry divided by a diagonal.

To the south, the cemetery is bounded by the Bologna–Ancona railway, leading Fellini to describe it as one of the "least gloomy places in the city, due to the joyful presence of the train that passes nearby".

== Notable funerary monuments ==
=== La grande prua ===
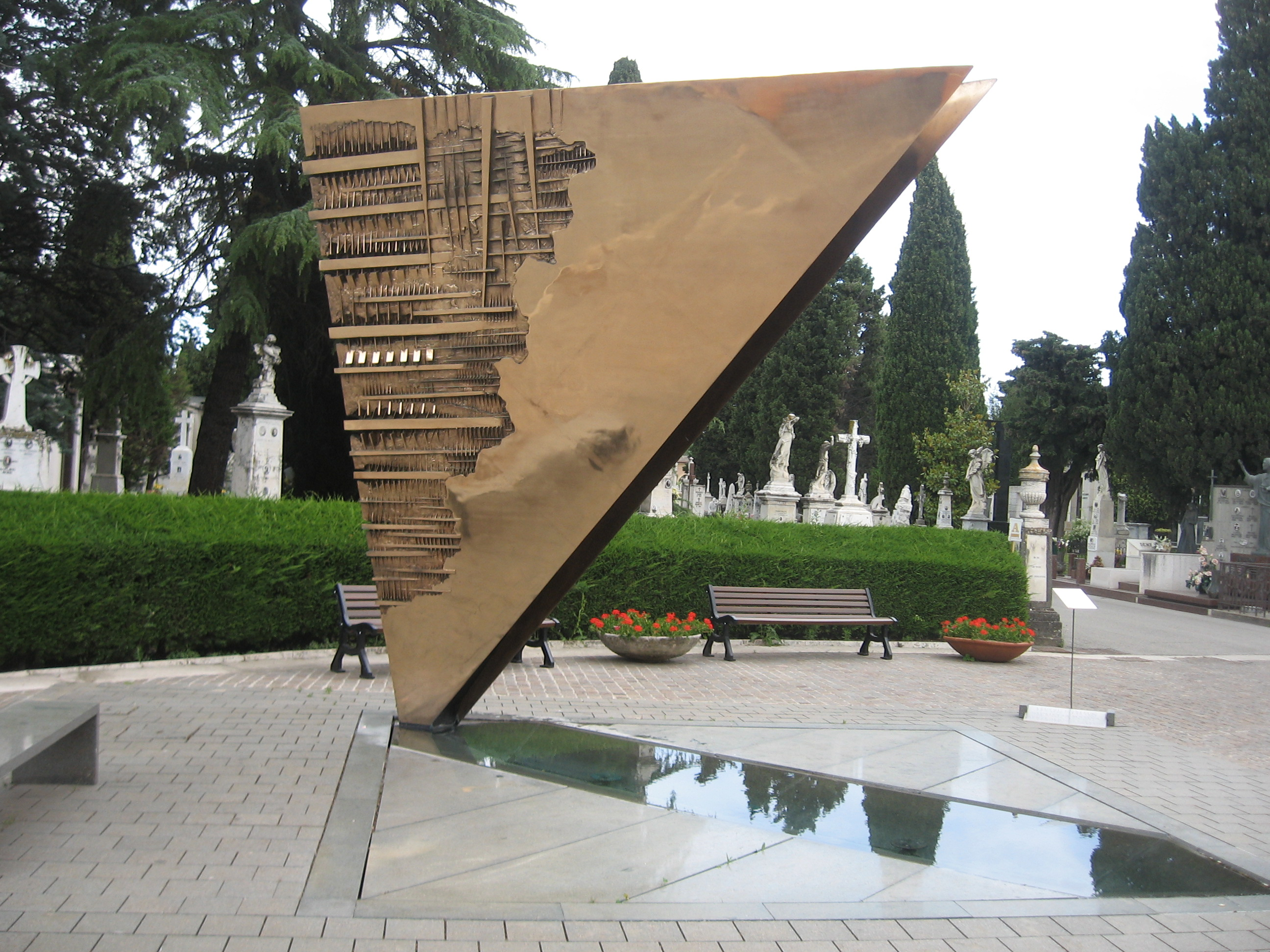
La grande prua, the funerary monument of Federico Fellini sculpted by Arnaldo Pomodoro, in May 2012

Under commission from Rimini's municipal government, Arnaldo Pomodoro sculpted Fellini's funerary monument by the cemetery's entrance. Known as La grande prua (The Great Bow), the monument is an inverted bronze double-triangle, affixed by a narrow point to the ground. It takes the form of a ship's bow above a water basin, to which water is channelled from the monument itself, with the water system operated from an underground technical room. In the words of Matteo Sintini, an architect, the structure yields a dramatic "impulse of verticality". The monument is inspired by the nautical themes in Fellini's films Amarcord (1973), set in Rimini, and And the Ship Sails On (1983), and described by Pomodoro as "cut[ting] an ideal path through the land, the water, the air: for me, it represents the greatness and very glory of Fellini's work". Fellini is buried with his wife, actress Giulietta Masina, and their son Pierfederico, who died a few days after birth.

In November 2019, the water basin was damaged after an 80-year-old man from Riccione crashed his car into the monument. The monument was restored in 2023 by the Pomodoro Foundation, with the removal of oxidised parts and the restoration of patina. In January 2020, the only known copy of the monument was installed in Piazzetta Lorenzetti, in the skiing resort of Madonna di Campiglio.

=== Other funerary monuments ===
The funerary moment of René Gruau consists of a mosaic of a stylised woman's face on white marble floor circle, with a bronze stele emerging vertically from the marble, containing Gruau's signature and surmounted by an asterisk. The monument was designed by architect Pier Luigi Foschi and artist Vittorio d'Augusta, and resides by the cemetery's entrance, in symmetry with La grande prua. Gruau's ashes and those of his son were inaugurated behind the monument on 31 March 2009, having previously been buried at a different location in the cemetery.

Unveiled in September 2015, the funerary monument of Riminese photographer Marco Pesaresi was designed by Jader Bonfiglioli, and consists of a sarcophagus of rough natural travertine slabs, on which sits a steel cross with a Plexiglass sheet on the left arm as a symbol of the Holy Shroud. Pesaresi is not buried at the cemetery: his ashes are scattered in the Adriatic Sea.

Renzo Pasolini's motorbike helmet and some testimonies of his victories are sited at his tomb. On the tomb of Catholic priest Giuseppe Maioli is a marble sculpture by Paola Ceccarelli of a man with outstretched arms, inspired by a drawing from Maioli on the day of his ordination. In September 2022, a stele dedicated to actress Clara Calamai was unveiled behind La grande prua.

== Notable burials ==
- Amintore Galli (1845–1919), music publisher, musicologist, and composer
- Piero Guardigli Bagli (1898–1946), painter and sculptor
- Marina Polazzi (1892–1965), opera soprano
- Renzo Pasolini (1938–73), Grand Prix motorcycle racer
- Federico Fellini (1920–93), filmmaker
- Giulietta Masina (1921–94), actress and wife of Fellini
- Margherita Zoebeli (1912–96), educator and pedagogist
- Clara Calamai (1915–98), actress
- René Gruau (1909–2004), fashion illustrator
- Oreste Benzi (1926–2007), Catholic priest and founder of the Pope John XXIII Community
- Amedeo Montemaggi (1923–2011), historian of the Gothic Line
- Giuseppe Maioli (1947–2016), Catholic priest associated with Communion and Liberation
- Sergio Zavoli (1923–2020), documentary and sports journalist and senator

== See also ==
- Coriano Ridge War Cemetery – a Commonwealth War Graves Commission cemetery in nearby Coriano, numbering 1,939 burials from the Second World War
- List of cemeteries in italy
