= Arthur Benda =

German photographer

Arthur Benda (23 March 1885, in Berlin – 7 September 1969, in Vienna) was a German photographer. From 1907 to 1938 he worked in the photo studio d'Ora in Vienna, from 1921 as a partner of Dora Kallmus and from 1927 under the name d'Ora-Benda as the sole owner.

== Biography ==
Arthur Benda was an apprentice to photographer Nicola Perscheid from 1899 to 1902 and learned the techniques of colour photography and fine print. In an improvised photo lab in his parents' house, he deepened his practical knowledge, made his first colored rubber prints and experimented with the development of different shades. After completing his apprenticeship, he remained with Perscheid as laboratory manager and assistant.

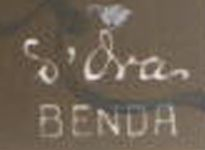
Signature on a d'Ora Benda photo

In 1906, Arthur Benda met photographer Dora Kallmus, who also trained with Perscheid. When she opened the Atelier d'Ora on Wipplingerstrasse in Vienna in 1907, Benda became her assistant. The Atelier d'Ora specialized in portrait and fashion photography. Kallmus and Benda quickly made a name for themselves and soon supplied the most important magazines. The peak of renown was reached when Madame d'Ora photographed the present nobility in 1916 on the occasion of the coronation of Emperor Charles I as King of Hungary.

In 1921, Arthur Benda became a partner in Atelier d'Ora, which also ran a branch in Karlovy Vary during the season. In 1927 Arthur Benda took over the studio of Dora Kallmus, who had run a second studio in Paris since 1925, and continued it under the name d'Ora-Benda together with his wife Hanny Mittler. In addition to portraits, he mainly photographed nudes that made the new company name known in men's magazines worldwide. A major order from the King of Albania Zogu I, who had himself and his family photographed in 1937 for three weeks by Arthur Benda in Tirana secured Arthur Benda financially. In 1938 he opened a new studio at the Kärntnerring in Vienna, which he continued to operate under his own name after the Second World War.

Arthur Benda died of a stroke in 1969 in a Viennese hospital.
