= Patrick Blondeau =

French footballer (born 1968)

Personal information
- Date of birth: 27 January 1968 (age 58)
- Place of birth: Marseille, Bouches-du-Rhône, France
- Height: 1.74 m (5 ft 9 in)
- Position: Right-back

Senior career*
Years	Team	Apps	(Gls)
1987–1989	FC Martigues	50	(1)
1989–1997	Monaco	148	(3)
1997–1998	Sheffield Wednesday	6	(0)
1998	Bordeaux	9	(0)
1998–2001	Marseille	78	(0)
2001–2002	Watford	24	(0)
2002–2005	US Créteil	58	(0)
Total		373	(4)

International career
1997	France	2	(0)
- * Club domestic league appearances and goals

Patrick Blondeau (born 27 January 1968) is a French former professional footballer who played as a right-back in Ligue 1 and the Premier League. He also made two appearances for the France national team.

== Career ==
Born in Marseille, Bouches-du-Rhône, Blondeau began playing professional football with nearby FC Martigues in Ligue 2. He played for Jean Tigana for several years at AS Monaco. He was a key part of the side that won the 1996–97 Ligue 1 title.

For the 1997–98 season Blondeau signed with Sheffield Wednesday for a transfer fee of £1.8 million. He did not settle in Sheffield and returned to France in January 1998.

Blondeau captained his local club, Olympique de Marseille, for three seasons in the prime of his career, and was in the side that lost 3–0 to Parma in the 1998–99 UEFA Cup final. During his time at Marseille, he made a violent tackle on Yves Deroff, who suffered a double-broken leg, in a league match against FC Nantes on 29 May 1999. Blondeau received only a yellow card during the match, but the league later suspended him for six matches.

== Personal life ==
Blondeau was married to fashion designer Véronika Loubry until 2016. They have two children: a daughter, model Thylane Blondeau (born 5 April 2001); and a son, Ayrton Blondeau (born 20 May 2007).
