= Violet Grey =

Beauty Retailer

- Industry: Consumer goods
- Founded: 2013
- Founder: Cassandra Grey
- Headquarters: Los Angeles
- Products: Beauty
- Website: www.violetgrey.com

Violet Grey is a Los Angeles based luxury beauty products retailer and content site founded in 2013 by Cassandra Grey. The company combines magazine style content and shopping for beauty products.

Violet Grey hosts a magazine style blog called the Violet Files, where beauty insiders and celebrities discuss the products they use. In March 2021 this was presented as a 16-question interview with Virgil Abloh

== History ==
Violet Grey was acquired by Farfetch in 2022. In September 2024, the company returned to founder-led ownership when Cassandra Grey reacquired the company alongside private equity investor Sherif Guirgis, who assumed the roles of Chairman and Chief Executive Officer.

In early 2025, Violet Grey completed the acquisition of The Detox Market, a curated clean beauty retailer with locations in the U.S. and Canada.

The company opened a flagship store on Madison Avenue in New York City in June 2025 and established a shop-in-shop at the luxury retailer Hirshleifers in Manhasset, New York.

In April 2026, Violet Grey announced its UK launch, including an experiential installation at British department store Harvey Nichols.

== Collaborations ==
Violet Grey has partnered with Jasmine Tookes, Melanie Griffith, January Jones, Kim Kardashian, and Rosie Huntington-Whiteley.

Emma Roberts had a Violet Grey photoshoot when she was six months pregnant.
