= Jean-Daniel Lorieux =

French photographer (born 1937)

- Lorieux in 2011
- Born: 1937 (age 88–89); Paris, France
- Education: Institut catholique d'arts et métiers; Cours Simon
- Known for: Fashion photography
- Awards: Ordre des Arts et des Lettres (1997); Legion of Honour (2003)

Jean-Daniel Lorieux (born 1937) is a French fashion photographer known for his work with Vogue and L'Officiel, he has been nicknamed the "fashion maestro."

== Biography ==
Lorieux was born in 1937 in Paris, France. Born into a family of industralists (Famille Lorieux) he studied engineering at the Institut catholique d'arts et métiers then acting at the Cours Simon. From 1959 he worked as a war photographer and filmmaker in Mostaganem during the Algerian War. Following this he began his career in fashion photography as an assistant at Studio Harcourt. Following his time at Studio Harcourt he began working for Vogue Paris and L'Officiel. In 1988 he photographed the election campaign of Jacques Chirac. In 2008 he adapted The Master and Margarita into a photographic series featuring Isabelle Adjani.

Associated with the Factory, AnOther described his work as being "driven by the pursuit of palm tree-strewn sunsets, azure seas and extraordinarily beautiful women". Over the course of his career he has photographed advertising campaigns for Christian Dior, Lanvin, Céline, Pierre Cardin and photographed numerous personalities including Nicole de Lamargé, Stephanie Seymour, Nelson Mandela, Dalida, Yasmeen Ghauri, Karen Mulder, Salvador Dalí, Claudia Schiffer, and Serge Gainsbourg. He launched the modelling career of Cécilia Ciganer-Albéniz. There is a permanent collection of his work in the Maison européenne de la photographie.

== Personal life ==
Lorieux was engaged to Cécilia Ciganer-Albéniz. He has one son with American model Triffina 'Triffie' Hout, Nickolas Lorieux who also works as a fashion photographer.

== Awards and decorations ==
- Chevalier de l'Ordre des Arts et des Lettres (1997)
- Chevalier de Legion d'Honneur (2003)
- First Prize, Festival international de mode et de photographie (2005)

== Bibliography ==
- Coconuts (Éditions Love Me Tender, 1982 – with Jean-François Leroy)
- Écran total (Éditions du May, 2001 – with Irène Frain)
- Confidences d'un voleur d'instants (Michel Lafon, 2008 – preface by Michel Lafon)
- Sunstroke (Gourcuff Gradenigo, 2014 – preface by Leïla Menchari)

== Filmography ==
=== Film ===
Year	Title	Director	Note	Ref.
1974	Du blé en liasses	Alain Brunet	Art department	

=== Television ===
Year	Title	Note	Ref.
2003	Lola, qui es-tu Lola?	Art director	

=== Music videos ===
Year	Title	Artist	Note	Ref.
1986	"Ouragan"	Princess Stéphanie of Monaco	Director	

== Exhibitions ==
His work has been exhibited worldwide, mostly in the United States and Europe.

- Hôtel de Ville, Paris (1991)
- Palais des congrès de Paris, Paris (2003)
- Festival international de mode et de photographie, Hyères (2005)
- The Master and Margarita, Moscow Museum of Modern Art, Moscow (2007)
- Palais des Festivals et des Congrès, Cannes (2012)
- L'Alliance New York, New York City (2014)
- Shanghai Photo, Shanghai (2014)
- Photofairs Shanghai, Shanghai (2015)
- True Blue, Production Berlin, Berlin (29 April–11 June 2016)
- Sous le Soleil Exactement, Leclaireur Boissy d'Anglas, Paris (24 June–4 July 2016)
- Cannes Film Festival, Cannes (2016)
- Fashion & Celebrity by Willy Rizzo and Jean-Daniel Lorieux, Shanghai (2016)
- Azul Azul, Gandia Blasco, Madrid (8 June–31 July 2021)
- Nag Gallery, Paris (2019)
