= Henry B. Goodwin =

Swedish photographer and linguist

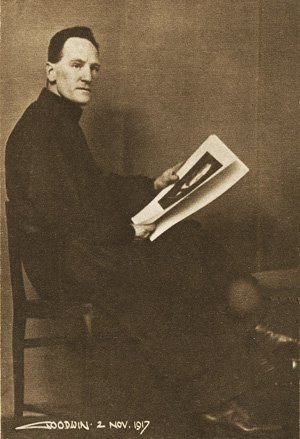
Henry B. Goodwin.

Henry Buergel Goodwin (February 20, 1878 – September 11, 1931) was a German-born Swedish photographer and linguist.

Goodwin was born in Munich, Germany, as Heinrich Karl Hugo Bürgel. His father Hugo Bürgel (1853–1903) was a landscape painter. He studied Nordic languages at the University of Leipzig, graduating in 1903 with a Ph.D. thesis on the Icelandic manuscript Konungsannáll. Annales Islandorum Regii. While in Leipzig, he also learned to photograph in the studio of Nicola Perscheid.

In 1903, he married Hildegard Gassner, and the following year, they moved to Uppsala in Sweden, where Goodwin held a position as lecturer in German at Uppsala University from 1906 until 1909. With his move to Sweden, where he was naturalised in 1908, he also began to anglicise his name: he first added the "Goodwin" surname and omitted the Umlaut, changing "Bürgel" to "Buergel", and in 1907, he changed "Heinrich" to "Henry" and henceforth went by the name "Henry B. Goodwin". In 1909, he was divorced from Hildegard, who would move back to Germany with their three children three years later. Only a short time later, Goodwin wed Ida Helander, née Engelke (1874–1963), a teacher from Stockholm.

When his academic career did not really advance, Goodwin began concentrating more on photography. In 1913 he organised a photography course given by Nicola Perscheid, and from 1916 on, he worked as a professional photographer with his own studio. Goodwin became known as Sweden's foremost pictorialist photographer, and his works were exhibited and acclaimed internationally.
