= Kazumi Kurigami =

Japanese photographer

Kazumi Kurigami (操上 和美, Kurigami Kazumi; born 1936) is a commercial and fine art Japanese photographer.

== Bibliography ==
- Alternates, New York:Rizzoli (1984) ISBN 0-8478-0532-8
