= Thylane Blondeau =

French model and actress (born 2001)

- Born: Thylane Léna-Rose Loubry Blondeau; 5 April 2001 (age 25); Aix-en-Provence, France
- Occupations: Model, actress
- Years active: 2005–present
- Spouse: Ben Attal (m. 2026)
- Parent: Patrick Blondeau (father) Véronika Loubry (mother)
- Modeling information
- Height: 1.70 m (5 ft 7 in)
- Hair color: Brown
- Eye color: Blue
- Agency: IMG Models (New York, Paris, Milan, London, Los Angeles); Uno Models (Barcelona); Success (Paris) (2005–2016)

Thylane Léna-Rose Loubry Blondeau (born 5 April 2001) is a French model. Blondeau started modeling at a very young age, and in 2006, was elected "Most Beautiful Girl in The World" by Vogue Enfants. She has modeled for many designers, including Dolce & Gabbana, L'Oréal and Versace.

In 2018, she founded her own clothing brand, Heaven May, and topped TC Candler's "100 Most Beautiful Faces."

== Early life ==
Thylane Blondeau was born in Aix-en-Provence, France. She is the daughter of Patrick Blondeau, a footballer, and Véronika Loubry, an actress and television presenter. She has a younger brother, Ayrton Blondeau. Their parents Véronika and Patrick married in 2002 and divorced in 2016.

== Career ==
=== Modeling ===
Blondeau began modelling at the age of 4, walking on the runway for French designer Jean Paul Gaultier and later for famous designers like Dolce & Gabbana, babylos, and L'Oréal. In 2006, the supplement of French fashion magazine Vogue, Vogue Enfants, designated her "the most beautiful little girl in the world". She had her first photoshoot at seven years old with photographer Dani Brubaker and would become the photographer's muse. Brubaker cast her in multiple campaigns for Hugo Boss and other children fashion campaigns. She represented the French modelling agency success kids between 2005 and 2016.

When she was 10, Blondeau was involved in a controversy over the sexualisation of children in advertising and the media when she appeared in adult clothing and make-up for the Vogue Paris supplement Vogue Enfants.

At age 13, she appeared on the cover of the magazine Jalouse.

In 2015, she signed with IMG Models. She walked the runway for Dolce & Gabbana.

In 2016, Blondeau posed for Flaunt Magazine with her longtime photographer Dani Brubaker.

In 2017, she became a brand ambassador for L'Oreal Paris. She starred alongside Zendaya, Lucky Blue Smith and Presley Gerber in the Dolce & Gabbana millennial-themed spring/summer 2017 campaign.

In 2018, she founded her own clothing brand, Heaven May.

In December 2018, Thylane placed first in the annual "Independent Critics List of the 100 Most Beautiful Faces of 2018". It was her fifth consecutive appearance on the prestigious global list, having been 84th in 2014, 28th in 2015, fifth in 2016, second in 2017, and fourth in 2019.

=== Acting ===
Blondeau made her acting debut playing the role of Gabriele in the film Belle & Sebastian: The Adventure Continues (2015).

== Personal life ==
Blondeau married Benjamin Attal, an entrepreneur specialising in fashion (not to be confused with French actor Ben Attal), in a town hall ceremony in Paris on 30 June 2026. The couple had announced their engagement in March 2026.

== Filmography ==
Title	Year	Role	Director	Notes
Belle & Sebastian: The Adventure Continues	2015	Gabrielle	Christian Duguay	
The Loneliest Boy in the World	2022	Elgar	Martin Owen	Uncredited
Helvellyn Edge	2022		Joah Jordan	
