= Mira Cirul =

Latvian dancer

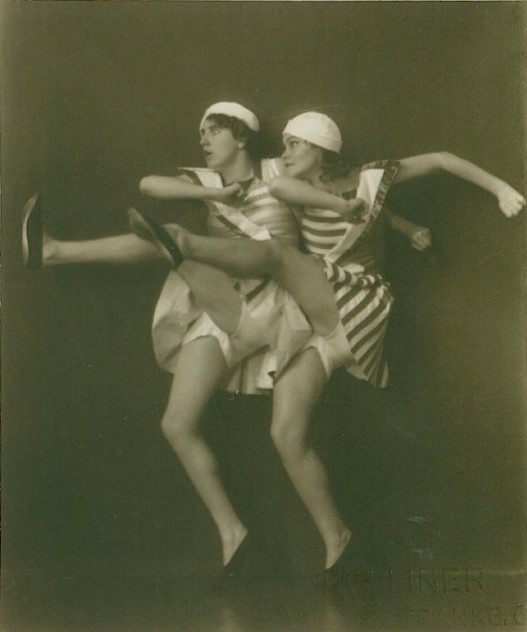
Mila Cirul and Hedy Pfundmayr, 1928

Mila Cirul (1901 - 1967 or 1977) was a Latvian dancer. "Cirul liked to dance violent, passionate modes of feeling, often with music (Bach, Handel) seldom associated with violence or passion".

== Life ==
Born in Riga, Cirul trained in classical dance with Mikhail Mordkin, also studying the system of expression of François Delsarte and the 'biomechanics' of Vsevolod Meyerhold. In 1918 Cirul began studying modern dance with Ellen Tels. After she debuted as a dancer in Russia, Lenin was among her admirers. In 1919 she accompanied Ellen Tels to Austria, and danced with her in Austria and Germany. Cirul met Mary Wigman in Frankfurt in 1926, and under her influence explored solitary dance, understood as submission to forces of the unconscious. She was a soloist at operas in Vienna, Hanover and Berlin, and in 1930 performed with Margarethe Wallmann Tänzer-Kollektiv in Berlin.

In 1932, she settled in Paris, where she opened a dance school. There she collaborated with the poet and critic Fernand Divoire. In 1934 she performed a highly successful version of Richard Strauss's opera Salome at the Théâtre des Champs-Élysées. She danced duets with her sister Elia, like Tentation (1935), with scenario by Divoire, which dramatized the struggle between consciousness and the unconscious.

Cirul continued dancing until the early 1940s, and taught dance until 1962, when she retired to Nice.
