= Harry Peccinotti =

Harry Peccinotti (also known as Harri Peccinotti) (born 1935) is an English photographer, best known for his erotic work, most famously two Pirelli Calendars published in 1968 and 1969. He remains an influential figure in art and fashion photography.

His work as art director of the UK fashion magazine Nova is widely considered as being influential for its graphic design as well as photography. He published a retrospective of his life's work called book HP (2009).

== Career ==
Born in London, his career ranged during the 1950s from commercial artist to musician. At this time he designed record sleeves for Esquire Records and book jackets for Penguin, and later became an advertising art director and photographer.

Peccinotti was one of a number of art directors at agencies such as Crawford’s and J Walter Thompson. In 1965 he was hired as the first Art director of Nova magazine, remembered today for its innovative design, typography, subject matter, photography and quality of writing. Besides his role as art director, he also made photographs for the magazine. At Nova, Peccinotti became one of the first professional fashion photographers to photograph and publish photos of black models, using them extensively in his fashion shoots.

He stated in an interview:

Nova started as an experiment. The thinking behind it came from the fact that there were no magazines at the time for intelligent women. All the magazines treated women like they were drudges and housewives, and focused on subjects like cooking and knitting. But the women's liberation movement was strong at the time and there were a lot of good female writers. Nova's aim was to talk about what women were really interested in: politics, careers, health, sex. George Newnes, a large press company, threw some money in, just to see if anyone was interested in a magazine like that, and so it started.

He also art directed Flair, Vanity Fair, Rolling Stone and Vogue. He quit art-directing to become a full-time photographer, still creating content for many of the same magazines. His list of regular magazine commissioners grew to include Vogue, Elle, Marie Claire, Town, Queen, and Rolling Stone.

In the 1970s, Peccinotti provided front-cover illustrations for the Penguin Books edition of the works of D. H. Lawrence.

Peccinotti is also known for his collaborative design of French daily newspaper Le Matin, with David Hillman. In 1993, they both co-authored an anthology of Nova's best covers and photography titled Nova 1965–1975, along with David Gibbs.

Peccinotti lives in Paris and continues to have his work in French Vogue, Russian Vogue, Gloss and 10 Magazine. He has received a number of awards in England and America for both art direction and photography.

== Style ==
His work typically features close up shots of the female form and the face in particular and is sensual. The images are suggestive, for example, making a fetish of lips and smoking but not overtly pornographic.

A notable example of his style during the 1970s are his book covers for Penguin, including a series of Iris Murdoch novels which features unusually cropped, striking pictures of women models with make up in vivid colours. More recent work includes a fashion shoot for L'Officiel magazine.

== Pirelli calendars ==
He achieved particular renown for his erotic imagery for two Pirelli calendars −1968 and 1969– with designer Derek Birdsall. The 1968 calendar, shot in Tunisia, pioneered non-traditional pin-up images, which focused details such as a wisp of hair against the neck or a profile bathed in light. The imagery for the 1969 calendar was shot in California without the use of professional models.

The 1968 calendar was shot during a period when, Peccinotti says, the mere hint of a nipple would prove problematic to publish. Yet 50 years on Beady Eye, Liam Gallagher's new band used a photo from the 1968 calendar for the cover of their BE album only to have it censored in supermarkets and resorting to covering the offending nipple with a sticker.
