= Clara 3000 =

Clara Deshayes known professionally as Clara 3000 is a French DJ, musician, and actress.

== Biography ==
Clara Deshayes grew up in Versailles. She became an intern at the Ed Banger Records label and was quickly sponsored by Pedro Winter. She played in Parisian clubs, particularly Silencio where she was a resident before achieving wider recognition.

In 2008, she opened for the group Justice.

In 2014, in Mia Hansen-Løve's film Eden, she played a character that the director symbolized the new generation of DJs.

In 2014, she signed to the Kill the DJ label.

In 2015, she gained more visibility and became a representative of the Jacquemus brand.

In the fall of 2015, thanks to her first remix, Idle Eyes for the group C.A.R., she was described by Les Inrockuptibles magazine as one of the eight female artists reinventing global electronic music.

In 2016, she met Demna Gvasalia, artistic director of the Vetements and Balenciaga brands. She became his model for Balenciaga and responsible for the soundtracks of his fashion shows.

In 2022, she opened for Indochine in Lyon as part of the Central Tour.

== Discography ==
=== Remixes ===
- 2014 : C.A.R. - Idle Eyes (Clara 3000 Remix)
- 2016 : Krista Papista - I Wish I Had Blue Eyes (Clara 3000 Remix)
- 2016 : Christophe - Stella Botox (Clara 3000 Remix)

== Filmography ==
- 2014: Eden by Mia Hansen-Løve: DJ Silence
- 2018: Caprice of King Cydulkin: Anne
- 2019: Lux æterna of Gaspar Noé: Clara
- 2023: Orlando, ma biographie politique de Paul B. Preciado
