= Madame Agnès =

French milliner

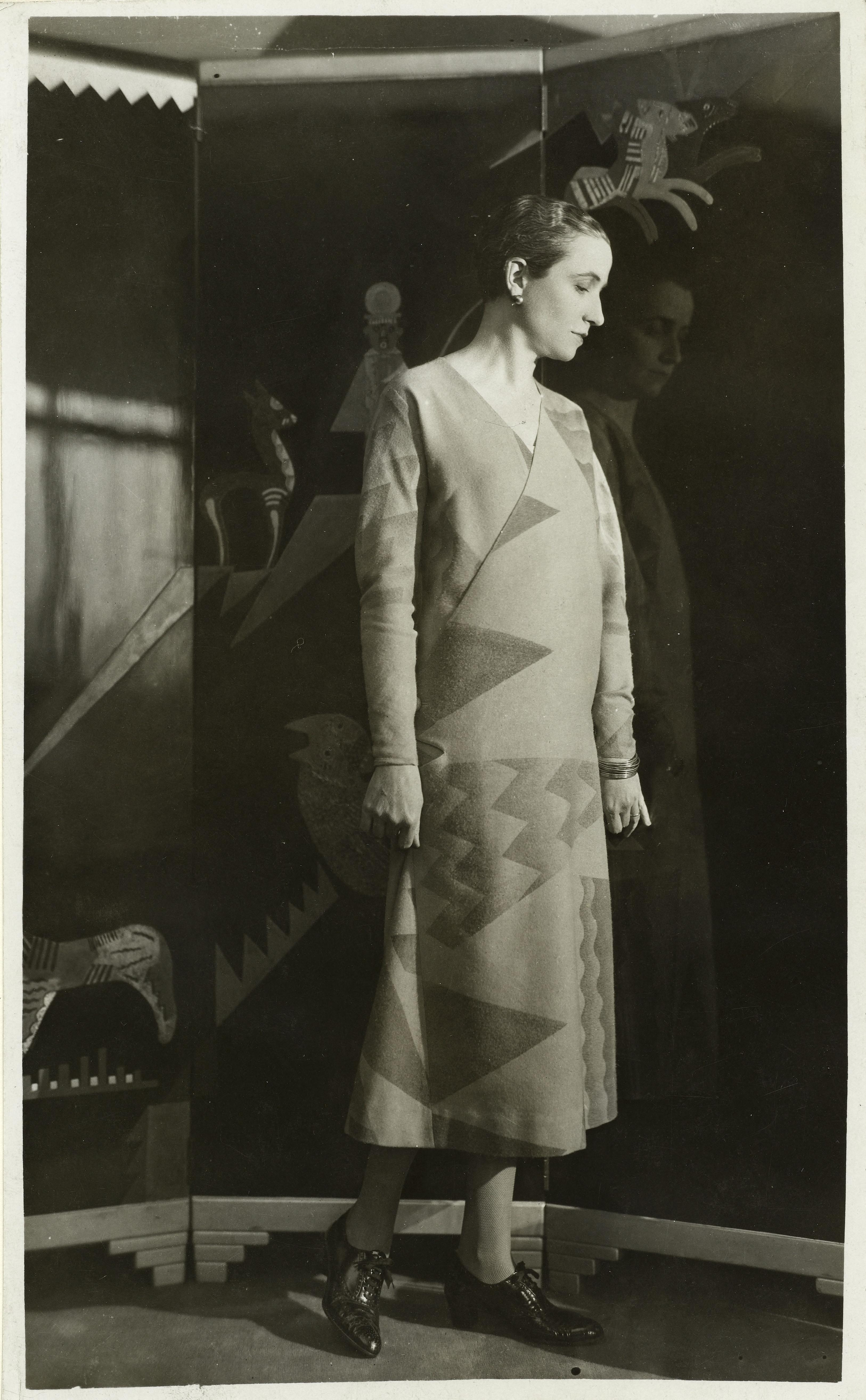
- Occupations: Milliner, sculptor
- Years active: 1920s–1940s
- Known for: Abstract and unique hat designs
- Style: Avant-garde

Madame Agnès was a French milliner who designed hats that were popular from the late 1920s until the 1940s. Her shop was located on the Rue Saint-Honoré.

A sculptor, she associated with people in the art circles of Paris, France. Madame Agnes styled hats that were both abstract and unique.

She preferred wearing only black fashions. In 1929, Madame Agnes wore black satin frocks designed by Vionnet. Her clothes were embellished with bright jewelry like red coral, jade or lapis lazuli.

== Hat designer ==
An illustration from 1927 depicts Madame Agnes' Congo inspired hats with a model wearing a slave collar. In December 1935 she introduced hats with large straw brims which were mounted on flowered madras handkerchiefs. Madame Agnes was inspired by a matador's hat when she created a small dinner hat for Spring 1936. It was sewn of black maline with heavy white silk fringe. The fringe was mounted on each side of the hat's top. In mid-1946 she created a soft beige beret of felt which featured a line that was broken just above the right eyebrow, where a soft quill was inserted.
