= Sarah Thomas (model) =

British fashion model and nutritionist (born 1980)

- Born: 17 March 1980 (age 46); Swardeston, Norfolk, England
- Occupations: Fashion model; nutritionist
- Years active: 1995–1998
- Spouse: Daniel Leo
- Children: 2
- Modeling information
- Height: 5 ft 11 in (180 cm)
- Hair color: Dark blonde
- Eye color: Blue

Sarah Thomas (born 17 March 1980) is an English nutritionist and former fashion model. Scouted by Eileen Ford of the Ford Modelling Agency, she appeared in various magazines and modelled for multi-national fashion brands headquartered in the United States, the United Kingdom, France, Germany, Japan and Italy. Thomas left the international catwalk scene full-time in late 1998, citing the degrading treatment of girl models and the prevalence of drug use and eating disorders in her field of work.

== Personal life ==
Thomas was born on 17 March 1980, in the small village of Swardeston, which is close to Norwich, Norfolk, to Christine and Peter Thomas. Both of her parents operated a petrol station and motor repair garage in Swardeston. She has one elder brother. She was educated at the independent Norwich Cathedral School, studying design technology, mathematics and physics, and achieving GCSE grades of six As and three Bs. Thomas dropped out of the school in February 1997, just before her A-level examinations so that she could focus on her modelling career. Thomas is married to the professional rugby player Daniel Leo and has two children with him.

== Modelling ==
While watching her father play cricket in Swardeston when she was at the age of thirteen, she was scouted by someone from the Ford Modelling Agency in an English catalogue, and was sent on a modelling course to improve her confidence. Thomas was not selected to appear on the cover of Company magazine and was told by them that she had to appear "sexy" and was unsure as to what they meant. She was signed by Eileen Ford and the Beatrice International Models at the age of fourteen, and walked on the London Fashion Week aged fifteen. Thomas ventured to Paris in June 1996, where she modelled for Karl Lagerfeld, Chanel and travelled to Hamburg to model for the German designer Jil Sander. She subsequently modelled for Ralph Lauren in New York City during a half-term holiday, and was featured in an issue of Vanity Fair magazine in December 1996, as a means of earning capital outside of her schooling. Thomas received an offer to read the script for a film but she rejected the offer because she had no acting skills.

Her father lent her his support since she could not continue her education and do modelling simultaneously. Travelling around the world modelling affected her skin completion and she was treated by a dermatologist. Thomas earned the attention of the international CoverGirl cosmetics company, who offered her the position of being its new cover girl in place of Helena Christensen. She initially declined the offer, telling them that she would not travel to the United States for an audition at the behest of talent scouts from CoverGirl because she believed she would not receive the job. Thomas would later sign a two-year contract with the company, appearing in television commercials that were broadcast worldwide. She also earned a contract to advertise Pantene shampoo on television commercials in the United States.

She went on to model for several American, British, French, German, Japanese and Italian fashion houses and appeared in magazines such as Harper's Bazaar by Patrick Demarchelier, Italian Marie Claire, D, Girlfriend, L'Officiel, Elle, Seventeen and Vogue Paris. She had endorsements contracts to advertise products from the multinational brands Cartier and Revlon. Thomas and the actress Lucy Gordon were instrumental in bringing into the fashion industry the "English rose" appearance, described as "styled and naturally coloured hair paired with pale, often freckled skin, bold rose colour on cheeks and lips but minimal makeup elsewhere on the face."

== Post-modelling life ==
In late 1998, she left the international catwalk scene full-time to focus on advertising and photography. Thomas criticised the modelling fashion world as "sleazy", because of the degrading treatment of girl models and the prevalence of eating disorders, drug use and alcoholism within that industry. Pressure to keep her weight low and an irregular diet of food from hotels and in-flights made her unwell. With an interest in food and aptitude in science, in 2000, she began a three-year diploma course at London's UK College of Nutrition and Health in order to begin a career as a nutritionist, and found a job working as a nutrition advisor in the health department of a department store. Thomas wrote a food column and represented her career in modelling as less important than it was.
