= Bruno Bisang =

Swiss fashion photographer

Bruno Bisang (born 1952 in Ascona, Switzerland) is a Swiss fashion photographer. His photography has been seen in features of many international magazines, such as Vogue, Cosmopolitan, Max, GQ and Amica, and he has shot advertising campaigns for various major fashion and beauty labels, including Chanel, Wolford, Guerlain, Palmers and Givenchy.

== Career ==
Bisang studied photography at the School of Applied Arts in Zurich. After an apprenticeship, he started to work as a freelance photographer in 1979, first in Zurich, later also in Milan and Munich. Throughout his career, he has been able to shoot in Germany, South Africa, the Caribbean, South America, Miami, New York, and Asia. Today he lives and works in Zurich, Milan, Paris and New York City.

== Solo exhibitions ==
- Espace Picto Bastille, Paris, 2005
- Pandora Gallery, Marbella, Spain, 2005
- Camerawork, Hamburg, 2005
- Kaune, Sudendorf Gallery, Cologne, 2011
- Young Gallery, Brussels, 2004 and 2011
- The Little Black Gallery, London, 2012
- Kaune, Posnik, Spohr Gallery, Cologne, 2014

== Publications ==
- Photographs, 2000, teNeues Verlag, ISBN 3-8238-5451-8
- Exposure, 2004, teNeues Verlag, ISBN 3-8238-4598-5
- 30 Years of Polaroids, 2011, teNeues Verlag ISBN 978-3-8327-9530-6
