= Gail Elliott =

English fashion designer

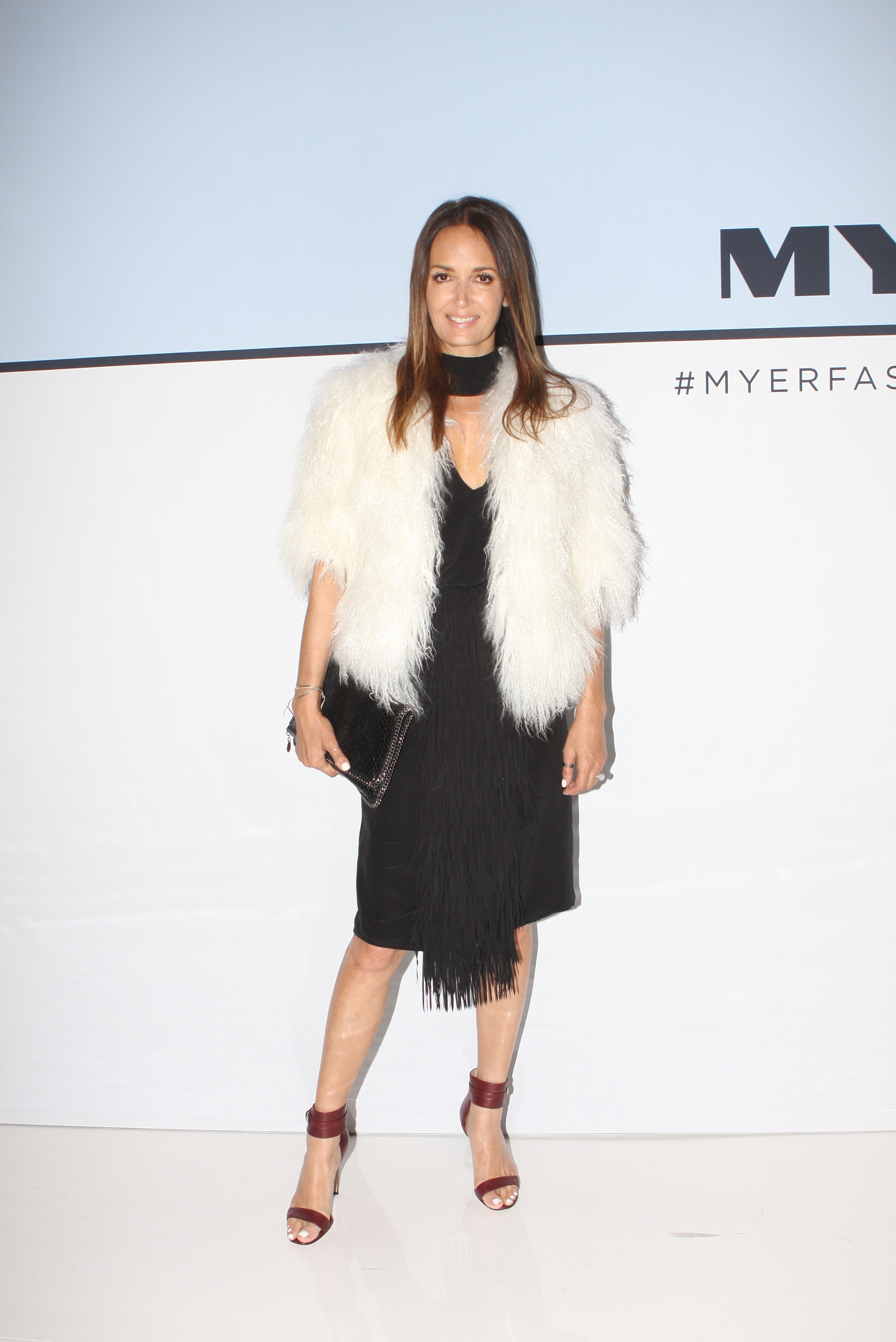
- Elliott in 2015
- Born: 15 June 1966 (age 60); Balham, London, England
- Occupations: Fashion designer; model
- Label: Little Joe Woman
- Spouse: Joe Coffey (m. 1997)
- Website: littlejoewoman.com

Gail Elliott (born 1966) is an English fashion designer and former model.

== Early life ==
Elliott was born in Balham, London, in 1966. She is of mixed Anglo-Indian, Scottish and other European ancestry.

== Career ==
=== Modeling ===
Elliott began to model when she was 17 years old, at the suggestion of her ballet teacher. She moved to Tokyo, Japan, where she worked as a model for two years, after which she moved to New York City. Over the years, Elliott modeled for some of the world's major fashion brands such as Versace, Valentino, Armani, Ralph Lauren, Karl Lagerfeld, Calvin Klein, Dolce & Gabbana, Marc Jacobs, Chanel, Tom Ford, and Donna Karan. Elliott worked with photographers such as Steven Meisel and Mario Testino. Her modeling career spanned a period of 24 years.

=== Little Joe Woman ===
Elliott ventured into fashion design, starting a clothing label with her husband Joe Coffey in 2002, which was named Little Joe Woman. The label was started in New York and was subsequently based out of Sydney, Australia. The company's headquarters was later transferred to Bali, Indonesia. Elliott's husband is the brand's CEO while Elliott is its creative director. The brand, which has been described as "a rock-chic, luxe-resort fashion line", originally offered slip dresses and camisoles.

== Personal life ==
During her first trip to Australia, Elliott was introduced to her now-husband Coffey by INXS lead singer Michael Hutchence, who at the time was the boyfriend of her model friend Helena Christensen. Elliott and Joe were married in 1997. Her wedding gown was designed by Azzedine Alaïa, while Christensen, Cindy Crawford, and Yasmin Le Bon were some of her bridesmaids.
