= René Gruau =

Italian fashion illustrator

- Born: Renato Zavagli Ricciardelli delle Caminate; 4 February 1909; Rimini, Italy
- Died: 31 March 2004 (aged 95); Rome, Italy
- Resting place: Monumental Cemetery of Rimini
- Known for: Fashion illustration
- Notable work: La Dolce Vita poster, 1959; Moulin Rouge, 1963; Women in Industry, 1980; Black Curl, 1984
- Movement: Modern fashion

Count Renato Zavagli Ricciardelli delle Caminate, professionally known as René Gruau (4 February 1909 – 31 March 2004) was a fashion illustrator whose exaggerated portrayal of fashion design through painting has had a lasting effect on the fashion industry. Because of Gruau's inherent skills and creativity, he contributed to a change in the entire fashion industry through the new pictures that represented the already popular designs created by designers in the industry. The benefits, including economic stimulation and enhancement of advertising are still present in the industry today via a new way of fashion illustration, fashion photography. Gruau became one of the best known and favorite artists of the haute couture world during the 1940s and 50s working with Femina, Marie Claire, L'Officiel, L'Album Du Figaro and an assortment of "high-style" magazines. Gruau's artwork is recognized and commended internationally in some of Paris and Italy's most prestigious art museums including the Louvre in Paris and the Blank in Italy. In addition to his international fame and recognition, "Gruau's artwork is known for its timeless and enduring style".

== Personal life ==
Born Renato Zavagli Ricciardelli delle Caminate in Rimini, Italy, on 4 February 1909, Gruau was the son of an Italian count but instead of following in his father's footsteps and accepting the job of royal military commander, his passion and inclination for arts led him to a love and pursuance of fine arts. When René's mother, Maria Gruau, a French aristocrat, and his father separated when he was three, he moved to Paris with her. Gruau then took his mother's last name, which is the name he is known by, opposed to his father's last name and noble connection. At fourteen, Gruau began to support his mother and himself by selling drawings to the Milanese fashion journal Lidel. He was inspired to pursue fashion illustration by his close relationship with his elegant mother. He demonstrated talent for drawing throughout much of his early life and worked as an illustrator for fashion magazines such as Femina, Marie Claire, and Vogue in Paris in his teens and early 20s. Gruau found it difficult to find work during World War II and ultimately found little work for small or unestablished designers such as Christian Dior before he became popular during this time. He worked as he could and contributed to the concealment of Jewish refugees.

== Career ==
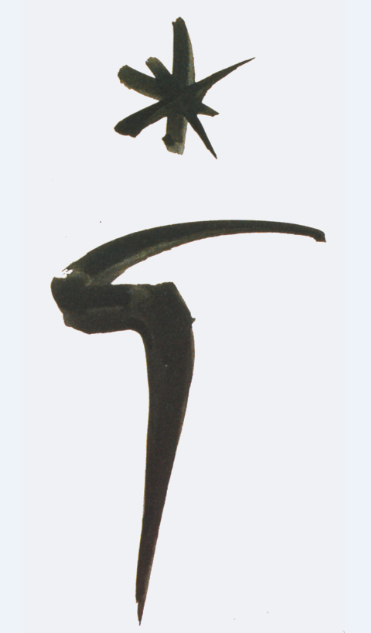
Gruau's signature

Gruau's artistic talent in fashion illustration merited him publication at the age of 14 and by the time he reached 18, he was published internationally, in the US, Italy, and France. In his lifetime, Gruau worked for numerous magazines including Marie-Claire, Femina, Elle, Vogue, Harper's Bazaar, Flair, L'Officiel, Madame Figaro, and L'Officiel de la Couture. Gruau was hired by major designers like Pierre Balmain, Christian Dior, Jacques Fath, Balenciaga, Elsa Schiaparelli, Rochas, Lanvin, Elizabeth Arden, and Hubert de Givenchy. Gruau gave life to their haute couture clothing and expanded their popularity with his captivating illustrations.

Gruau, whose posters often echoed both classical Japanese drawings and Toulouse-Lautrec's sketches of fin de siècle Paris night life, was perhaps best known for creating the marketing images for Miss Dior perfume and for Rouge Baiser lipstick. According to Alan Riding of the New York Times, "everything he did, he evoked the glamour and style of the world of high fashion". Because the technical age of the 20th century had yet to emerge, Gruau's pictures were the advertisements of the time and gave marketing and presentation of clothing a new brilliant flair.

Gruau, whose posters for Le Lido cabaret include the 1972 revue, Grand Jeu.

Gruau's first position as artistic director for advertising was in 1947 with Christian Dior. The two together formed the "New Look" of the time, partially a result of Dior's designs, and partially a result of Gruau's combined interpretation and upgrading of old-style graphic illustration. Gruau formed a friendship with Dior that contributed to their successful collaboration and further enlargement of fashion advertisement, which a primary reason he is mostly remembered for his work with Dior.

Gruau moved to the United States in 1948 to work for Vogue and Harper's Bazaar. He remained with the magazine for two years, and then went to work as sole illustrator for Flair. There were exhibitions of Gruau's work at the Paris Musée du Costume in 1989 and Musée de la Publicité in 1999. Gruau's birthplace, Rimini, holds a permanent collection in its city museum. Today Gruau's works are in the permanent collections of many art institutions, including the Louvre in Paris.

== Death ==
Gruau died on 31 March 2004. His ashes rest in the Monumental Cemetery of Rimini, where his funerary monument consists of a mosaic of a stylised woman's face on white marble floor circle, with a bronze stele emerging vertically from the marble, containing Gruau's signature and surmounted by an asterisk. The monument was designed by architect Pier Luigi Foschi and artist Vittorio d'Augusta, and resides by the cemetery's entrance, in symmetry with the funerary monument of Federico Fellini. Gruau's ashes and those of his son were inaugurated behind the monument on 31 March 2009, having previously been buried at a different location in the cemetery.

== Impact on fashion ==
During Gruau's lifelong career he collaborated with fashion houses such as Givenchy, Balenciaga, Lanvin, Schiaparelli, and Dior in the fashion area of haute couture. His advertising campaigns for Moulin Rouge and Le Lido utilised an old-world aesthetic, celebrating the traditional poster-art graphics of Toulouse-Lautrec, Bonnard and the pre-1900 Parisian artists. He continued to work in advertising designing the hugely influential cinema poster for Fellini's La Dolce Vita in 1959 and working on campaigns for names such as Dior, Air France, Martini, and Omega watches. He has been exhibited internationally at the Paris Musee du Costume and The Musee de la Publicite. The 2011 Spring/Summer Haute Couture Collection of Christian Dior by John Galliano was heavily inspired by Gruau's works.

== Influences ==
Rene Gruau's style combines an influence of Japanese woodblock prints and the simplified forms of Toulouse Lautrec with a bright and lively color palette. The combination of these elements lends his works an unmistakable feeling of joie de vivre and elegance. While fashion is often the subject of Gruau's works, it is the female form that most grabs the viewer's attention. "Gruau's women are not gamines and never pinups," Gilles de Bure wrote in "Gruau," a biography published in 1989. "They stroll along the Avenue Montaigne, the paths of the Bagatelle, the Croisette in Cannes. They float, they appear, they disappear as if they had neither body nor flesh."
