= Cassandra Grey =

American entrepreneur

Cassandra Grey is an American entrepreneur. She is the founder and artistic director of the luxury beauty retailer Violet Grey.
