= Modes & Travaux =

Women's magazine in France

- Editor: Patricia Wagner
- Categories: Women's magazine
- Frequency: Monthly
- Founder: Edouard Boucherit
- Founded: 1919; 107 years ago
- First issue: November 1919
- Company: Mondadori France
- Country: France
- Based in: Paris
- Language: French
- Website: Modes & Travaux

Modes & Travaux is a French language monthly general interest women's magazine based in Paris, France. Founded in 1919 it is one of the oldest magazines in the country.

== History and profile ==
Modes & Travaux was founded in 1919. The founder was Edouard Boucherit. The first issue appeared in November 1919. The former owner was Emap France, a subsidiary of the British media company. Emap bought the magazine together with other French titles in 1994. The company was acquired by the Italian media group Arnoldo Mondadori Editore in June 2006.

Modes & Travaux is part of Mondadori France, a subsidiary of Mondadori, and is published on a monthly basis. Patricia Wagner is the editor of the monthly, which has its headquarters in Paris. Its target audience is women aged between 30 and 50 years-old, who are mostly housewives living in rural areas. The magazine focuses on fashion and beauty, home decoration and garden design, food and flavours. In May 2010 the magazine was redesigned.

The magazine is also published in Belgium, Modes & Travaux Belgique.

== Circulation ==
Modes & Travaux was the forty-fifth best selling women's magazine worldwide in 2001, with a circulation of 559,000 copies. Next year the magazine sold 512,167 copies. During the period of 2003-2004 the magazine had a circulation of 505,563. In 2005 the circulation of the magazine was 491,000 copies. In 2011 the magazine sold 444,228 copies.
