= Angelika Kallio =

Latvian-born Finnish model

- Born: 15 September 1972 (age 54); Riga, Latvian SSR, Soviet Union (now Latvia)
- Years active: 1990–present
- Children: 1
- Modeling information
- Height: 1.77 m (5 ft 9 1/2 in)
- Hair color: Blonde
- Eye color: Blue
- Website: Angelikakallio.com (archived)

Angelika Kallio (born 15 September 1972) is a Finnish model, living and working abroad since the early 1990s.

== Background ==
Born in Riga, Latvian SSR, Soviet Union, Kallio moved to Finland with her mother as a child, attending the Finnish-Russian School in Helsinki. At the age of 15, she was signed by Paparazzi, the biggest modeling agency in Finland.

== Career ==
Kallio began her international modelling career in 1990 with an editorial shoot for British Elle. She was soon noticed by Karl Lagerfeld, who became her patron, and Kallio started an intense collaboration with the designer and the prestigious fashion house of Chanel.

Throughout the 1990s, Kallio graced the covers of various international fashion magazines, including Amica, Cosmopolitan, Elle, Glamour, L'Officiel, Marie Claire, and Vogue, in addition to numerous editorial shoots in other magazines like Esquire, Harper's Bazaar, Rolling Stone, and W. Kallio also worked with many fashion houses and designers such as Alberta Ferretti, Anna Sui, Azzedine Alaïa, Badgley Mischka, Calvin Klein, Carolina Herrera, Celine, Dolce & Gabbana, Helmut Lang, Lanvin, Michael Kors, Ralph Lauren, Sergio Rossi, Valentino, Versace, and Victoria's Secret, appearing in advertisements and fashion shows. Additionally, Kallio also appeared in advertisements for Macy's and Neiman Marcus.

As an international top model, Kallio worked all around the world, living in Paris, New York City, and Miami, and being featured in various news and entertainment programmes, including WABC-TV's Eyewitness News and Hard Copy. She also had a small cameo appearance in the 1993 romantic comedy film For Love or Money, starring Michael J. Fox and Gabrielle Anwar.

In the 2000s, Kallio worked for Nicole Miller for ten years, also having her own lingerie design business. As of 2010, Kallio models among others for J.Crew, and appeared on the cover of Finnish Elle for its 2nd anniversary issue. Kallio is represented by Ford Models in New York.

== Personal ==
Kallio lives in New York. She also has a grown son from a previous relationship. In addition to modeling, Kallio works as a real estate agent.

Kallio's autobiography Huippumallin päiväkirja (Top Model's Diary) was published by Tammi in Finland in 2005.

== Bibliography ==
Angelika Kallio: Huippumallin päiväkirja (Angelika Kallio: Top Model's Diary), ISBN 978-951-31-3376-4, Tammi, 2005.
