= Jeanne Damas =

Founder of Rouje (born 1992)

Jeanne Damas (born 12 March 1992) is a French designer, creative director, model, and founder of French fashion label Rouje.

== Early life ==
Jeanne was born in Paris into a family of restaurateurs. She grew up in the 12th arrondissement with her parents' former brasserie being located downstairs from their apartment. Fashion designer Jean-Paul Gaultier was a regular customer at the restaurant and offered her a high school internship in his Paris atelier. As a teenager, she launched her blog on Skyblog and started to document her life and style.

== Career ==
Her blog also connected her with Simon Porte Jacquemus who also had a blog as a teenager. Then, the brands such as Comptoir des Cotonniers, Redoute, and & Other Stories approached Damas. In 2015, she became a brand ambassador of Gucci. At the same time, she continues to work and collaborate with Yasmine Eslami and Nathalie Dumeix.

Her career as fashion designer and creative director started in 2016, with the birth of her own clothing and cosmetics brand Rouje which started as an online, direct-to-consumer brand. In popular culture, a Rouje dress in the style "Gabin" was worn by character Madeleine Swann (Léa Seydoux) in the James Bond film No Time to Die (2021). As a model, she has appeared on the cover of Elle France and Marie Claire Korea, as well as editorials for Glamour Spain, Marie Claire Australia, GQ Style, and Elle Russia.

The Rouje brand's first physical meeting with its consumers debuted in 2018, with a retail space at Galeries Lafayette Champs-Élysées. In 2019, Jeanne Damas opened the first Rouje physical store on the Rue Bachaumont in the 2nd arrondissement of Paris. Besides the retail space, Damas also has her own restaurant "Chez Jeanne" which located next to the Rouje store. As a daughter of brasserie owner, Damas said the restaurant space has an important place in her life as a venue to bring people together in the same way she grew up.

In 2018, Jeanne Damas co-authored a book with French journalist Lauren Bastide, titled à Paris, featuring 20 Parisian women and their stories.

== Public image ==
Vogue Paris has called her "the Paris girl personified," while W included her on their list of "the most iconic French girls of all time." Damas was chosen as one of the European "30 under 30" by Forbes in 2017.
