= Dora Kallmus =

Austrian photographer

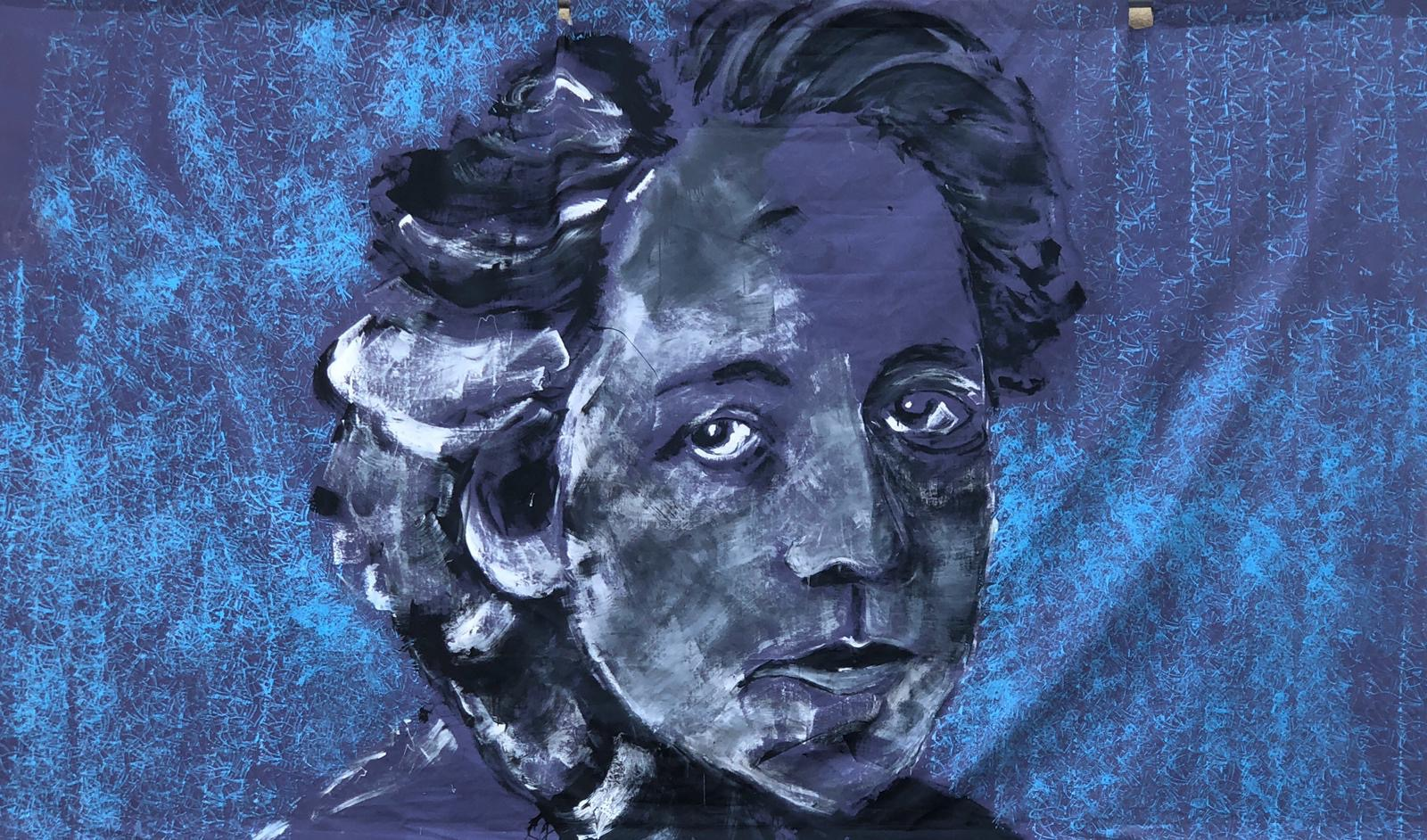
- Born: Dora Philippine Kallmus; 20 March 1881; Vienna, Austria-Hungary
- Died: 28 October 1963 (aged 82); Frohnleiten (near Steiermark), Austria
- Other names: Madame D'Ora; Madame d'Ora
- Occupation: Photographer
- Known for: Society and fashion photography

Dora Philippine Kallmus (20 March 1881 – 28 October 1963), also known as Madame D'Ora or Madame d'Ora, was an Austrian fashion and portrait photographer.

== Early life ==
Dora Philippine Kallmus was born in Vienna, Austria, in 1881 to a Jewish family. Her father was a lawyer. Her sister, Anna, was born in 1878 and deported in 1941 during the Holocaust. Although her mother, Malvine (née Sonnenberg), died when she was young, her family remained an important source of emotional and financial support throughout her career.

She and her sister, Anna, were both "well-educated," spoke English and French, and played the piano. They had also traveled throughout Europe.

She became interested in the photography field while assisting the son of the painter Hans Makart, and in 1905 she was the first woman to be admitted to theory courses at the Graphische Lehr- und Versuchsanstalt (Graphic Training Institute). That same year she became a member of the Association of Austrian photographers. At that time she was also the first woman allowed to study theory at the Graphischen Lehr- und Versuchsanstalt, which in 1908 granted women access to other courses in photography.

== Career ==
In 1907, she established her own studio with Arthur Benda in Vienna called the Atelier d’Ora or Madame D'Ora-Benda. The name was based on the pseudonym "Madame d'Ora", which she used professionally. D'ora and Benda operated a summer studio from 1921 to 1926 in Karlovy Vary, Czech Republic, and opened another gallery in Paris in 1925. The Karlsbad gallery allowed D'Ora to cater to the "international elite vacationers." These same clients later convinced her to open her Paris studio.

Between 1917 and 1927, D'Ora's studio "produced" photographs for Ludwig Zwieback & Bruder, a Viennese department store.

She was represented by Schostal Photo Agency (Agentur Schostal) and it was her intervention that saved the agency's owner after his arrest by the Nazis, enabling him to flee to Paris from Vienna.

Her subjects included Josephine Baker, Coco Chanel, Tamara de Lempicka, Alban Berg, Maurice Chevalier, Colette, and other dancers, actors, painters, and writers.

== Personal life ==
In 1919, D’Ora converted from Judaism to Roman Catholicism. She died on 28 October 1963. Four years prior, she had sustained injuries after being hit by a motorcycle in Paris, resulting in her returning to Vienna. D'ora lived her final years and passed in the same house that had been forcibly sold under the Nazis before being returned to her family.

== Exhibits ==
- 2012/13: Vienna's Shooting Girls – Jüdische Fotografinnen aus Wien, Jewish Museum Vienna, Austria
- 2018: Madame d’Ora. Machen Sie mich schön!, Leopold Museum, Vienna, Austria
- 2019/20: Der große Bruch: d'Oras Spätwerk, GrazMuseum, Graz, Austria
- 2020: Madame d’Ora, Neue Galerie, New York City; exhibition catalog 9783791359700

== Sources ==
- The History of European Photography 1900–1938, FOTOFO., 2011. ISBN 978-80-85739-55-8
