= Guy Aroch =

Israeli photographer

- גיא ארוך
- Born: Israel
- Citizenship: Israeli-American
- Education: New York School of Visual Arts
- Occupation: Photographer
- Children: leyla Blue

Guy Aroch (Hebrew: גיא ארוך) is an Israeli American New York–based fashion and celebrity photographer who emigrated from Israel in 1988. He lives and works in New York City and Los Angeles.

Aroch moved to New York to become a professional photographer. He graduated from the New York School of Visual Arts in 1993. As a professional photographer, he specialized in beauty, fashion, and celebrity portraits.

His photography has been seen on covers and features of newspapers and international magazines, such as Vogue UK, Men's Vogue, Italian Glamour, Italian GQ, French, Block, Violet Grey, WWD Beauty, Interview, Nylon, and Wonderland. His advertising clients include Diesel, Victoria's Secret, Gant Rugger, Dorchester Hotels, 7 For All Mankind, Aldo, Jean Louis David, Wella, Bloomingdale's, Regis, Kenneth Cole, L'Oréal, Garnier, Sonia Rykiel, and H&M. His photography also features the cover of British indie rock band the Arctic Monkeys's third album, Humbug.
