= Elina Kechicheva =

Bulgarian photographer

Elina Kechicheva is a Bulgarian photographer based in Paris.

== Career ==
Her career was started by the participation in prestigious Festival international de mode et de photographie of Hyères followed by publication in the book of the Parisian art director Patrick Remy "Paradise".

As a fashion photographer, she has worked for publications such as Vogue Numéro and many others.

Elina Kechicheva collaborated with Dior on their SS 2021 campaign, for which received the awards for the best “Image de Luxe”and “Photo pour la luxe” from ACDA annual competition in June 2021.

She created portrait photographs of personalities such as The Weeknd, Michael Cimino, Amy Winehouse, Pharrell Williams Marisa Berenson, Cat Power, Kate Bosworth, Eva Green, Evan Rachel Wood and Diane Kruger amongst others.

Elina Kechicheva's artistic work has been exhibited in Paris, Berlin, New York and Sofia. In 2014 she wrote and directed short movie with the participation of Zoé le Ber, Solene Hebert and Priscilla de la Forcade named "3 Soeurs" which debuted in Nowness and was later selected for The Berlin Fashion Film Festival.

On 24 June 2021, the National Gallery of Bulgaria presented Kechicheva’s latest single artist exposition “Lethe” to positive critics reviews.
