= Lonneke Engel =

Dutch fashion model and entrepreneur

- Born: 14 June 1981 (age 44); Eindhoven, Netherlands
- Occupation: Model
- Years active: 1993–2012
- Spouse: Dirk Verest
- Modelling information
- Height: 174 cm (5 ft 9 in)
- Hair colour: Dark Brown
- Eye colour: Blue
- Website: http://www.lonneke.com

Lonneke Engel (born 14 June 1981) is a Dutch fashion model and entrepreneur. Engel is most known for her modeling work with the brand Ralph Lauren. She is the founder of lifestyle site Organice Your Life.

== Personal life ==
Engel was born in Eindhoven, Netherlands. Her younger sister, Marloes Engel, is also a model. Engel is fluent in both Dutch and English. In November 2013, Engel married Dirk Verest in their New York City loft.

== Career ==
Engel began modeling at the age of 12, and after meeting Bruce Weber, landed campaigns for Guess?, Versace Jeans, and Abercrombie & Fitch. She is most known for her exclusive campaigns with Ralph Lauren and Covergirl cosmetics, the former being a brand she has worked with for over a decade.

Over the span of her modeling career, she starred in advertisements for Roberto Cavalli, Chanel Allure, Kate Spade Twirl, Bebe, Brunello Cucinelli, Alberto Guardiani, and London jeweller David Morris. In addition to multiple magazine editorials, she also did catalog work for J. Crew and Neiman Marcus. Engel has appeared on multiple magazine covers, including Elle, Vogue, Harper's Bazaar, Avant Garde, and Marie Claire. But her infamously noted appearance was on cover for the March 1999 issue of Seventeen (American edition) and in January 2011, she appeared on the cover of Sports Illustrated South Africa.

She appeared in Tiësto's music video "Love Comes Again" in 2004. She also appeared in a commercial for BMW I model vehicles in 2012.

In 2008 Engel founded Organice Your Life, a lifestyle site promoting organic and sustainable living. She received certification as a Health Coach from Institute of Integrative Nutrition in New York in 2009.

In 2012, after two decades of modeling, Engel retired as an active model to concentrate on her new lifestyle site. As of 2014, Engel is also the American agent for shoe designer Mano Macchiato. She is working on a children's book featuring her adopted shelter dog, Vito.

Engel is a staunch conservative, and backed Donald Trump during the 2016 US presidential election. She has taken the same position during the 2020 presidential campaign.
