= Yasmeen Ghauri =

Canadian fashion model (born 1971)

- Born: March 23, 1971 (age 55); Montreal, Quebec, Canada
- Occupation: Model
- Years active: 1988–1997
- Spouse: Ralph Bernstein
- Children: 2
- Modeling information
- Height: 1.78 m (5 ft 10 in)
- Hair color: Brown
- Eye color: Brown

Yasmeen Ghauri (/ˈjæzmin ˈɡɔːri/ YAZ-meen GOR-ee) is a Canadian former supermodel. She is known for her walk, described as the "walk of life" by Tyra Banks. Ghauri is one of the first women of South Asian descent to appear on the cover of Vogue.

== Early life ==
Ghauri was born in Montreal, Quebec, Canada, to a German mother and a Pakistani father who was born in Hyderabad, India, but moved to Pakistan at a young age. According to Ghauri, her paternal family ultimately has origins in Ghor, Afghanistan, and she identifies as "half South and Central Asian."

== Career ==
At the age of 17, Ghauri was discovered by Edward Zaccaria, artistic director of Platine Coiffure, after walking out of a hair salon in Montreal. Despite her parents' disapproval, Ghauri actively pursued a modelling career, debuting in Milan and Paris before moving to New York City in 1990. There, she was noticed by fashion critics and labels alike. The New York Times described her runway walk as a "ball-bearing swivel of her hips". Ghauri's appearance prompted part of what is now termed in fashion the "Canadian invasion".

Ghauri enjoyed fame in the early 1990s after her first major cover with Elle in January 1991. Ghauri did her own makeup because there weren't enough shades for her skin tone. She starred alongside Chris Isaak in Elton John's music video for the song "Sacrifice". Soon after, she became the face of both Chanel and Jil Sander. By the end of 1990, Ghauri appeared on the cover of French Elle in July and December. In September, Ghauri graced the catwalk for Gianni Versace's show in Milan and, by the next month, was walking for Chanel, Helmut Lang, Jean Paul Gaultier and Lanvin in Paris. She became the face of Christian Dior and Anne Klein in 1991. In January 1991, she was photographed by Steven Meisel for the cover of Italian Vogue, becoming one of the first women of South Asian descent to appear on the cover of Vogue. Toward the end of the year, Ghauri appeared in British and Italian Vogue editorials. Photographer Patrick Demarchelier, who photographed her for the Italian issue, called her his favourite subject.

In 1992, Ghauri became the face of Valentino couture and Versace. According to an NYMag.com online model profile, Ghauri walked the controversial Gianni Versace "Bondage" show in Milan in February 1992. The same year, she signed with Victoria's Secret, becoming one of the angels. She became the face of Hermès and Lanvin in 1993, and was photographed by Gilles Bensimon for Elle. Ghauri appeared in the 1995 documentary Unzipped by Isaac Mizrahi. Ghauri became a frequent face in Victoria's Secret catalogues and the iconic swimsuit issues, which served to further heighten her success. In 1996, she began to walk in the annual Victoria's Secret Fashion Show. Ghauri retired in 1997, confirming speculations that arose after she stepped out of the Yves Saint Laurent show at the last minute.

== Personal life ==
Ghauri is married to lawyer Ralph Bernstein, with whom she has a daughter and a son. The family lives in the town of Bedford, New York.

== References in other media ==
Ghauri was the inspiration for the character Jasmine in the comic book series Jonathan Steele.
