= List of fashion magazines =

A fashion magazine is a publication that focuses on the topic of fashion. They can be in printed form, found online or both and can be aimed at different audiences which includes fashion houses, fashion buyers, amateur or professional designers and the general public. Fashion magazines can be either trade or consumer magazines or both.

Notable fashion magazines include:

== 0–9 ==
- 032c, est. 2001; Berlin, Germany
- 10 Magazine, est. 2001; London, United Kingdom

== A ==
- Ackermann's Repository, 1809–1829; London, United Kingdom
- Acne Paper, 2005–2014, 2021–present; Stockholm, Sweden
- Allure, 1991–2022 (now online only); New York City, United States
- An An, est. 1970; Tokyo, Japan
- AneCan, est. 2007; Tokyo, Japan
- Amica, est. 1962; Milan, Italy
- Annabelle, est. 1938; Zurich, Switzerland
- Another Magazine, est. 2001; London, United Kingdom
- Another Man, est 2005; London, United Kingdom
- Arena, 1986–2009; London, United Kingdom
- Arena Homme +, est. 1994; London, United Kingdom
- Asian Woman, est. 2000; London, United Kingdom

== B ==
- Basic, est. 2016; Los Angeles, United States
- La Belle Assemblée, 1806–1837; London, United Kingdom
- Blitz, 1980–1991; London, United Kingdom
- Burda Style, est. 1950; Offenburg, Germany

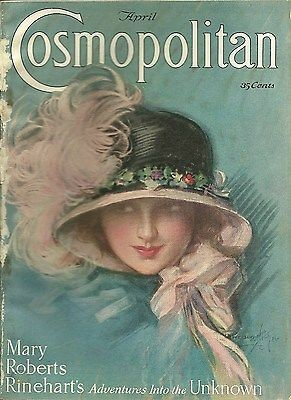
Cover of Cosmopolitan, April 1924

== C ==
- Cabinet des Modes, 1785–1793; Paris, France
- Café, est. 1990; Stockholm, Sweden
- CanCam, est. 1981; Tokyo, Japan
- Cawaii!, 1996–2009; Tokyo, Japan
- Cittá Bella, est. 1984, Taiwan
- Classy, est. 1984; Tokyo, Japan
- Cliché, est. 2009; United States
- Complex, est. 2002; New York City, United States
- Cosmode, est. 2002; Tokyo, Japan
- Cosmopolitan, est. 1886; New York City, United States
- Cosmopolitan Brasil, 1973–2018; São Paulo, Brazil
- Cosmopolitan Srbija i Crna Gora, 2004–?; Belgrade, Serbia
- Cosmopolitan Russia, 1994–2022; Moscow, Russia
- Crash, est. 1998; Paris, France

== D ==
- D la Repubblica, est. 1996; Rome, Italy
- Darling, 2009–2012; Los Angeles, United States
- Dazed, est. 1992 (as Dazed & Confused until 2014); London, United Kingdom
- De Gracieuse, 1862–1936; Leiden, the Netherlands
- Der Bazar, 1854–1933; Berlin, Germany
- Derby Harper's Bazaar (rebranded to Harper's Bazaar Italia), 1966–1968; Milan, Italy
- Details, 1982–2015; New York City, United States

== E ==
- Egg, est. 1995; Tokyo, Japan
- Men's Egg, 1999–2013; Tokyo, Japan
- Elegante Welt, 1912–1969 (rebranded to Madame und Elegante Welte); Berlin, Germany
- Elle, est. 1945; Paris, France
- Elle Men
- Elle Girl, 2001–2006; New York City, United States
- Elle Australia, 1990–2002, 2013–2020, 2024–present; Sydney, Australia
- Elle Brasil, 1988–2018, 2020–present; São Paulo, Brazil
- Elle Canada, est. 2001; Montreal, Canada
- Elle India, est. 1996; Mumbai, India
- Elle Kazakhstan, est. 2015; Almaty, Kazakhstan
- Elle Portugal, 1988–2021; Lisbon, Portugal
- Elle Québec, est. 1989; Montreal, Canada
- Ettelaat-e Banuvan, 1957–1979; Tehran, Iran
- Eva, 1933–1968; Milan, Italy
- Evie, est. 2019; New York City, United States

== F ==
- The Face, 1980–2004, 2019–2026; London, United Kingdom
- Fantastic Man, est. 2005; Amsterdam, the Netherlands
- Fashion, 1980–2003 (rebranded to L'Officiel China); Beijing, China
- Fashion, est. 1977; Toronto, Canada
- Fashion Forward, est. 2009; Tel Aviv, Israel
- Fashion Quarterly, 1980–2020, 2020–present; Auckland, New Zealand
- Femeia, est. 1878; Bucharest, Romania
- Femina, 1901–1964; Paris, France
- Femina, 1982–2010; Cape Town, South Africa
- Femina, est. 1952; Copenhagen, Denmark
- Femina, est. 1972; Jakarta, Indonesia
- Femina, est. 1959; Mumbai, India
- Femmes du Maroc, est. 1995; Casablanca, Morocco
- Figaro, 1950–1952 (rebranded to Madame); Munich, Germany
- Flare, 1979–2016 (online only until 2023, absorbed by Fashion); Toronto, Canada
- Le Follet, 1829–1892; Paris, France
- Frankie, est. 2004; Sydney, Australia
- Fruits, 1997–2017; Tokyo, Japan
- Fucsia, est. 2008; Medellín, Colombia
- Fujin Gahō, est. 1905; Tokyo, Japan

== G ==
- Gallery of Fashion, 1794–1803; London, United Kingdom
- Giornale delle Dame e delle Mode di Francia, 1786–1794; Milan, Italy
- Glamour, 1939–2019 (now online only); New York City, United States
- Glow, 2002–2017; Toronto, Canada
- Godey's Lady's Book, 1830–1896; Philadelphia, United States
- Gothic & Lolita Bible, 2001-2017; Tokyo, Japan
- GQ, est. 1957; New York City, United States
- GQ Australia, est. 1998; Sydney, Australia
- GQ India, est. 2008; Mumbai, India
- GQ Russia, 2001–2022; Moscow, Russia
- GQ Thailand, est. 2014; Bangkok, Thailand
- Grazia, est. 1936; Milan, Italy
- Grazia India, est. 2008; Mumbai, India

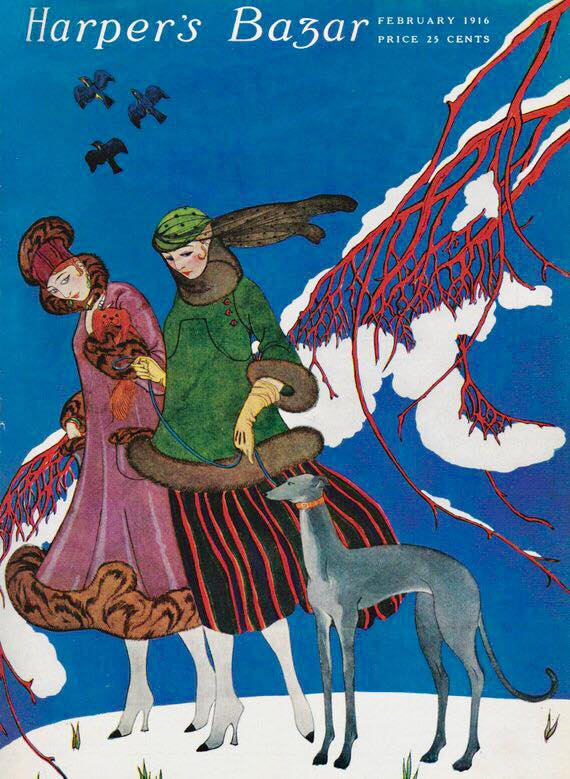
Cover of Harper's Bazaar, February 1916

== H ==
- Happie Nuts, est. 2004; Tokyo, Japan
- Harper's Bazaar, est. 1867; New York City, United States
- Harper's Bazaar Arabia, est. 2007; Dubai, United Arab Emirates (for 'Arabia')
- Harper's Bazaar Argentina, 2011–2019; Buenos Aires, Argentina
- Harper's Bazaar Australia/New Zealand, 1984–1990, 1998–2020, 2021–present (as Harper's Bazaar Australia until 2020); Sydney, Australia
- Harper's Bazaar Brasil, est. 2011; São Paulo, Brazil
- Harper's Bazaar Chile, 2015–2019; Santiago, Chile
- Harper's Bazaar España, est. 2010; Madrid, Spain
- Harper's Bazaar France, 1983–1991, 2023–present; Paris, France
- Harper's Bazaar Germany, 1963–1970, 1985–1992, 2013–present; Berlin, Germany
- Harper's Bazaar India, est. 2009; Mumbai, India
- Harper's Bazaar Indonesia, est. 2000; Jakarta, Indonesia
- Harper's Bazaar Italia, 1969–1997, 2022–present; Milan, Italy
- Harper's Bazaar Japan, 2000–2010, 2013–present; Tokyo, Japan
- Harper's Bazaar Nederland, 1986–1990, 2014–present; Amsterdam, the Netherlands
- Harper's Bazaar Polska, 2013–2019; Warsaw, Poland
- Harper's Bazaar Russia, 1996–2022; Moscow, Russia
- Harper's Bazaar Srbija, est. 2014; Belgrade, Serbia
- Harper's Bazaar Ukraine, est. 2008; Kyiv, Ukraine
- Harper's Bazaar UK, est. 1929; London, United Kingdom
- Hero, est. 2009; London, United Kingdom

== I ==
- i-D, est. 1980; London, United Kingdom
- InStyle, 1994–2022 (now online only); New York City, United States
- InStyle UK, 2001–2016; London, United Kingdom
- IO Donna, est. 1996; Milan, Italy

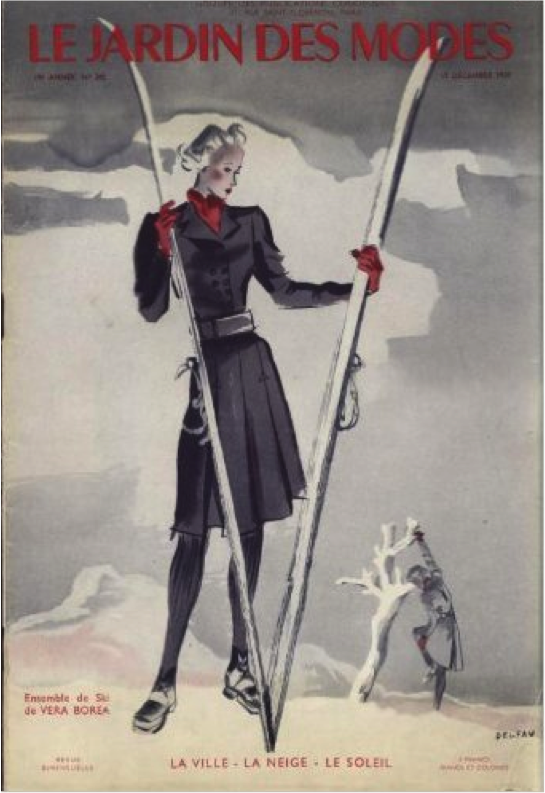
Cover of Le Jardin des Modes, December

== J ==
- Jalouse, 1997–2020 (online only until 2021); Paris, France
- Le Jardin des Modes, 1922–1971, 1977–1997; Paris, France
- JJ, est. 1975; Tokyo, Japan
- Journal des dames et des modes, 1797–1839; Paris, France
- Journal des Luxus und der Moden, 1786–1827; Weimar, Germany

== K ==
- Koakuma Ageha, est. 2005; Tokyo, Japan
- Krestyanka, 1922–2015 (now online only); Moscow, Russia

== L ==
- L'Officiel, est. 1921 (as L'Officiel de la couture et de la mode until 2020); Paris, France
- L'Officiel China, 1987–1990, 2002–2002, 2003–present; Beijing, China
- L'Officiel España, 1992–1992, 2015–2018; Madrid, Spain
- L'Officiel Italia, 1991–1992, 2012–present; Milan, Italy
- L'Officiel Japan, 2005–2008, 2015–2017, 2024–present (as L'Officiel Japon until 2008); Tokyo, Japan
- L'Officiel Philippines, 2015–2017, 2021–present (as L'Officiel Manila until 2017); Manila, the Philippines
- L'Officiel Riviera, est. 2021; Nice, France
- L'Officiel Russia, 1997–2011, 2013–2018, 2019–2022; Moscow, Russia
- L'Officiel Ukraine, est. 2001; Kyiv, Ukraine
- L'Officiel USA, 1976–1980, 2018–present; New York City, United States
- L'Officiel Hommes, 1977–1991, 1996–1997 (rebranded to L'Optimum), 2005–present; Paris, France
- Love, 2009–2020, 2025–present; Paris, France
- Look, 2007–2018; London, United Kingdom
- Lucire, est. 1997; Wellington, New Zealand
- Lucky, 2000–2015; New York City, United States
- Lula, est. 2005; London, United Kingdom

== M ==
- Madame, est. 1952; Munich, Germany
- Magazine of Female Fashions of London & Paris, 1798–1806 (rebranded to Record of Fashion and Court Elegance); London, United Kingdom
- Marie Claire, est. 1937; Paris, France
- Mehâsin, 1908–1909; Constantinople, Turkey
- Milk, est. 2003; Paris, France
- La Mode Ilustrée, 1860–1937; Paris, France
- La Mode Pratique, 1891–1951; Paris, France

== N ==
- Nicola, est. 1997; Tokyo, Japan
- Nissaa Min Al Maghrib, est. 1995; Casablanca, Morocco
- No Tofu, est. 2007; United States
- Non-no, est. 1971; Tokyo, Japan
- Men's Non-no, est. 1986; Tokyo, Japan
- Novità, 1950–1964 (rebranded to Vogue Italia & Novità); Milan, Italy
- Numéro, est. 1998; Paris, France
- Nüyou, est. 1976; Singapore, Singapore
- Nuts, est. 2023; New York City, United States
- Nylon, est. 1999 (online only from 2017 to 2023); New York City, United States
- Nylon Guys, 2005–2015; New York City, United States

== O ==
- Olivia, est. 2007; Helsinki, Finland
- Oyster, 1994–2019 (online only until 2021 closure); Sydney, Australia

== P ==
- Paper, est. 1984; New York City, United States
- Pavement, 1993–2006; Auckland, New Zealand
- Pinky, est. 2004; Tokyo, Japan
- Pop, est. 2000; London, United Kingdom
- PopSister, est. 2010; Tokyo, Japan
- Popteen, est. 1980; Tokyo, Japan
- Prestige, 1993–2019 (now online only); Babbda, Lebanon
- Prestige, est. 2005; Hong Kong, Hong Kong
- Purple Fashion, est. 2004; Paris, France

== Q ==
- The Queen, 1864–1961 (rebranded as Queen); London, United Kingdom
- Queen, 1962–1970 (rebranded as Harper's & Queen); London, United Kingdom

== R ==
- Ranzuki, est. 2000; Tokyo, Japan
- Ray Li, est. 1995; Beijing, China
- Record of Fashion and Court Elegance, 1806–1809; London, United Kingdom
- Ruili Fashion Pioneer, 1999–2016 (as Ruili Cute Pioneer until 2004); Beijing, China

== S ==
- Schön!, est. 2009; London, United Kingdom
- Seventeen, 1944–2018 (now online only); New York City, United States
- Seventeen, est. 1967; Tokyo, Japan
- Sleazenation, 1996–2003; London, United Kingdom
- Sneaker Freaker, est. 2002; Melbourne, Australia
- Soen, est. 1936; Tokyo, Japan
- Stylist, est. 2009; London, United Kingdom

== T ==
- Telva, est. 1963; Madrid, Spain

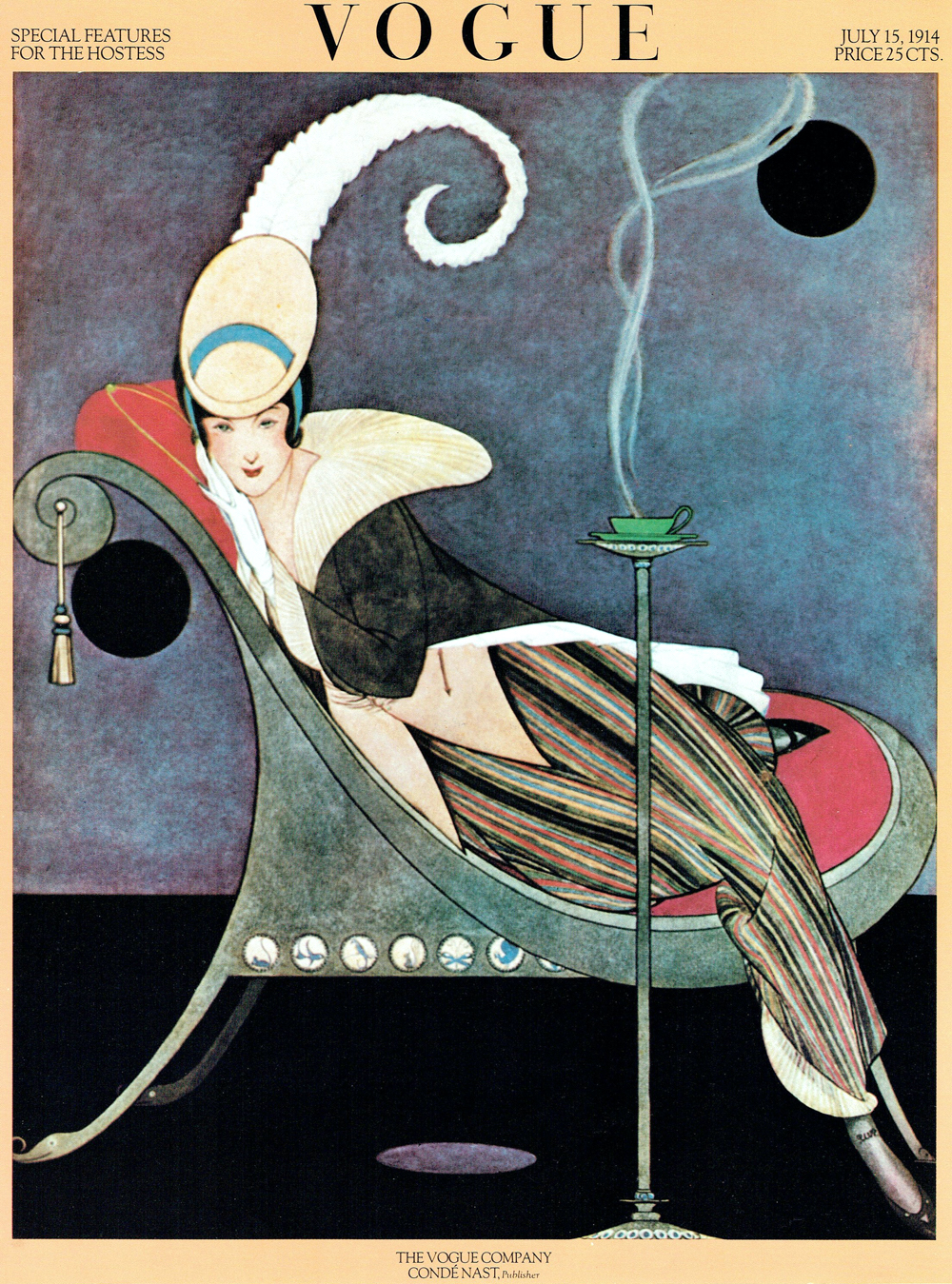
Cover of Vogue, July 1914

== V ==
- V, est. 1999; New York City, United States
- VMan, est. 2003; New York City, United States
- Verve, 1995–2020 (now online only); Mumbai, India
- Vestoj, est. 2009; Paris, France
- ViVi, est. 1983; Tokyo, Japan
- Vogue, est. 1892; New York City, United States
- Vogue Knitting, 1932–1969, 1982–present; New York City, United States
- L'Uomo Vogue, 1967–2017, 2018–2021; Milan, Italy
- Men's Vogue, 2005–2008; New York City, United States
- Men in Vogue, 1965–1970; London, United Kingdom
- Teen Vogue, 2002–2017 (now online only); New York City, United States
- British Vogue, est. 1916; London, United Kingdom
- Vogue Adria, est. 2024; Belgrade, Serbia (for 'Adria')
- Vogue Arabia, est. 2017; Dubai, United Arab Emirates (for 'Arabia')
- Vogue Australia, est. 1959; Sydney, Australia
- Vogue Brasil, est. 1975; São Paulo, Brazil
- Vogue China, est. 2005; Beijing, China
- Vogue Czechoslovakia, est. 2018; Prague, Czech Republic
- Vogue Deutsch, 1928–1929, 1979–present; Berlin, Germany
- Vogue España, 1981–1983, 1988–present; Madrid, Spain
- Vogue France, est. 1920 (as Vogue Paris until 2021); Paris, France
- Vogue Greece, 2000–2012, 2019–present (as Vogue Hellas until 2012); Athens, Greece
- Vogue Hong Kong, est. 2019; Hong Kong, Hong Kong
- Vogue India, est. 2007; Mumbai, India
- Vogue Italia, est. 1964; Milan, Italy
- Vogue Japan, est. 1999 (as Vogue Nippon until 2011); Tokyo, Japan
- Vogue Korea, est. 1996; Seoul, South Korea
- Vogue Latinoamérica, est. 1999; Miami, United States (for 'Latin America')
- Vogue México, 1980–1995, 1999–present; CDMX, Mexico
- Vogue Nederland, 2012–2021, 2022–present; Amsterdam, the Netherlands
- Vogue New Zealand, 1957–1968; Auckland, New Zealand
- Vogue Philippines, est. 2022; Manila, the Philippines
- Vogue Polska, est. 2018; Warsaw, Poland
- Vogue Russia, 1998–2022; Moscow, Russia
- Vogue Scandinavia, est. 2021; Stockholm, Sweden (for 'Scandinavia')
- Vogue Singapore, 1994–1997, 2018–present; Singapore, Singapore
- Vogue South Africa, 1958–1966; South Africa
- Vogue Taiwan, est. 1996; Taipei, Taiwan
- Vogue Thailand, est. 2013; Bangkok, Thailand
- Vogue Türkiye, est. 2010; Istanbul, Turkey
- Vogue Ukraine, est. 2013; Kyiv, Ukraine

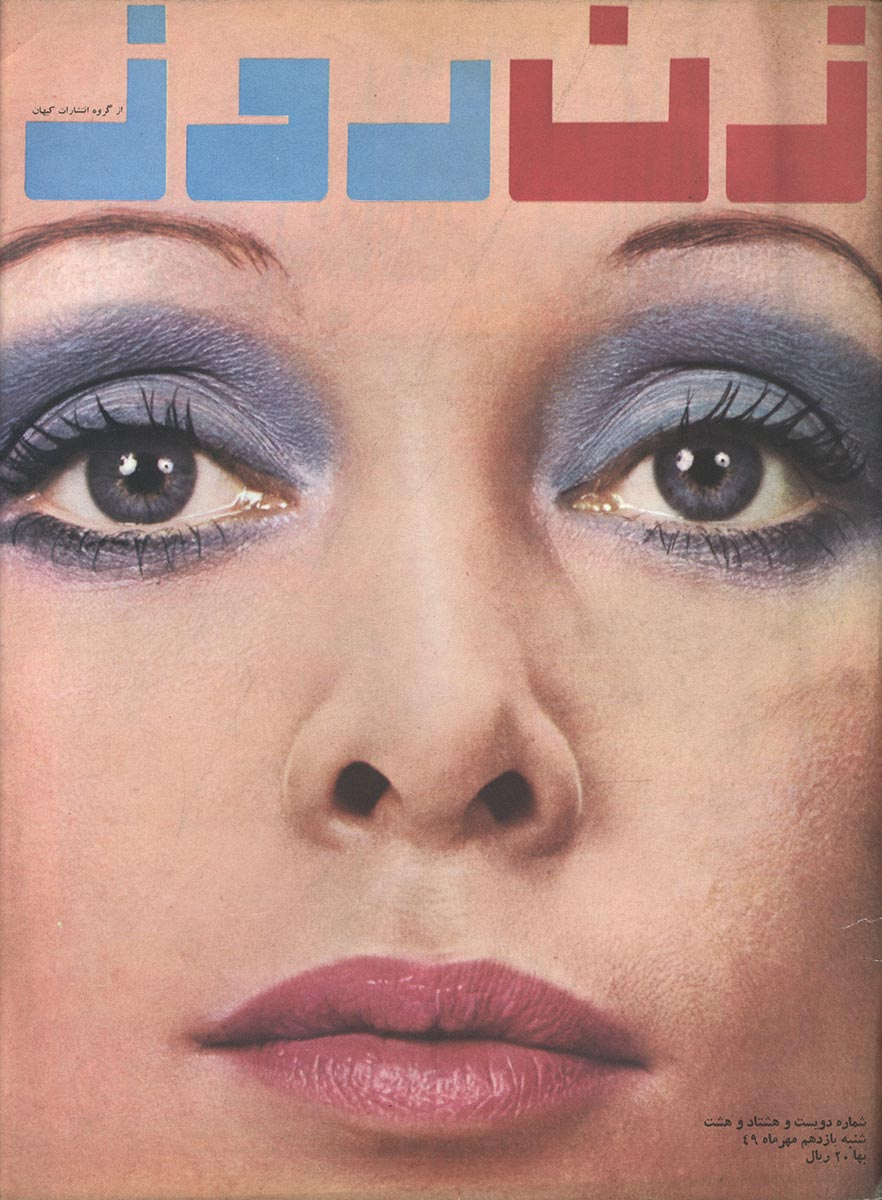
Cover of Zan-e Rooz, 3 October 1970

== W ==
- W, est. 1972; New York City, United States
- W China, est. 2023; Beijing, China
- W Korea, est. 2005; Seoul, South Korea
- Wonderland, est. 2005; London, United Kingdom

== X ==
- Xmag, est. 2019; Madrid, Spain

== Z ==
- Zan-e Rooz, est. 1965; Tehran, Iran

== See also ==
- Fashion journalism
