= Asics Gel-1130 =

Line of shoes by Asics

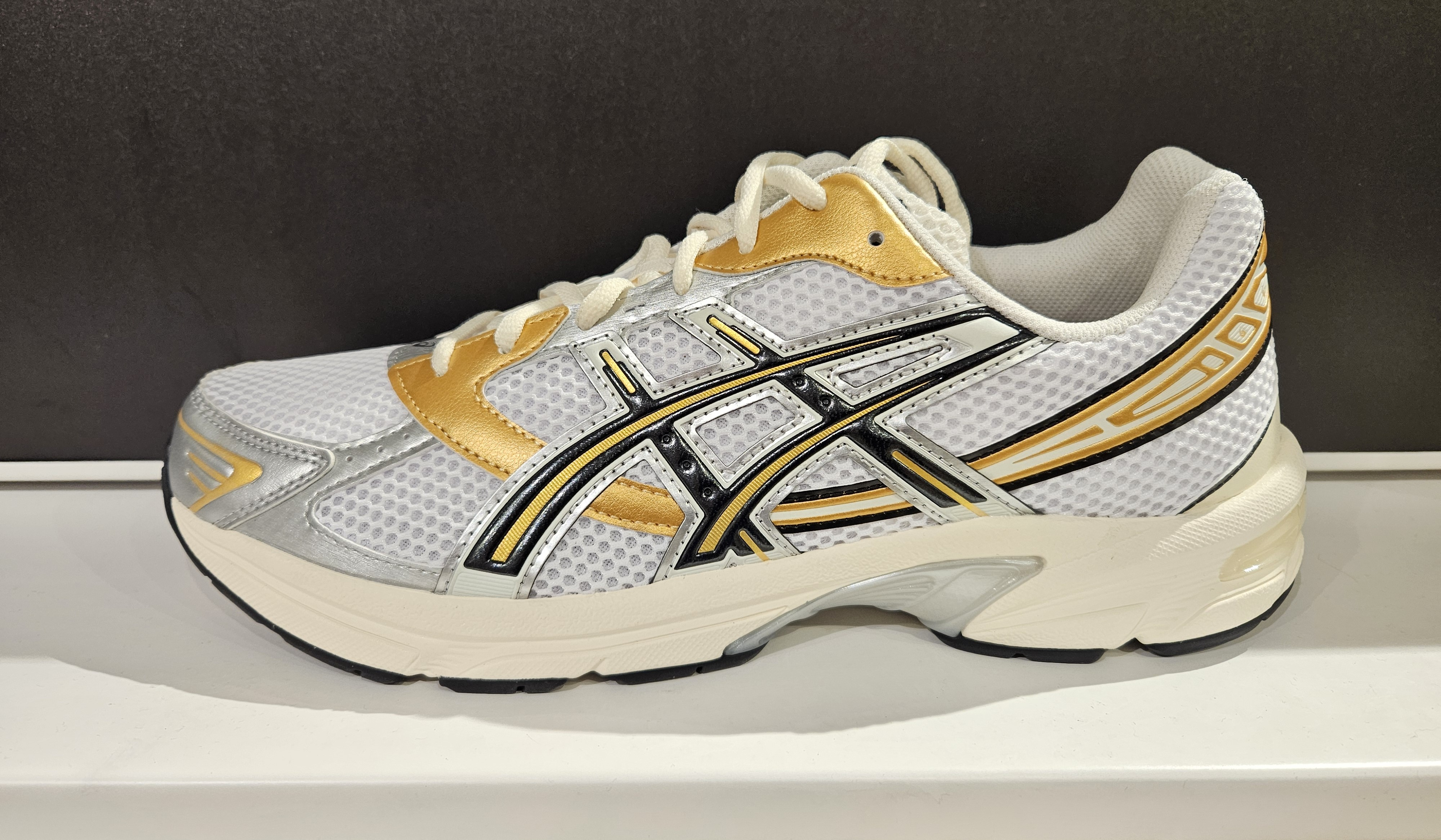
- Type: Sneakers
- Inventor: Asics
- Inception: 2008; 18 years ago
- Available: Yes

Asics Gel-1130 is a running shoe released by Asics. The shoe is the ninth release of the Gel-1000 series, a line of entry level shoes sold at an affordable price. The final shoe in the series, Gel-1170, was released in 2011 before the line was replaced by the GT-1000 series in 2012.

== Overview ==
The Gel-1130 was released in 2008 as an entry level shoe for the company's stability running shoes. It was meant to be a cheaper option to the Gel-Kayano 14 and GT-2130 which were more expensive and offered more premium features.

The design for the shoe took inspiration from the Gel-Kayano 14. The upper features mesh and synthetic leather to allow breathability and a more comfortable feeling while the bottom features the company's GEL technology and TRUSSTIC system. The GEL offers comfort while the TRUSSTIC offers stability. Because of the cheaper price, the shoe does not feature as much GEL as more expensive models.

The shoe was brought back in 2021 following the success of the Gel-Kayano 14. The company decided to team up with Kiko Kostadinov again for another collaboration release in July 2021 which was then followed by a general release the next month.
