= Sneaker Freaker =

Australian fashion magazine

- Editor: Simon "Woody" Wood
- Categories: Sneakers
- Frequency: Bi-annual
- Publisher: Sneaker Freaker
- First issue: June 2002
- Company: Sneaker Freaker
- Country: Australia/International
- Language: English/Spanish
- Website: sneakerfreaker.com

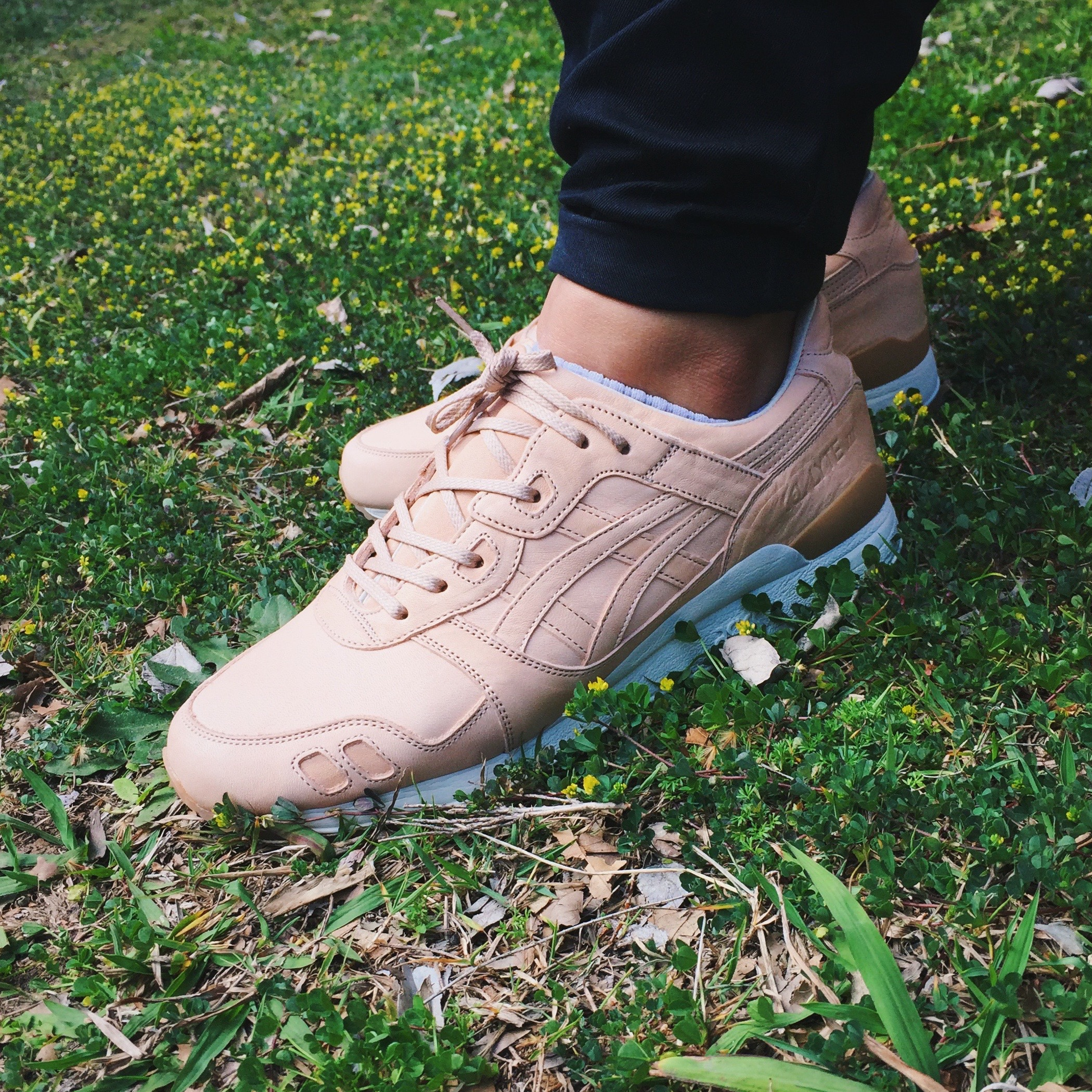
ASICS GEL-Lyte III 'Made in Japan'

Sneaker Freaker is an independent magazine and website that covers sneakers, streetwear, and sneaker culture, and a publishing brand of the same name. Started in Melbourne, the magazine reaches a global audience through print and online channels.

== History ==
Sneaker Freaker was launched in October 2002, as the first and only international sneaker-dedicated publication in the world. Originally conceived as a means for its founder and editor Simon "Woody" Wood to get free shoes, the magazine has expanded into an online space with global coverage spanning sneaker releases, industry movements, historical features, exclusive interviews, multi-city sneaker-shopping guides, and a dedicated content section for performance-focused footwear. The company has published 49 issues of its self-titled magazine and three hardcover coffee table books.

Sneaker Freaker has partnered with numerous international brands to deliver events and footwear activations globally. They have released over 20 collaboratively designed sneakers with top sportswear companies including Lacoste, adidas, Saucony, PUMA, New Balance, Le Coq Sportif, Diadora and ASICS, the most recent being 2022’s Sneaker Freaker x atmos x ASICS GEL-Lyte III 'Alley Cats'. Other product partnerships include special-edition wristwatches with G-SHOCK (2015, 2018), a Nike x Medicom BE@RBRICK (2007), aerosol paint-cans with Montana Cans (2014), and a luggage collection with sustainable backpack/bag label pinqponq (2017).

In 2024, Sneaker Freaker launched the Taking Control of Their Narrative event series as an in-person evolution of the magazine’s editorial work celebrating women in the footwear industry. Events have been held at Finesse in Melbourne, Australia and Wish ATL in Atlanta, USA.

Sneaker Freaker magazine is sold in more than 40 countries.

== Publishing ==
The current issue of Sneaker Freaker magazine is #49, published in 2023.

In late 2018, Sneaker Freaker published The Ultimate Sneaker Book with Taschen. The 700 page book serves as an anthology of Sneaker Freaker magazine’s original journalism covering the historical and contemporary stories, collaborations, key releases, and notable events that have shaped the sneaker industry. It received an update with the 45th edition in 2024.

In October 2021, Sneaker Freaker published the 720-page book Soled Out: The Golden Age of Sneaker Advertising with Phaidon Press. The book focused on print advertisements, assembling nearly 900 vintage ads primarily sourced from across the 1980s and 1990s featuring sporting and cultural icons such as Andre Agassi, Paula Abdul, Bo Jackson, Michael Jordan, MC Hammer, and Shaquille O’Neal.

In November 2023, Sneaker Freaker published World’s Greatest Sneaker Collectors with Taschen. Its 752 pages feature photography of and interviews with sneaker collectors in Tokyo, New York, London, Philadelphia, Melbourne, Stjørdal and more. It includes informative ‘How To’ guides covering sneaker photography, storage, insurance, cleaning, and identifying/avoiding counterfeit sneakers.

Sneaker Freaker have also published books with Nike, Globe, adidas, New Balance, Reebok, G-SHOCK, PONY, and PUMA.

== Product collaborations ==
Year	Collaboration
2006	Sneaker Freaker x Lacoste Missouri 85 "Minty Fresh"
2007	Sneaker Freaker x Nike x Medicom "Bearbrick"
2008	Sneaker Freaker x PUMA Blaze of Glory "Great White" and "Black Beast"
2008	Sneaker Freaker x PUMA Blaze of Glory "Sharkskin"
2009	Sneaker Freaker x AIAIAI Earbuds
2009	Sneaker Freaker x New Balance 850 "Skippy"
2010	Sneaker Freaker x PUMA R698 "Geography Teacher"
2010	Sneaker Freaker x ASICS GEL-Lyte III "Alvin Purple"
2012	Sneaker Freaker x PUMA Dallas "Bunyip"
2012	Sneaker Freaker x Supra Skytop III "Goldenballs" and "Blueballs"
2012	Sneaker Freaker x Saucony Grid 9000 "Bushwhacker"
2013	Sneaker Freaker x adidas Torsion Integral
2013	Sneaker Freaker x New Balance 998 "Tassie Devil"
2013	Sneaker Freaker x Le Coq Sportif Flash "Summer Bay"
2013	Sneaker Freaker x PUMA Blaze of Glory "Sharkbait"
2014	Sneaker Freaker x ASICS GEL-Kayano "Melvin, Son of Alvin"
2014	Sneaker Freaker x Montana Spray Can
2015	Sneaker Freaker x PUMA Blaze of Glory "Bloodbath"
2015	Sneaker Freaker x Saucony Grid "Kushwacker"
2015	Sneaker Freaker x G-SHOCK DW-6900SF-1D "NIGHTOWL"
2015	Sneaker Freaker x Lacoste Missouri "Smart Casual"
2016	Sneaker Freaker x New Balance 997.5 "Tassie Tiger"
2016	Sneaker Freaker x Diadora V7000 "Taipan"
2017	Sneaker Freaker x pinqponq
2018	Sneaker Freaker x New Balance 574 "Tassie Devil"
2018	Sneaker Freaker x G-SHOCK DW-5700 "Redback"
2019	Sneaker Freaker x ASICS GEL-Lyte III 'Tiger Snake'
2019	Sneaker Freaker x ASICS GEL-Lyte III 'Neurotoxic'
2022	Sneaker Freaker x atmos x ASICS GEL-Lyte III 'Alley Cats'

== See also ==
- Benjamin Kapelushnik
- Sneaker collecting
