= Door problem =

Analogy in video game development

In video game development, the door problem is an analogy about game design that summarizes the contrast between the perceived simplicity of implementing a trivial feature and the actual difficult nature of the task that becomes more apparent in a development process. The term was coined in 2014 by Liz England, a game designer, while she was working for Insomniac Games.

The door problem originally models the difficulty of game development, but its core principle can be applied to many disciplines and areas of work.

== Premise ==
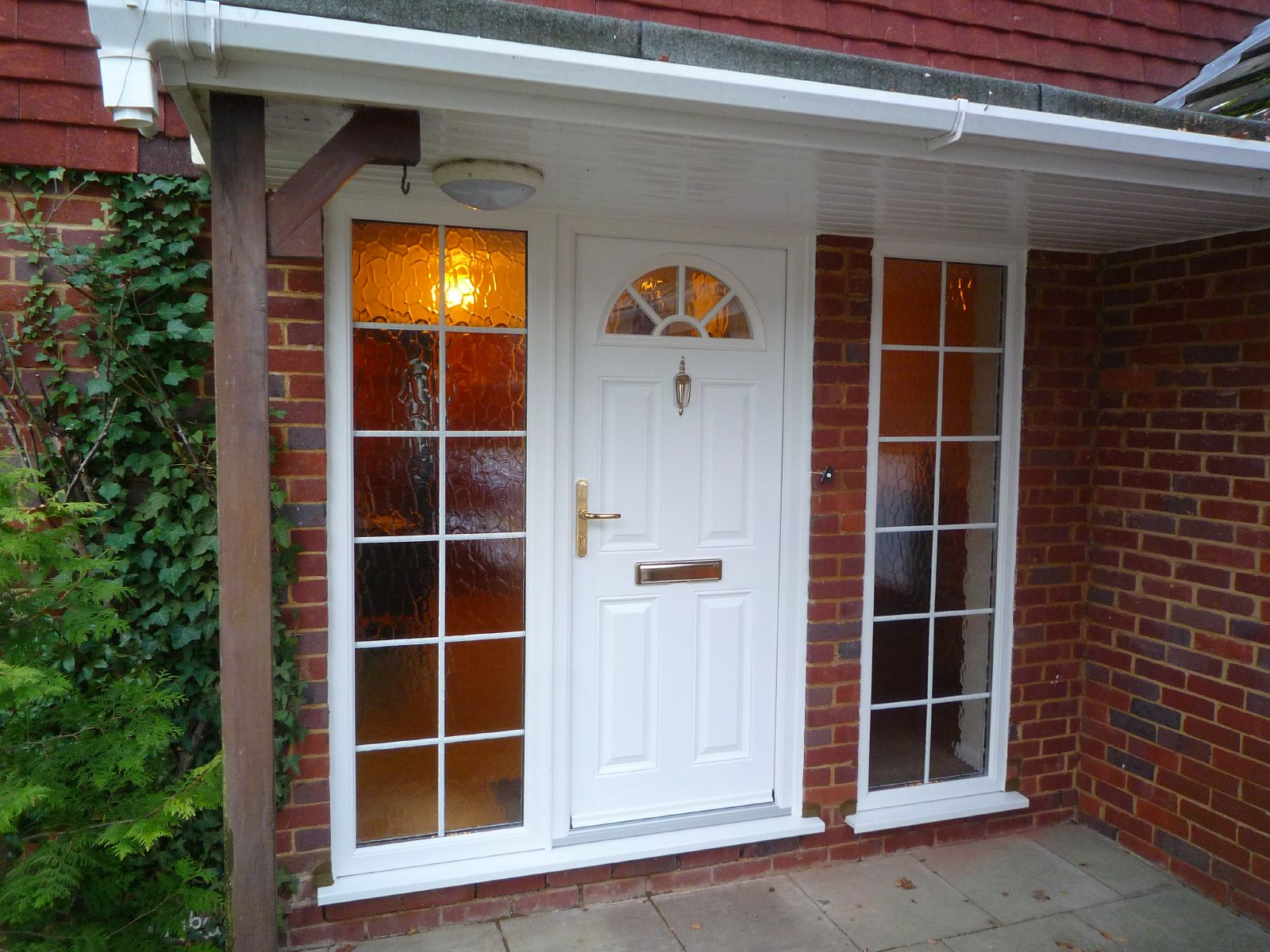
A door is an example of a complex feature that is seemingly trivial to implement correctly.

In the original description of the analogy, Liz England justifies and explains the job requirements of a designer and how complex the job actually is compared to how the requirements are initially posed (making a door). She uses the idea of implementing a door into a video game as an analogy. While the task of putting a door in a video game may sound initially simple, the problem is revealed to be multifaceted, with many different issues to consider. Various questions about how the doors will be specifically implemented are posed. The questions range from mundane to logically complex, such as if there are any doors in the game at all up to how to handle culling and unloading areas behind a closed door. Liz England asserts that "[someone] has to solve The Door Problem, and that someone is a designer".

She adds onto her original explanation, adding how people with different job roles may approach implementing a door. During the process of game development, many people are involved, and each has their own specialties. For example, England lists how an audio engineer may consider the acoustics of the door opening and closing, while a quality assurance tester may think of the different ways that they can test or break the function of the door. England points out that a task may appear mundane but can have varying practical considerations depending on who specifically is working on it.

== Real-life examples ==
Kurt Margenau
(@kurtmargenau)
tweeted:

Replying to @talecrafter

Don’t know what everyone’s up in arms about. We added doors in combat to TLOU2, took like a day. Just gotta have good talent I gues... LOL JK IT WAS THE THING THAT TOOK THE LONGEST TO GET RIGHT WHAT WERE WE THINKING 1/100

March 9, 2021

Many who have worked on game development before have expressed their frustration and experience with implementing doors, elevators, or other basic but complex gameplay elements or mechanics.

After the development of The Last of Us Part II, co-game director Kurt Margenau tweeted that adding doors to the game took the longest out of any other feature, adding that "[t]his stuff took a long time, and hopefully was worth it." He further elaborates, explaining how the navigation mesh changes and how different physical conditions affect the door (sprinting, walking, etc.). Neil Uchitel, an audio director also working for Naughty Dog added how he worked with the development team to "[make] it sound great in every case."

In an interview with The Verge, Pete Galbraith, a developer at Owlchemy Labs, noted how there is a relatively high level of accuracy needed when animating the opening of a door in order for the player to believe the physics behind it.

Bill Gardner, a lead-level designer for BioShock Infinite, related the problem to elevators instead of doors. When recalling the process of adding elevators to the game, he explained the various initial problems their developers ran into when implementing an elevator: handling the items beneath the elevator's car, moving the passengers around, or when the elevator's doors close.

Marcin Pieprzowski, a QA for The Witcher 3: Wild Hunt, noted that during testing a door that would unlock after a boss was defeated, 12 different scenarios were discovered that would cause the door to not unlock when it was supposed to. Stephan Hövelbrinks noted that many Assassin's Creed games solve the problem by omitting doors entirely.
