= Rio Fashion Week =

Fashion week in Rio de Janeiro, Brazil

Rio Fashion Week (RFW) is a fashion week biannually held in Rio de Janeiro, Brazil, organized by FFW.
