= Radical Chic (comics) =

Radical Chic is a Brazilian comic book character created by cartoonist Miguel Paiva in 1984 for Domingo magazine, a Sunday supplement of Jornal do Brasil.

The comic follows the titular character, Radical Chic, a woman in her thirties concerned with reality and also with her own happiness. Her name was inspired by the expression coined by the American journalist Tom Wolfe to refer to people who, in the 1960s and 1970s, were divided between worldly life and social commitment.

The character's comic strips were published by several newspapers and magazines (including a special insert in the women's magazine Nova) for about four decades and were also compiled in several books, including the O Livro de Pensamentos da Radical Chic, published in 2001 by Record, in which the character is the "author" of several ironic phrases on subjects such as diet, love, men and Rio de Janeiro.

In 1993, the character participated in a "pictorial" for Playboy magazine, in which she was drawn nude in a similar way to the publication's traditional photo essays. In the same year she became the protagonist of a TV show of the same name on Globo, in which she was played by actress Andréa Beltrão. Among other projects, she also had a game, worked in marketing campaigns and was the protagonist of a booklet by the Ministry of Health for a campaign against AIDS.

Although it is still republished regularly, Miguel Paiva "retired" the character and does not create new stories with her, stating that nowadays it no longer makes sense for a character like her to be written by a man. In his book Memória do Traço, released in 2019 and in which he talks about his career and his creations, the cartoonist states that Radical Chic today "lives in a place in Mauá, where she spends her life smoking marijuana and having sex".

In 2020, the character was honored by the Troféu HQ Mix when she was chosen as the model for the trophy for its 32nd edition. The trophy changes every year, always representing a different important character for Brazilian comics.
