= Maria Eugênia Villarta =

Brazilian plastic artist and former model

- Born: January 25, 1958 (age 68); Taubaté, São Paulo, Brazil
- Occupations: Plastic artist, businesswoman and former fashion model
- Spouse: Jomar Cardoso (m. 1976)
- Children: 5

Maria Eugênia Simi Villarta Cardoso, better known as Maria Eugênia Villarta (Note: She is artistically known only as Maria Eugênia (fashion) or Villarta (visual arts).) (born January 25, 1958), is a Brazilian businesswoman, plastic artist and former fashion model. She was the model who has made the most magazine covers in Brazil to date, has had her face on approximately 300 of them, in addition to being exclusive to the brand Marcelo Beauty and L'Oréal for many years.

An award-winning visual artist, in addition to two honorable mentions, she also received first and second place medals (two silver and one bronze). Her works are part of the artistic collections of the Legislative Assembly of the State of São Paulo, the Municipal Chamber of Santarém, Portugal, and the City Hall of Vinhedo, State of São Paulo.

== Career ==
=== Fashion ===
Maria Eugênia began her career in 1977, at the age of 18, when she decided on her own initiative to go to an agency to try her hand at modeling. After some photos, a book and some contacts, she was soon called by Editora Abril for her first job, the January 1978 cover of Claudia.

Although she was not tall – 1.63 meters tall – her unusual beauty, along with a harmonious face from any angle, combined with great photogenicity, immediately opened the doors to the world of fashion, making her grace covers and editorials for several magazines, including Nova, Manequim and Vogue, as well as important work as an exclusive model for Marcelo Beauty and for L'Oréal. Called by Hans Donner, she participated in the opening of the eight o'clock soap opera on TV Globo Champagne, which was shown between October 24, 1983, and May 4, 1984, which brought her great national prominence. Her career as a model also took her abroad, having lived for months in New York City, United States.

Regarded as the model who has made the most magazine covers in Brazil to date, she has had her face printed on approximately 300 magazines. 250 of these photos were exhibited by Taubaté Shopping in 1994, in the exhibition As mil e uma faces de Maria Eugênia (The Maria Eugênia's One Thousand and One Faces) — among the photos, those of the opening of the soap opera Champagne, from TV Globo, various posters, catalogues, advertisements in magazines, editorials and even billboards of makeup campaigns.

In 1980, she made a small appearance in the soap opera Água Viva, by Gilberto Braga, playing the character Cristina.

=== Visual arts ===
In 1992, after fifteen years of career, Maria Eugênia decided leave the fashion and open a painting studio in São Paulo, becoming a recognized plastic artist.

Graduated in 1978 by the Pan-American School of Art and Design in São Paulo and in 1990 by the Armando Álvares Penteado Foundation, between 1992 and 2002 she exhibited in several national art exhibition halls, in cities such as São Paulo, Rio de Janeiro and São Bernardo do Campo. In 2004, the artist was invited and exhibited in Santarém, Portugal.

Her works are part of the artistic collections of the Legislative Assembly of São Paulo, the Municipal Chamber of Santarém, Portugal, and the City Hall of Vinhedo, State of São Paulo.

== Personal life ==
In 2004, recognized as a Taubatean personality for her artistic contribution to local and Brazilian culture, she was awarded the city's highest honor: the Jacques Félix Commendation. On September 26, 2022, the businesswoman received the title of Cidadã Paulistana from the Municipal Chamber of São Paulo for her services provided to the city.

The businesswoman is married to the engineer Jomar Cardoso since 1976, with whom she moved permanently to São Paulo in 1978 and has five children.
