= Asics Gel-Kayano 14 =

Line of shoes by Asics

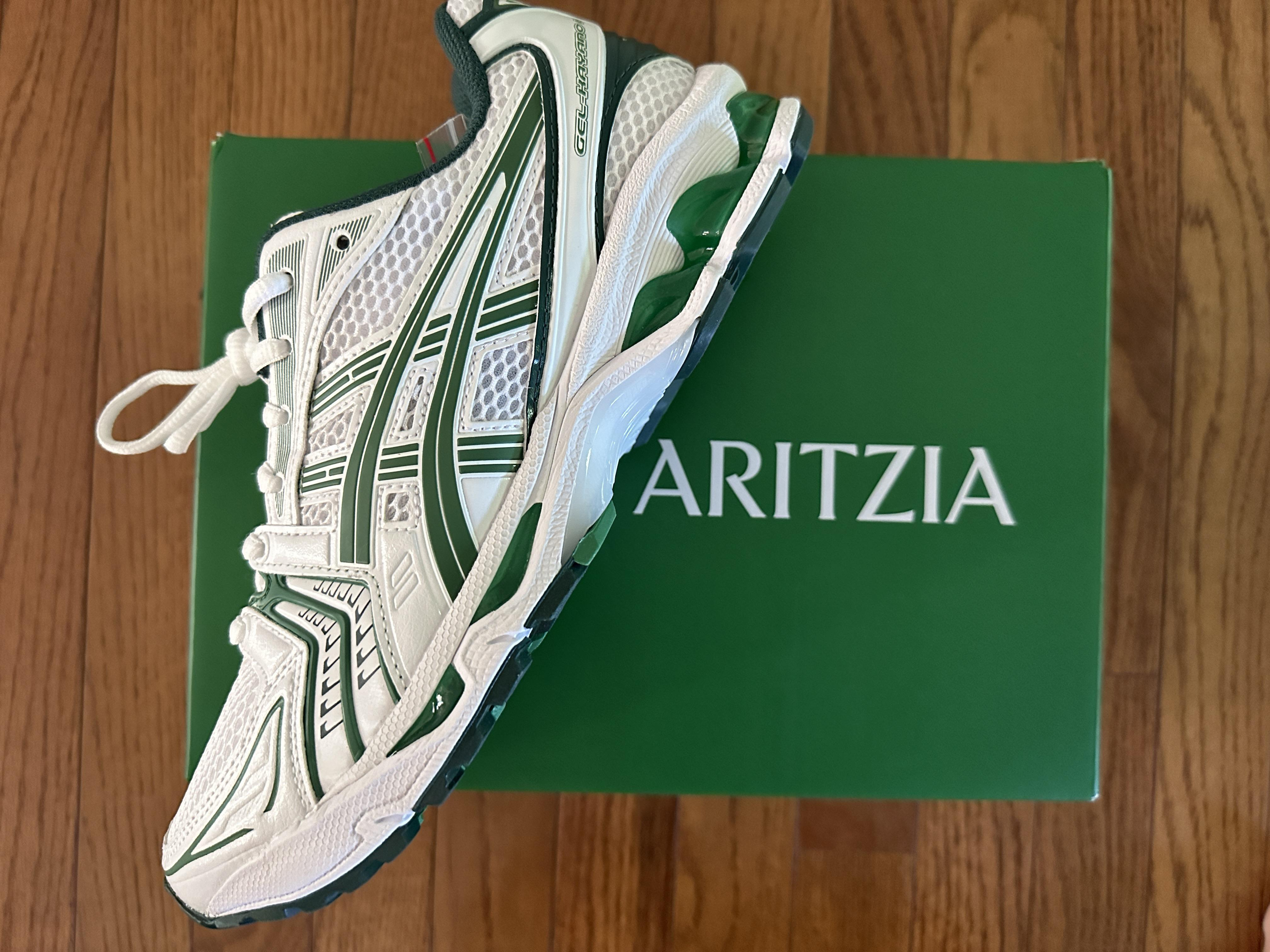
- Type: Sneakers
- Inventor: Asics
- Inception: 2008; 18 years ago
- Manufacturer: Asics
- Available: Yes
- Website: asics.com

Asics Gel-Kayano 14 is a running shoe released by Asics in 2008. Popularity of the shoe was boosted thanks in part to the Y2K fashion revival in the early 2020s and has seen a second life as a lifestyle shoe.

== Overview ==
The shoe is part of the Gel-Kayano running line which gets its name from its creator, Toshikazu Kayano. Toshikazu Kayano has been the one responsible for designing every model up until the 14th release which was the first designed by someone else, Hidenori Yamashita. The design of the shoe was based on the concept of "flash" with the colors, lines, materials, and silhouette reflecting that.

== Popularity ==
Asics saw the rise of running shoes from the 2000s start to make a comeback in fashion and wanted to take a shoe from its lineup to relaunch. At first, the company was going to go with the Gel-Kayano 13 but ultimately it was Kiko Kostadinov who decided to bring back the "Gel-Kayano 14" as its design made it look faster. The shoe was relaunched in December 2020.

The shoe saw prominent success with many consumers buying the shoe for its versatile design as well as comfort. What would really cement the shoe as an icon in the fashion world was its collaboration with Montreal based studio, JJJJound. The collaboration was released on Aug 26, 2022 and sold out. The popularity of the release led to other models and versions becoming unavailable and difficult to obtain.
