= Cosmopolitan (magazine) =

American fashion and culture magazine

- Cover of the Fall 2025 issue, Margaret Qualley by Alana O'Herlihy
- Editor-in-Chief: Willa Bennett
- Categories: Fashion, Women's
- Frequency: Quarterly
- Total circulation: 526,322 (2025)
- First issue: March 1886; 140 years ago
- Company: Hearst Communications
- Country: United States
- Based in: Hearst Tower, New York City
- Website: www.cosmopolitan.com
- ISSN: 0010-9541

Cosmopolitan (stylized in all caps) is an American quarterly women's fashion and entertainment magazine first published in New York City in March 1886 as a family magazine; it was later transformed into a literary magazine and, since 1965, has become a women's magazine. Cosmopolitan is one of the best-selling magazines.

Formerly titled The Cosmopolitan and often referred to as Cosmo, Cosmopolitan has adapted its style and content. Its current incarnation was originally marketed as a woman's fashion magazine with articles on home, family, and cooking. For some time it focused more on new fiction and written work, which included short stories, novels, and articles. Now it is more targeted towards women's fashion, sports, and modern interests. Eventually, editor-in-chief Helen Gurley Brown changed its attention to more of a women's empowerment magazine. Nowadays, its content includes articles discussing relationships, sex, health, careers, self-improvement, celebrities, fashion, horoscopes, and beauty.

Cosmopolitan is published by New York City–based Hearst Communications. The magazine's office is in the Hearst Tower, 300 West 57th Street near Columbus Circle in Manhattan in New York City. Cosmopolitan operates nineteen twenty editions in Bulgaria, Czechia, France, Germany, Hong Kong, India, Indonesia, Italy, Korea, Malaysia, Mexico, the Middle East, the Netherlands, the Philippines, Slovenia, Spain, South Africa, Taiwan, Ukraine, and the United Kingdom.

International editions previously existed for Argentina, Armenia, Australia, Azerbaijan, Bolivia, Brazil, Central America, Chile, China, Colombia, Croatia, Cyprus, Ecuador, Estonia, Finland, Georgia, Greece, Hungary, Israel, Japan, Kazakhstan, Kenya, Latvia, Lithuania, Malaysia, Mongolia, Norway, Paraguay, Peru, Poland, Portugal, Romania, Russia, Serbia, Singapore, Sri Lanka, Sweden, Thailand, Turkey, Uruguay, Venezuela, and Vietnam.

== History ==
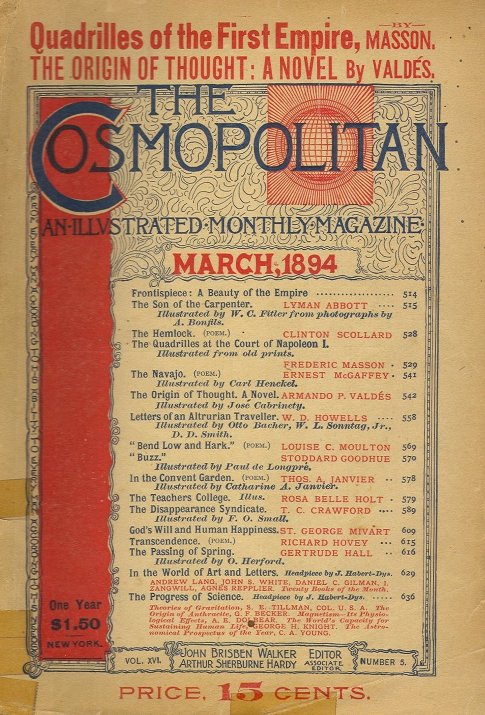
March 1894 issue of The Cosmopolitan

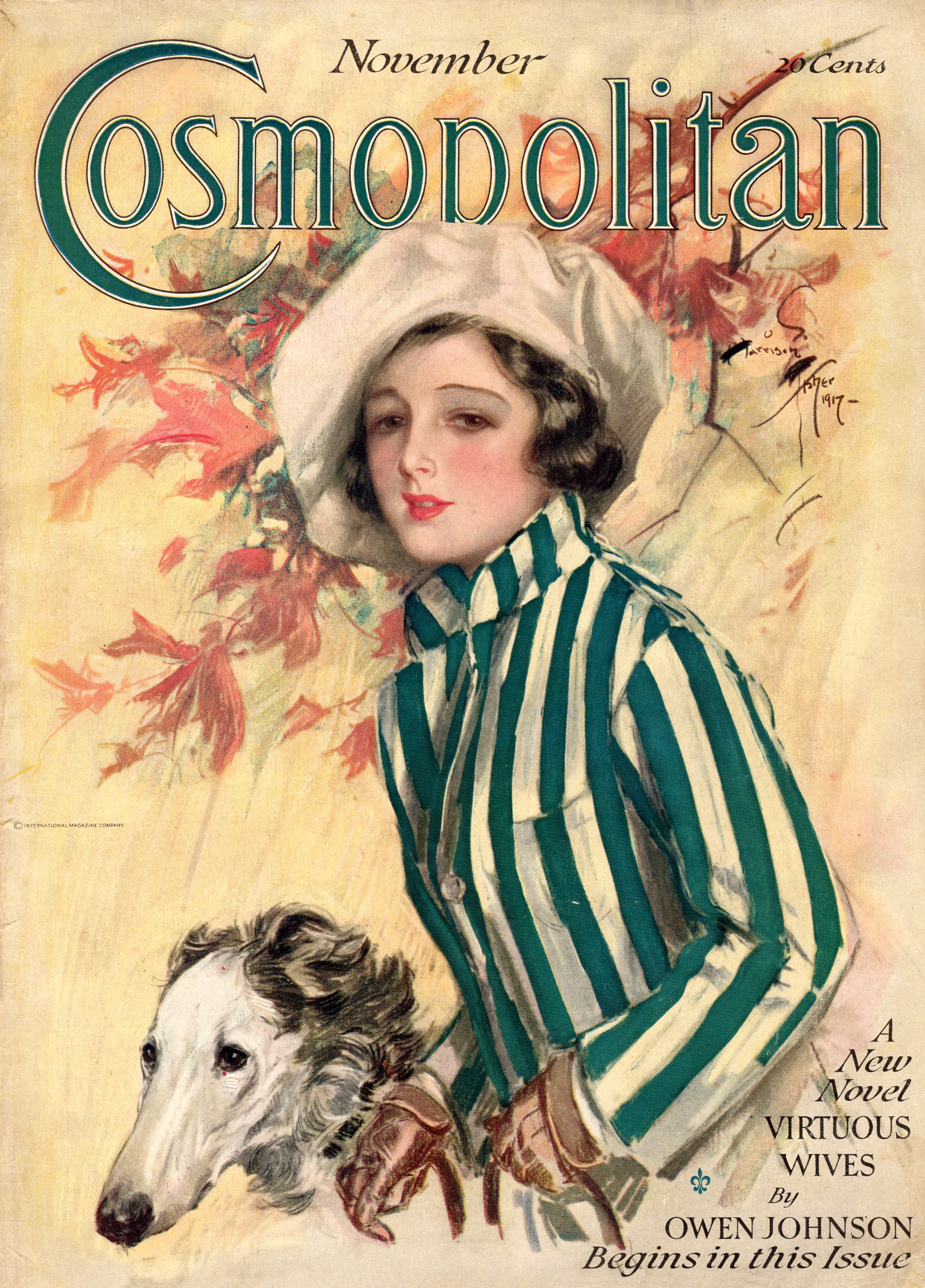
November 1917 issue of Cosmopolitan, cover by Harrison Fisher

Cosmopolitan began as a family and women's magazine, first published in New York City in March 1886 by Schlicht & Field of New York as The Cosmopolitan.

Paul Schlicht ("an opportunistic businessman motivated by the dotcom-like magazine mania of the Gilded Age") told his first-issue readers inside of the front cover that his publication was a "first-class family magazine". Adding on, "There will be a department devoted exclusively to the concerns of women, with articles on fashions, on household decoration, on cooking, and the care and management of children. There was also a department for the younger members of the family."

The Cosmopolitan's circulation reached 25,000 that year, but by November 1888, Schlicht & Field were no longer in business. In 1889, ownership was acquired by John Brisben Walker, a visionary and eccentric entrepreneur. That same year, he dispatched Elizabeth Bisland on a race around the world against Nellie Bly to draw attention to the magazine. The race between Bisland and Bly was covered by newspapers across the United States. Bly won, but the race achieved the object of giving a boost to circulation of The Cosmopolitan.

Under John Brisben Walker's ownership, E. D. Walker, formerly with Harper's Monthly, took over as the new editor, introducing color illustrations, serials, and book reviews. It became a leading market for fiction, featuring such authors as Annie Besant, Ambrose Bierce, Willa Cather, Theodore Dreiser, Rudyard Kipling, Jack London, Edith Wharton, and H. G. Wells. The magazine's press run climbed to 100,000 by 1892 and to 300,000 by 1897.

In 1894, Walker and his family moved to Irvington, New York, a village on the shores of the Hudson River that then had many of the wealthiest people in the country as residents. He promptly commissioned the construction of a new headquarters for his now thriving magazine, the Cosmopolitan Building. To this day, the three-story stone Neo-Classical revival building, designed by McKim, Mead & White, remains the largest building in Irvington.

In 1897, Walker (ever "an avid geek and prophetic thinker") came up with a plan for a free correspondence college called Cosmopolitan University, with no charges for students. Cosmopolitan would cover all expenses, requiring only a commitment to a set number of study hours. When 20,000 immediately signed up, Walker could not fund the school, and students were then asked to contribute 20 dollars a year, but the project still failed to survive long-term. Also in 1897, H. G. Wells' The War of the Worlds was serialized, as was his The First Men in the Moon (1900). Olive Schreiner contributed a lengthy two-part article about the Boer War in the September and October issues of 1900.

During his tenure as owner of The Cosmopolitan, Walker wrote many articles, essays, and even fiction stories for the magazine, reflecting his diverse and varied personal interests, which ranged from contemporary economic and political issues to aviation and automobiles. In 1904, he published them as a book. Many of his articles promoted a progressive, reformist social agenda. He wrote several articles on the then-President Theodore Roosevelt; the two men corresponded and met several times.

=== Acquisition by Hearst ===
In 1905, William Randolph Hearst purchased the magazine from John Brisben Walker for a sum variously reported as $400,000 and $1,000,000 and brought in journalist Charles Edward Russell, who contributed a series of investigative articles, including "The Growth of Caste in America" (March 1907), "At the Throat of the Republic" (December 1907–March 1908) and "What Are You Going to Do About It?" (July 1910–January 1911).

Other contributors during this period included O. Henry, A. J. Cronin, Alfred Henry Lewis, Bruno Lessing, Sinclair Lewis, O. O. McIntyre, David Graham Phillips, George Bernard Shaw, Upton Sinclair, and Ida Tarbell. Jack London's novella, "The Red One", was published in the October 1918 issue (two years after London's death), and a constant presence from 1910 to 1918 was Arthur B. Reeve, with 82 stories featuring Craig Kennedy, the "scientific detective". Magazine illustrators included Francis Attwood, Dean Cornwell, Harrison Fisher, and James Montgomery Flagg.

Hearst formed Cosmopolitan Productions (also known as Cosmopolitan Pictures), a film company based in New York City from 1918 to 1923, then Hollywood until 1938. The vision for this film company was to make films from stories published in the magazine.

=== Hearst's International ===
Cosmopolitan magazine was officially titled Hearst's International Combined with Cosmopolitan from 1925 until 1952 but was simply referred to as Cosmopolitan. In 1911, Hearst had bought a middling monthly magazine called World To-Day and renamed it Hearst's Magazine in April 1912. In June 1914, it was shortened to Hearst's, and it was ultimately titled Hearst's International in May 1922. To spare serious cutbacks at San Simeon, Hearst merged the magazine Hearst's International with Cosmopolitan effective March 1925. But while the Cosmopolitan title on the cover remained at a typeface of eighty-four points, over time the typeface of Hearst's International decreased to thirty-six points and then to a barely legible twelve points. After Hearst died in 1951, the Hearst's International disappeared from the magazine cover altogether in April 1952.

With a circulation of 1,700,000 in the 1930s, Cosmopolitan had an advertising income of $5,000,000. Emphasizing fiction in the 1940s, it was subtitled The Four-Book Magazine since the first section had one novelette, six or eight short stories, two serials, six to eight articles, and eight or nine special features, while the other three sections featured two novels and a digest of current non-fiction books. During World War II, sales peaked at 2,000,000.

The magazine began to run less fiction during the 1950s. By 1955, the rise of paperbacks and television overshadowed magazines, causing circulation to drop to slightly over a million. The Golden Age of magazines came to an end as mass-market, general-interest publications gave way to special-interest magazines targeting specialized audiences.

=== Under Helen Gurley Brown ===
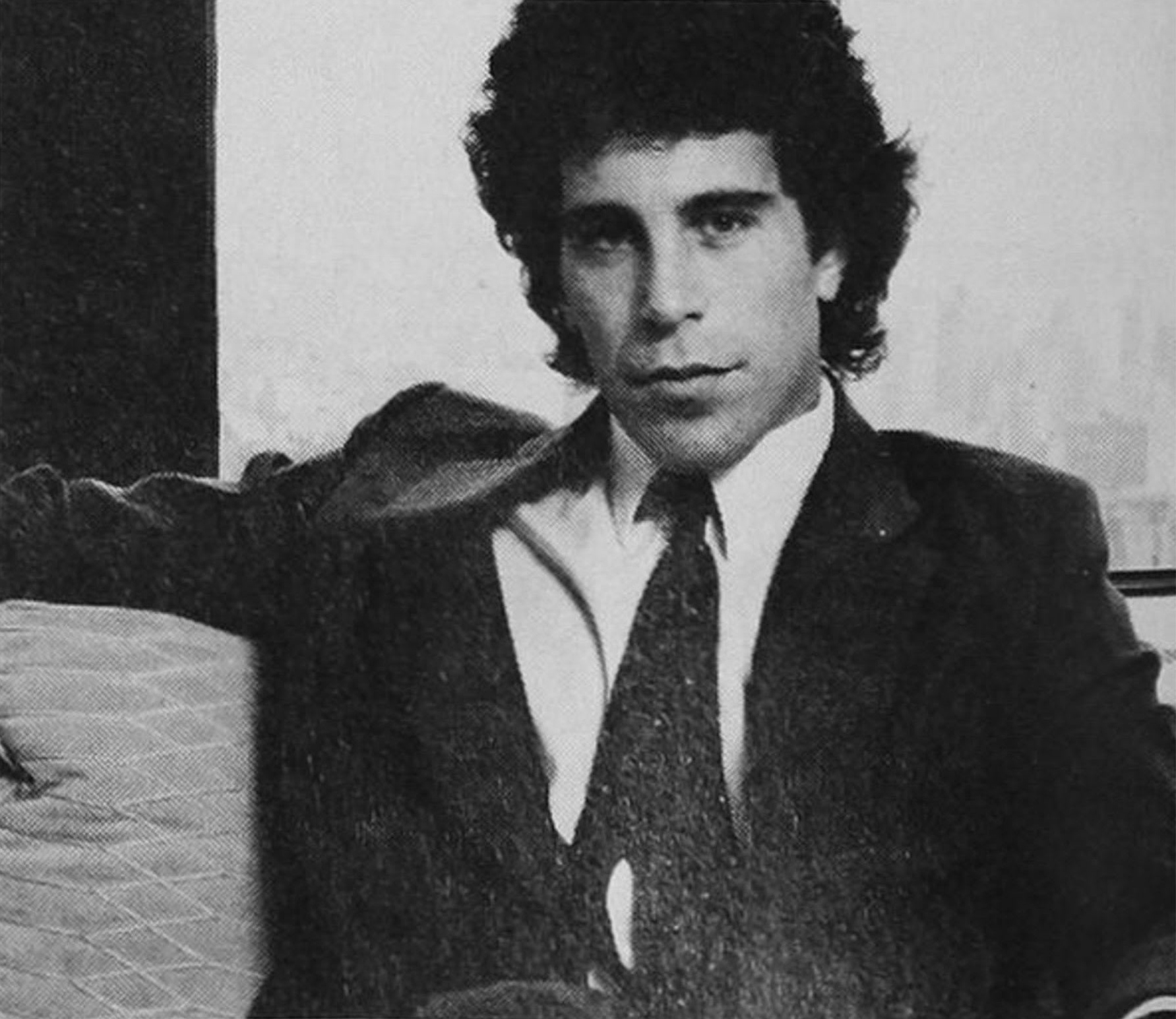
Jeffrey Epstein was the magazine's "Bachelor of the month" in the July 1980 issue.

Cosmopolitan's circulation continued to decline for another decade until Helen Gurley Brown became chief editor in 1965 and radically changed the magazine. Brown remodeled and reinvented it as a magazine for modern single career women, completely transforming the magazine into a racy, contentious, and successful magazine. As the editor for 32 years, Brown spent this time using the magazine as an outlet to erase stigma around unmarried women not only having sex but also enjoying it. Known as a "devout feminist", Brown was often attacked by critics due to her progressive views on women and sex. She believed that women were allowed to enjoy sex without shame in all cases. She died in 2012 at the age of 90. Her vision is still evident in the design of the magazine. The magazine eventually adopted a cover format consisting of a usually young female model (or prominent female celebrity), typically in a low-cut dress, bikini, or some other revealing outfit.

The magazine distinguished itself by openly discussing sexuality from the viewpoint that women can and should enjoy sex without guilt. The first issue under Helen Gurley Brown, July 1965, featured an article on the birth control pill, which had gone on the market exactly five years earlier.

This magazine was not Brown's first publication dealing with sexually liberated women. Her 1962 advice book, Sex and the Single Girl, had been a bestseller. After the book's release, Brown received a flood of fan mail pleading for her advice on various topics related to women's behavior, sexual encounters, health, and beauty. Brown sent the message that a woman should have men complement her life, not take it over. Enjoying sex without shame was also a message she incorporated in both publications.

In Brown's early years as editor, the magazine received heavy criticism. In 1968 at the feminist Miss America protest, protestors symbolically threw several feminine products into a "Freedom Trash Can." These included copies of Cosmopolitan and Playboy magazines. Cosmopolitan also ran a near-nude centerfold of actor Burt Reynolds in April 1972, causing great controversy and attracting much attention. The Latin American edition of Cosmopolitan was launched in March 1973.

In April 1978, a single edition of Cosmopolitan Man was published as a trial, targeted to appeal to men. Its cover featured Jack Nicholson and Aurore Clément. It was published twice in 1989 as a supplement to Cosmopolitan.

In its January 1988 issue, Cosmopolitan published a feature that suggested women had little reason to be concerned about contracting HIV, despite the fact that the best available medical science indicated otherwise. The piece claimed that unprotected sex with an HIV-positive man did not put women at risk of infection and went on to state that "most heterosexuals are not at risk" and that it was impossible to transmit HIV in the missionary position. This article angered many educated people, including AIDS and gay rights activists. The protests organized in response to the article's publication were turned into a 30-minute documentary titled "Doctors, Liars, and Women: AIDS Activists Say NO to Cosmo" by two members of ACTUP, a New York City-based collective of HIV/AIDS activists.

One of the articles in its October 1989 issue, "The Risky Business of Bisexual Love," promoted the 'bisexual bridge' theory. The 'bisexual bridge' theory suggests that heterosexual women are unknowingly put at risk for contracting HIV through sexual contact with bisexual men who covertly have sex with other men (colloquially described as being "on the down low"). The New York Area Bisexual Network performed a successful letter-writing campaign against Cosmopolitan.

== Approach ==
Since the 1960s, Cosmopolitan has discussed such topics as health, fitness, and fashion, as well as sex. The magazine has also featured a section called "Ask Him Anything", where a male writer answers readers' questions about men and dating.

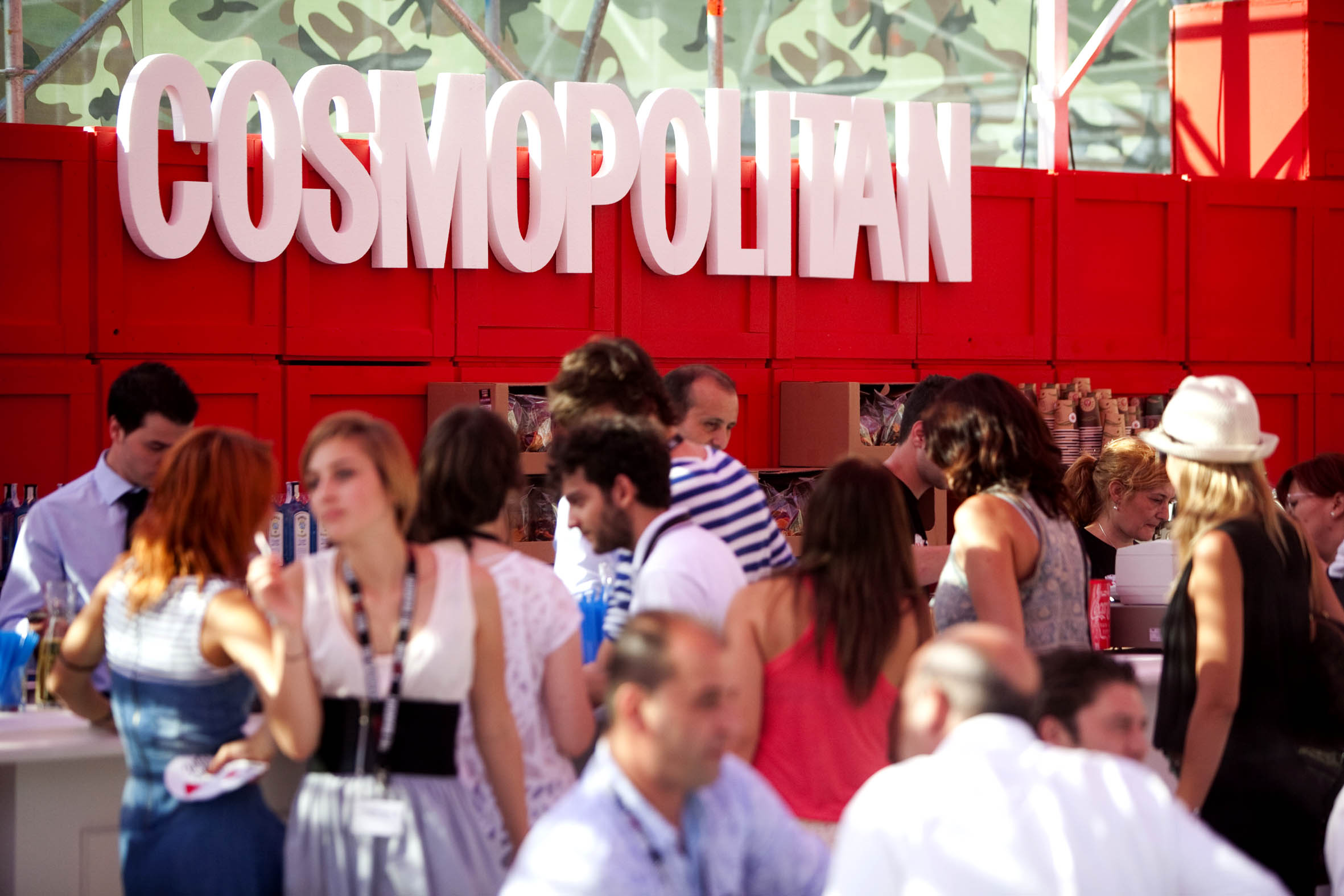
Cosmopolitan stand at The Brandery fashion show (Barcelona, 2010)

The magazine, in particular its cover stories, has become increasingly sexually explicit in tone. In 2000, the grocery chain Kroger, at the time the second largest in the US after Walmart, began covering up Cosmopolitan at checkout stands because of complaints about sexually inappropriate headlines. The UK edition of Cosmopolitan, which began in 1972, was the first Cosmopolitan magazine to branch out to another country. Deirdre McSharry edited it from 1973 to 1985 targeting career women in their twenties. It was well known for sexual explicitness, with strong sexual language, male nudity, and coverage of such subjects as rape. In 1999, CosmoGIRL!, a spinoff magazine targeting a teenage female audience, was created for international readership. It shut down in December 2008.

During 2015, Cosmopolitan found popularity in a then-newfound medium, the "discover" section on Snapchat. At the time, Cosmopolitan's "discover" had over 3 million readers a day.

In October 2018, Bauer Media Group announced that after 45 years, publication of the Australian edition of Cosmopolitan would stop due to the commercial viability of the magazine no longer being sustainable. In March 2022 the Russian edition, Cosmopolitan Russia, changed its title to Voice after Hearst revoked its affiliation following the invasion of Ukraine.

On the cover of its October 2018 issue, Cosmopolitan featured plus-sized model Tess Holliday. Some people, such as TV presenter Piers Morgan, criticized this choice, arguing that it amounted to promoting obesity. Editor of Cosmopolitan Farrah Storr called the cover choice a bold stance in favor of body positivity. In December 2020, actress Emma Roberts became the first pregnant celebrity to appear on the cover of the magazine.

Notable employees during this period include Shiona Turini.

== Awards and features ==
=== Fun, Fearless Male of the Year ===
For over a decade, the February issue has featured this award. In 2011, Russell Brand received the magazine's Fun, Fearless Male of the Year Award, joining Kellan Lutz and Paul Wesley (2010), John Mayer (2008), Nick Lachey (2007), Patrick Dempsey (2006), Josh Duhamel (2005), Matthew Perry (2004), and Jon Bon Jovi (2003).

=== Fun, Fearless Female of the Year ===
The Fun, Fearless Female of the Year award was awarded to Kayla Itsines (2015), Nicole Scherzinger (2012), Mila Kunis (2011), Anna Faris (2010), Ali Larter (2009), Katherine Heigl (2008), Eva Mendes (2007), Beyoncé (2006), Ashlee Simpson (2005), Alicia Silverstone (2004), Sandra Bullock (2003), Britney Spears (2002), Debra Messing (2001), Jennifer Love Hewitt (2000), Shania Twain (1999), and Ashley Judd (1998).

=== Cosmopolitan Men—The Making of the World's Sexiest Calendar ===
Cosmopolitan Men released a video on The Making of the World's Sexiest Calendar in 1994 followed by a 14-month Cosmopolitan Men Calendar. Photographer Richard Reinsdorf shot the entire Calendar and helped direct the video.

=== Anniversary Male Centerfolds ===
Cosmopolitan releases a Male Centerfold issue every few years that features hot male celebrities from the United States. Here is a partial list of the men who have appeared in Cosmopolitan's Centerfold Editions over the years: Burt Reynolds 1972, Jim Brown 1973, John Davidson 1975, Arnold Schwarzenegger 1977, Scott Brown 1982, David Hasselhoff 1990. Male super-model Tracy James was named Cosmopolitan's 25th Anniversary Centerfold in 1995: his centerfold garnered so much attention that Cosmopolitan printed an extra 500,000 copies to meet demand. Cosmopolitan's Editor-in-Chief Helen Gurley Brown sat with James for interviews on America's Talking and on Oprah with Oprah Winfrey, on how the magazine's editors and scouts searched America over the course of a year, seeing thousands of men before deciding on James.

=== Bachelor of the Year ===
The November issue of Cosmopolitan showcases the most attractive bachelors from all 50 states. Pictures and profiles of all the bachelors are posted on www.cosmopolitan.com, where readers view and vote for their favorite, narrowing it down to six finalists. A team of Cosmopolitan editors then selects the Bachelor of the Year, who is announced at an annual party and media event in New York. The 50 bachelors generally appear on programs such as Today.

Past winners include:

- Ryan Anderson 2017
- Ryan Chenevert 2012
- Chris Van Vliet 2011
- Ryan "Mickey" McLean 2010
- Brad Ludden 2008
- Brian Watkins 2007
- Matt Wood 2006

=== Practice Safe Sun ===
In the May 2006 issue of Cosmopolitan, the magazine launched the Practice Safe Sun campaign, an initiative aimed at fighting skin cancer by asking readers to stop all forms of tanning other than tanning from a bottle. In conjunction with the campaign, Cosmopolitan's editor-in-chief, Kate White, approached Congresswoman Carolyn Maloney, known for her support of women's health issues, with concerns that women were not fully aware of the dangers of indoor tanning and the effectiveness of the current warning labels. After careful review, the congresswoman agreed that it was necessary to recommend that the FDA take a closer look. She and Representative Ginny Brown-Waite introduced the Tanning Accountability and Notification Act (TAN Act—H.R. 4767) on February 16, 2006. President Bush signed the act in September 2007, and the new federal law requires the FDA to scrutinize the warning labels on tanning beds and issue a report by September 2008.

=== Cosmopolitan, The Fragrance ===
In May 2015, Cosmopolitan UK announced they were launching their first-ever fragrance. This is considered a first in the magazine industry. Named 'Cosmopolitan, The Fragrance', the perfume takes on the notion of their much-loved phrase 'Fun, Fearless Female' and was set to launch in September.

== Politics ==
=== Seventeenth Amendment ===
Cosmopolitan played a role in passing the Seventeenth Amendment to the US Constitution, which allowed for the popular election of US Senators (previously they were elected by state legislatures). In 1906, William Randolph Hearst hired David Graham Phillips to write a series of articles entitled "The Treason of the Senate". These articles, which were largely sensationalized, helped galvanize public support for this cause.

=== Candidate endorsement ===
In September 2014, Cosmopolitan began endorsing political candidates. The endorsements are based on "established criteria" agreed upon by the magazine's editors. Specifically, Cosmopolitan will only endorse candidates that support equal pay laws, legal abortion, free contraceptives, and gun control and oppose voter identification laws. Amy Odell, editor of Cosmopolitan.com, has stated that the magazine will always endorse political candidates that are pro-choice: "We're not going to endorse someone who is pro-life because that's not in our readers' best interest." According to Joanna Coles, the magazine's editor-in-chief, the endorsements of Cosmopolitan will focus on "candidates in swing states or candidates who are strongly in favor of issues like contraception coverage or gun control." In the 2014 U.S. elections, Cosmopolitan officially endorsed twelve Democratic candidates. However, only two of them won their respective political campaigns.

=== Campaigns against Cosmopolitan ===
Victoria Hearst, a granddaughter of William Randolph Hearst (founder of Cosmopolitan's parent company) and sister of Patty Hearst, has lent her support to a campaign that seeks to classify Cosmopolitan as harmful under the guidelines of "Material Harmful to Minors" laws. Hearst, the founder of an evangelical Colorado church called Praise Him Ministries, states that "the magazine promotes a lifestyle that can be dangerous to women's emotional and physical well-being. It should never be sold to anyone under 18." According to former model Nicole Weider, who is also part of this campaign, the magazine's marketing is subtly targeting children. Billboards have been hung in states such as Utah, urging the state to ban sales of the magazine.

In 2018, Walmart announced that Cosmopolitan would be removed from checkout lines after the anti-pornography organization National Center on Sexual Exploitation, formerly known as Morality in Media, labeled the magazine as "sexually explicit material".

== Editor in chief (American edition) ==
- Frank P. Smith (1886–1888)
- E. D. Walker (1888)
- John Brisben Walker (1889–1905)
- Bailey Millard (1905–1907)
- S. S. Chamberlain (1907–1908)
- C. P. Narcross (1908–1913)
- Sewell Haggard (1914)
- Edgar Grant Sisson (1914–1917)
- Douglas Z. Doty (1917–1918)
- Ray Long (1918–1931)
- Harry Payne Burton (1931–1942)
- Frances Whiting (1942–1945)
- Arthur Gordon (1946–1948)
- Herbert R. Mayes (1948–1951)
- John J. O'Connell (1951–1959)
- Robert C. Atherton (1959–1965)
- Helen Gurley Brown (1965–1997)
- Bonnie Fuller (1997–1998)
- Kate White (1998–2012)
- Joanna Coles (2012–2016)
- Michele Promaulayko (2016–2018)
- Jessica Giles (2018–2024)
- Willa Bennett (2024–present)

== Other editions ==
Cosmopolitan has 20 international editions, in Bulgaria (2004–present), Czech Republic (1994–present), France (1973–present), Germany (1980–present), Hong Kong (1984–present), India (1996–present), Indonesia (1997–present), Italy (1973–present), Korea (2000–present), Malaysia (2005–2020; 2027–present), Mexico (1973–present), the Middle East (2011–present), the Netherlands (1982–present), the Philippines (1997–present), Slovenia (2001–present), Spain (1976–1978; later relaunched), South Africa (1984–2020; 2027–present), Taiwan (1989–1991; 1992–present), Ukraine (1999–2021; 2024–present), and the United Kingdom (1972–present).

International editions previously existed for Argentina (1996–2019), Armenia (2011–2015), Australia (1973–2018; 2024–2025), Azerbaijan (2011–2015), Bolivia, Brazil (1973–2018), Central America, Chile (2006–2019), China (1998–2023), Colombia (1973–2019), Croatia (1998–2021), Cyprus (2001–2020), Ecuador (1973–2019), Estonia (2004–2015), Finland (1999–2022), Georgia (2006–2020), Greece (1979–2020), Hungary (1997–2020), Israel (2009–2016), Japan (1979–2005; 2016–2024), Kazakhstan (2003–2020), Kenya (2004–~2006), Latvia (2002–2020), Lithuania (1998–2020), Mongolia (2010–2020), Norway (2005–2013), Paraguay, Peru (1998–2019), Poland (1997–2019), Portugal (1992–2020), Romania (1999–2022), Russia (1994–2022), Serbia (2004–?), Singapore (2011–2015), Sri Lanka (2016–2020; 2025–2025), Sweden (2001–2020), Thailand (1997–2020), Turkey (1992–2020; 2024–2025), Uruguay, Venezuela (1973–2018), and Vietnam (2010–2016).

=== Cosmopolitan Australia ===
Cosmopolitan Australia was launched in May 1973. It continued publication until December 2018, when the license holder, Bauer Media axed the title, stating that it was no longer commercially viable. In 2023 it was reported that Hearst wanted to relaunch Cosmopolitan in Australia. The publication was relaunched in August of 2024. It closed again at the end of 2025 / beginning of 2026.

==== Editors ====
Editor	Start year	End year	Ref.
Sylvia Rayner	1973	1988	
Pat Ingram	1988	1996	
Mia Freedman	1996	2005	
Sarah Wilson	2003	2007	
Bronwyn McCahon	2006	2016	
Claire Askew	2016	2017	
Keshnee Kemp	2017	2018	
Lorna Gray	2018	2018	
Tessa Ogle	2024	2026	

=== Cosmopolitan Italy ===
In 1973 there was a merger between Cosmopolitan and the Italian magazine Arianna, published by Mondadori since 1957, assuming the name Cosmopolitan Arianna. From January 1976 the masthead changed to the current Cosmopolitan. In 1996 the magazine, owned by Della Schiava Editore, ended its publication, which resumed with Mondadori in 2000, with the editor Silvia Brena. In July 2010 Cosmopolitan passed to the editorial Hearst Magazines Italia, becoming a monthly magazine.
