= Atmos =

Atmos may refer to:

== Technology ==
- ATMOS 2000, a 155 mm/52 calibre self-propelled gun system
- Atmos clock, a mechanical torsion pendulum clock manufactured by Jaeger-LeCoultre
- Dolby Atmos, a surround sound technology
- EMC Atmos, a cloud storage services platform
- Ford FX-Atmos, a concept car built by the Ford Motor Company
- Oric Atmos, a model of 6502-based home computer

== Other ==
- Ambience (sound recording) (also atmos), the sounds of a given location or space in filmmaking
- ATMOS, a fictional technology introduced in the 2008 Doctor Who episode "The Sontaran Stratagem"
- Atmos (album), by Czech bassist Miroslav Vitouš featuring Norwegian saxophonist Jan Garbarek
- Atmos (EP), by South Korean boy band Shinee
- Atmos (comics), a fictional character from DC Comics
- ATMOS (festival), the annual techno-management festival of BITS Pilani, Hyderabad Campus
- Atmos Energy, one of the United States' largest natural-gas-only distributors
- Atmos Rewards, frequent-flyer program of Alaska and Hawaiian Airlines
- ATMOS Software, one of two developers of the video game Escape Velocity Nova
- Workshop on Algorithmic Approaches for Transportation Modeling, Optimization and Systems, a conference co-located with the European Symposium on Algorithms

== See also ==
- Atos (disambiguation)
