= Jessica Michault =

American fashion journalist

- Occupations: Journalist, fashion critic
- Notable credit(s): The New York Times,The International Herald Tribune, Nowfashion, Elite Traveler, SHOWSTUDIO, Designare, Business of Fashion, Vogue Japan
- Awards: Business of Fashion 500

Jessica Michault is an American fashion journalist who has worked at ODDA magazine.

== Biography ==
Born in San Francisco, Michault studied Political Science at Dickinson College.

Prior to becoming Nowfashion's editor-in-chief in 2012, Michault worked for 16 years at the International Herald Tribune under Suzy Menkes as the newspaper's Online Style Editor. She also contributes to France 24's culture chronicles with a fashion segment.

In 2013, she was included in the inaugural Business of Fashion 500, a curated list of the fashion industry's most influential members.

From 2024 to 2025, Michault served as the editor-in-chief of Madame Arabia.

== Publications ==
- First Christian Dior collection by Raf Simons, NOWFASHION, 2 July 2012
- Profile of Jessica Michault by Business of Fashion, Business of Fashion, October 2013
- Jessica Michault contribution to Punk on the Runway on SHOWSTUDIO, SHOWSTUDIO, June 2013
- Colorful Leggings - Vogue.it, Vogue Italia, 27 January 2011
