= Vestoj =

- Discipline: Fashion
- Language: English
- Edited by: Anja Aronowsky Cronberg

Publication details
- History: 2009-present
- Frequency: Annual

Standard abbreviations
- ISO 4: Vestoj

Indexing
- ISSN: 2000-4036

Links
- Journal homepage

Vestoj (meaning "clothing" in Esperanto) is an annual academic journal about dress and fashion. The editor-in-chief and publisher is Anja Aronowsky Cronberg.

== History ==
Vestoj – the Journal of Sartorial Matters was established by editor-in-chief and publisher Anja Aronowsky Cronberg in 2009. It sets out to "combine theoretical knowledge about fashion with experience from the fashion industry. In the first issue a manifesto was formulated that more than anything was about bridging the gap between fashion as an academic subject of study and fashion as a business". It "stands apart from the current crop of new magazines because of its consciously intellectual stance". Vestoj combines scholarly texts about fashion with fiction, nonfiction, poetry, and visuals. Each issue is thematic and its subject matter is reflected in both editorial content and art direction. Every issue consequently has a different logo, style, format, and graphic design. Vestoj differs from most fashion magazines, in that they contain no advertising and do not revolve around the fashion seasonal calendar.

== Reception ==
Vestoj has been called "one of the most successful attempts to provide the young academic discipline fashion studies with an equivalent to, say, the medical journal The Lancet", and journalist Fredrik Strage labelled Vestoj's first issue as one of the best new magazines in 2009. The journal was also described as a publication that "connects intellectual strength and aesthetic refinement" and Svenska Dagbladet said that "flicking through Vestoj gives rise to the same feeling of pleasure that enjoying an old 1950s issue of Reader's Digest: it's engaging, charming, personal and tongue in cheek – without ever compromising the intellectual quality".

In an interview on AnOthermag.com, Aronowsky Cronberg explains her approach, stating that Vestoj aims to have "an intelligent and multi-facetted approach to sartorial matters. What I find the most interesting methodology is the one that deals with both the production and consumption of a garment, as well as with the analysis of it. [...] Through the study of fashion you can understand any given point in history, our desires, ideals, wants and needs. The aspect of fashion that deals with voracious consumption has spread into every way we relate to culture; today we consume ideas, knowledge and people as much as we consume goods. Fashion in that sense is nothing short of a Gesamtkunstwerk."
