= Asics Gel-Lyte III =

Line of shoes by Asics

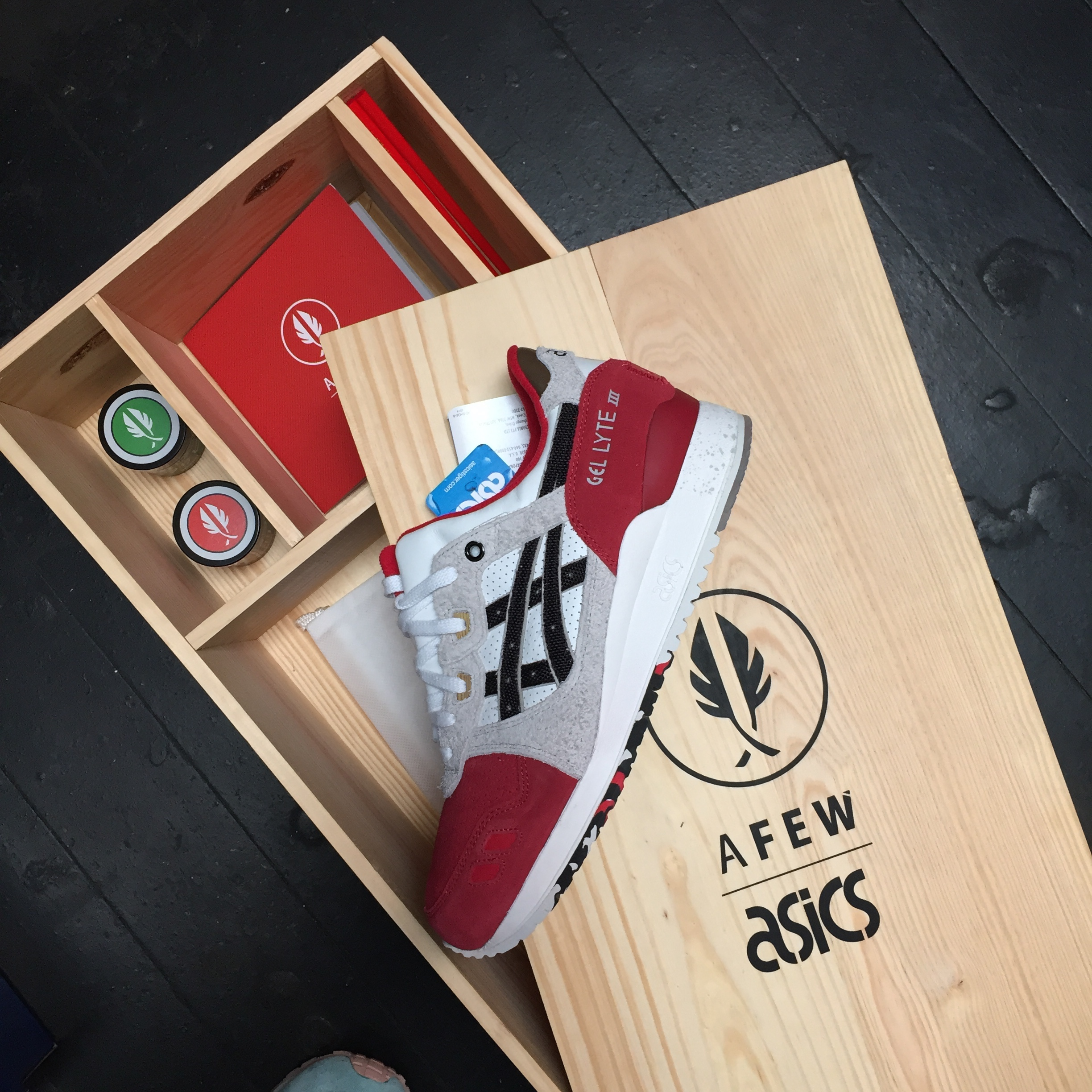
- Type: Sneakers
- Inventor: Asics
- Inception: 1990; 36 years ago
- Manufacturer: Asics
- Available: Yes
- Website: asics.com

Asics Gel-Lyte III is a running shoe released by Asics as part of the Gel-Lyte series in 1990. The shoe is considered to be the company's most popular shoe seeing the most sales and collaborations out of all of its total products. The shoe has gone on to become an important part of sneakerhead culture and both modern and retro fashion. It is one of three important products for the company, alongside the Mexico 66 and Gel-Kayano 14.

== Overview ==
The shoe was designed by Shigeyuki Mitsui who joined the company in 1984. Mitsui had worked on previous models before but the Gel-Lyte III was one of the shoes that he designed 100% by himself. He initially designed it as a lightweight option for everyday use and training. What made the shoe unique for its time was the triple-density sole used for cushioning, the exposed gel packs that the company frequently used in its shoes, and the split tongue which allowed to more easily put on the shoe.

The shoe only lasted in the market for 2 years before Asics replaced it with the Gel-Lyte Ultra in 1992. Despite its old age, the shoe quickly gained a following among many consumers who loved the shoe for its unique design and original silhouette. Asics decided to capitalize on this and reintroduced the shoe in 2006 as a lifestyle shoe. It wouldn't be until the summer of 2007 when the shoe would become more popular due to all of the collaborations that the company did.

The shoe would see a second wave and boost in the mid-2010s which help solidify the shoe as a staple in sneaker culture and help elevate the company's image outside of the athletic market.

== Models ==
=== Gel-Lyte 3.1 ===
Released in May 2016, the shoe features the normal upper of the Gel-Lyte III but with the bottom of the Gel-Nimbus 17.
