= Magazine of Female Fashions of London & Paris =

Defunct women monthly fashion magazine

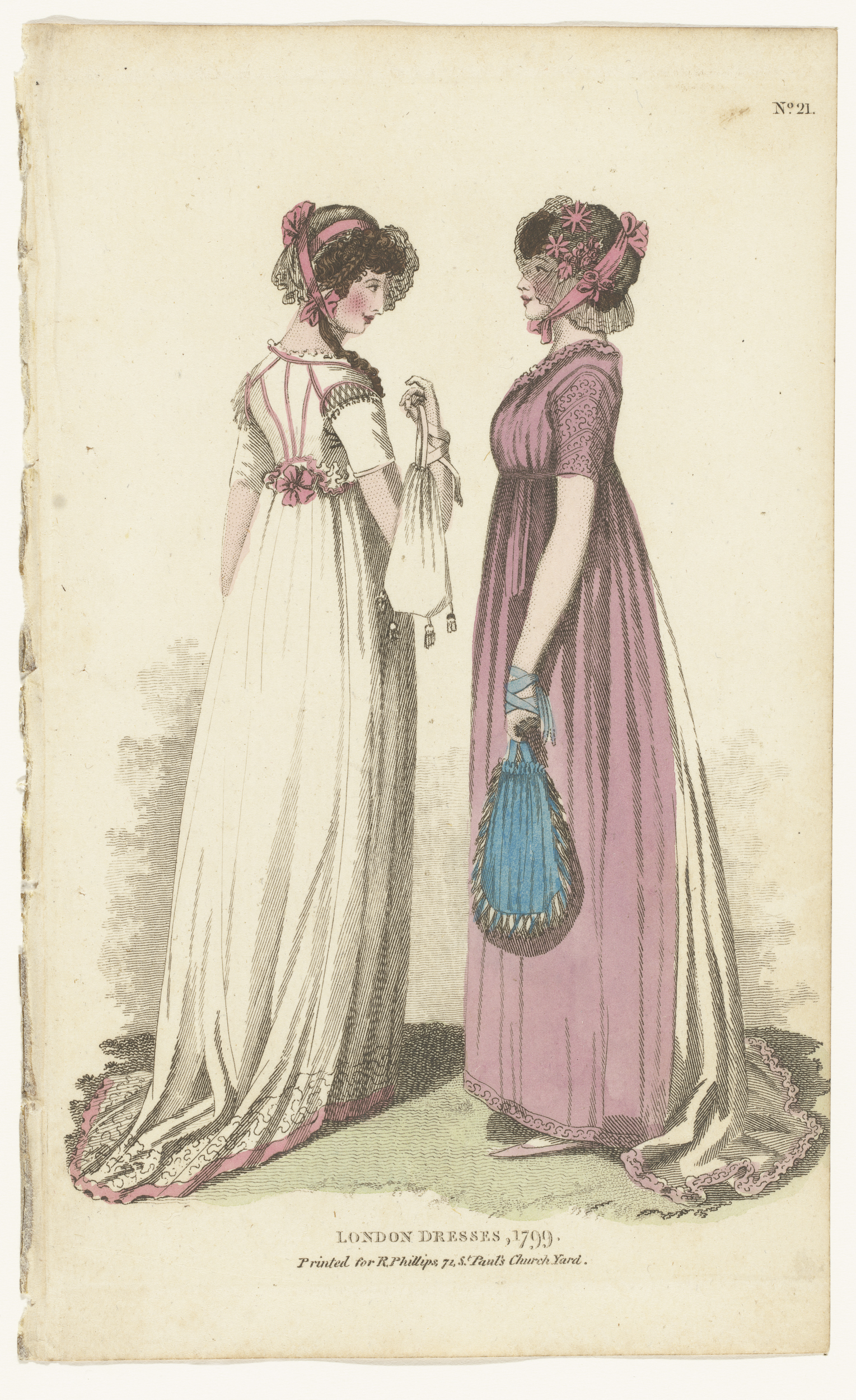
London Dresses in Magazine of Female Fashions of London and Paris, No. 21 (1799).

The Magazine of Female Fashions of London & Paris was a monthly illustrated fashion magazine published under that title from 1798 until 1806, and then continued until 1809 under the title Record of Fashion and Court Elegance.

Initially printed for Richard Phillips in London, from 1807 to 1809 it was published by Orme, Harris and Walker, and was compiled under the direction of Mrs Fiske.

It was unusual among women's magazines of the time in being devoted entirely to fashion. It was advertised in 1799 as "a Monthly Work, price 1s. 6d. each Number Containing three or four beautifully coloured Plates, representing the actually prevailing Female Fashions of London and Paris, for the use of Milliners, &c."
