= Ford FX-Atmos =

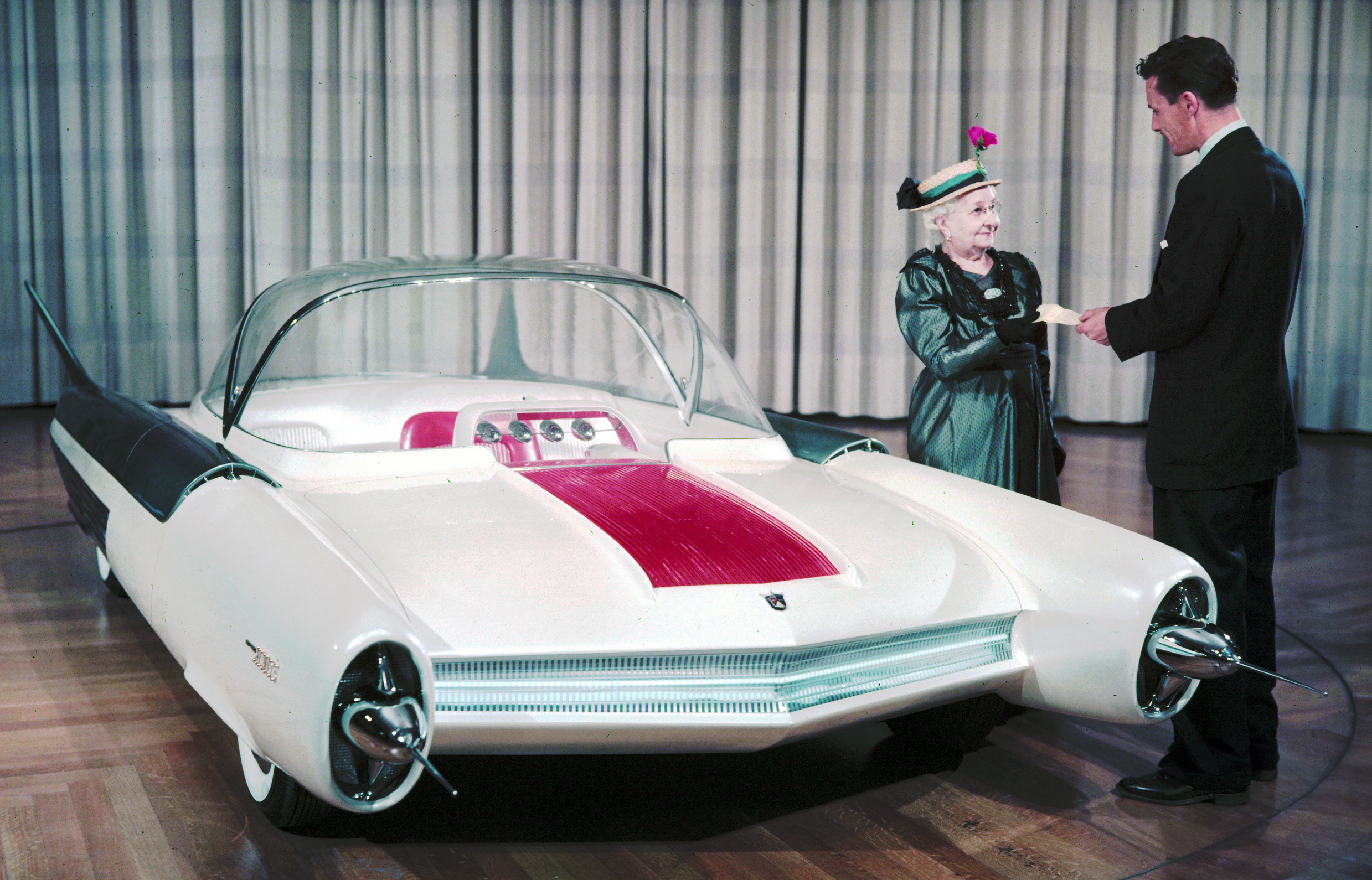

Overview
- Manufacturer: Ford Motor Company
- Model years: 1954

Body and chassis
- Layout: Mid engine, rear wheel drive

Dimensions
- Wheelbase: 2,667 mm (105.0 in)
- Length: 5,601 mm (220.5 in)
- Width: 2,024 mm (79.7 in)
- Height: 1,222 mm (48.1 in)

The Ford FX-Atmos was a concept car built by the Ford Motor Company for the 1954 Chicago Auto Show. According to one source, it was considered as a candidate for a nuclear power plant.

It was styled after jet aircraft, with headlight/ front fender pods mounting radio antennas and bearing a strong resemblance to ramjet air intakes; it also had rocket exhaust styled taillights, and prominent tail fins. The cabin set the driver on the centerline and provided two rear seats, all under a clear dome. The driver's controls and instruments were also futuristic, with dual handgrips instead of a steering wheel and a screen on the dash intended to display radar sourced highway information.

It has been suggested that the FX-Atmos was a significant inspiration in the design of Supercar in the Gerry Anderson TV series of that name.
