= Cosmopolitan Russia =

Women's magazine in Russia (1994–2022)

- Categories: Women's magazine
- Frequency: Monthly
- Publisher: Fashion Press
- Founded: 1994
- First issue: May 1994
- Final issue: March 2022
- Company: Sanoma Independent Media
- Country: Russia
- Based in: Moscow
- Language: Russian

Cosmopolitan Russia was the Russian edition of Cosmopolitan magazine. It was the first international women's magazine published in the post-Soviet period in Russia. It changed its title to The Voice Mag and ended its affiliation with Cosmopolitan magazine in March 2022 following the Russian invasion of Ukraine.

== History and profile ==
Cosmopolitan Russia was established in 1994. The first issue was published in May 1994 and featured Cindy Crawford on the cover. The founding editors were Ellen Verbeek, a Dutch journalist, and Elena Myasnikova, a Russian journalist. Its headquarters was in Moscow.

The magazine was part of Sanoma Independent Media, a subsidiary of Sanoma company. The Independent Media was founded by Derk Sauer and was acquired by the Finnish media company SanomaWSOY in 2005. Cosmopolitan Russia was published by Fashion Press on a monthly basis. The owners of Fashion Press were Sanoma and Hearst Shkulev Media, a subsidiary of the Hearst. As of 2015 the editor-in-chief of the magazine which targets women was Polina Sokhranova. Maya Akisheva served as its Kazakhstan editor.

In June 2015 Sanoma Independent Media planned to sell the publisher of Cosmopolitan Russia, Fashion Press, to its partner Hearst Shkulev Media. However, the proposal was rejected by the Russian Federal Anti-Monopoly Service. In May 2022 Russian company Independent Media announced that the title would be replaced by local brands.

== Circulation ==
The first issue of the magazine sold 50,000 copies. In 2005 Cosmopolitan Russia sold 1,000,000 copies and was acknowledged by the Guinness Book of Records as the magazine with the largest number of copies. The circulation of the monthly was 1,050,000 copies in 2009. Between May and October 2014 the magazine had a circulation of 800,000 copies.
