= Fashion Forward =

Israeli fashion magazine

Fashion Forward is an Israeli style magazine published in Tel Aviv by Ofer Yeger and Shelly Peleg.

== History ==
The first issue of Fashion Forward was published in 2009 in an on-line folding technique. In March 2011, it was acquired in a 700k NIS deal by mako.co.il web portal. The portal forwarded the initial domain name, and included the Fashion Forward section to match the style and design platform of Israeli television broadcaster Keshet.

In September 2011, Fashion Forward published an exposé on Vogue's Fashion's Night out in London, including interviews with Alexandra Shulman and Samantha Cameron. A following piece covered London Fashion Week.

== See also ==
- Israeli fashion
- List of fashion magazines
