= JJJJound =

Canadian label and web site

- Website type: image sharing, brand label
- Available in: English
- Owner: Justin Saunders
- Website: www.jjjjound.com
- Launched: 2006; 20 years ago

JJJJound is a Canadian image sharing moodboard, minimalist menswear label and design studio based in Montreal. JJJJound was founded by Justin R. Saunders in 2006 as a personal blog. Saunders completely removed text from his photo blog and it became his very personal "moodboard". His updates were referred to as new moods. The blog visitors and users would scroll down, a never-ending stream of images. Saunders concept was to create a "wordless" website. JJJJound later emerged as a label, creating collabs with New Balance, Puma and Adidas.

== See also ==
- FFFFound
