= Ray Li =

Chinese fashion magazine

- Categories: Women's fashion magazine
- Frequency: Monthly
- Publisher: China Light Industry Publishing Press; Rayli Magazine House
- Founded: 1995
- Country: China
- Based in: Beijing
- Language: Chinese
- Website: Ray Li

Ray Li (Chinese: 瑞丽; pinyin: Ruìlí) is a monthly fashion magazine published in Beijing, China, with regional offices in Guangzhou and Shanghai, catering to affluent urban women in their twenties and thirties. The magazine is the Chinese version of the Japanese magazine with the same name.

== History and profile ==
Ray Li was established in 1995. The publishers are China Light Industry Publishing Press and Rayli Magazine House. The magazine is published on a monthly basis and has its headquarters in Beijing.

Most of the articles are from Japanese fashion magazines with local advertisement, selling mostly Western (some Korean and Japanese) merchandise. There are three versions of the magazine, each designed for specific age groups. One for women in their 20s, one for women in their 30s and a high fashion version. The magazine has sister brands in other fields.
