= Herbert Mayes =

Herbert Raymond Mayes (1900 – October 30, 1987) was an American journalist and magazine editor, best known for serving as editor of Good Housekeeping and McCall's, from which he retired in 1965.

Mayes became managing editor of Good Housekeeping in 1937, and editor the following year. He took over McCall's in 1958 and made it the highest circulation of the "Seven Sisters". He became president of the McCall Corporation in 1962.
