= BASIC Magazine =

American fashion magazine

- Editor-in-Chief: Viktorija Pashuta
- Categories: Fashion and Lifestyle Magazine
- Frequency: Quarterly
- Publisher: BASIC Media Company LLC
- Founded: 2016
- First issue: February 2016
- Country: USA
- Based in: Beverly Hills, CA
- Language: English
- Website: www.basic-magazine.com
- ISSN: 2470-153X

BASIC Magazine is a fashion magazine based in Beverly Hills, CA. It is a quarterly publication, founded by a fashion photographer and BASIC CEO & Editor-in-Chief Viktorija Pashuta in 2016. BASIC Magazine is published by BASIC Media Company LLC and distributed Internationally. BASIC Magazine is a registered trademark.

According to BASIC Magazine it "is a first class visual and editorial publication that features carefully curated content with a strong independent voice." BASIC Magazine is published quarterly with pages being inspired by artists, visuals masterpieces and themes that set the tone of the issue. Different sections are included in the a magazine, ranging from latest trends to fashion and art work to projects and inspirational role models.

== History ==
BASIC Magazine first print edition was released in February 2016.

Its viral project Women Superheroes was highlighted on Ads of the World website.

=== Issues ===
- BASIC 1: BASIC Instinct - Cover I Kat Graham and Cover II Josh Mario John
- BASIC 2: BASIC Power - Cover I Jess Glynne and Cover II Geisha by Thom Kerr
- BASIC 3: BASIC Generation - Cover I Benny Harlem and Cover II Olive
- BASIC 4: BASIC Magic- Cover I Dita Von Teese and Cover II Fashion Illustration by Alyona Lavdovskaya
- BASIC 5: BASIC Vibez - Cover I Pia Mia and Cover II Dollz
- BASIC 6: BASIC Rebel - Cover I Shiva Safai and Cover II Women Superheroes
- BASIC 7: BASIC Present. Past. Future. - Cover I David Guetta and Cover II Art Cover
- BASIC 8: BASIC Voyage - Cover I Michelle Rodriguez and Cover II Sofia Boutella
- BASIC 9: BASIC Saga - Cover I Tyga and Cover II Art Cover Picasso
- BASIC 10:BASIC Spectacle - Cover I Steve Aoki Cover II Isla Fisher Cover III Zara Larsson Cover IV Cirque Du Soleil
- BASIC 11: BASIC IDENTITY- Cover I Chloe Flower Cover II Madison Beer Cover III Ego-Fashion Cover IIII Alpha Female
- BASIC 12: BASIC Metamorphosis - Cover I Karol G Cover II Metamorphosis
- BASIC 13: BASIC Code - Cover I Alison Brie Cover II Fashion Zeitgeist of 2020
- BASIC 14: BASIC Muse - Cover I H.E.R. Cover II Back to the Future Art Cover
- BASIC 15: BASIC Paradox - Cover I Michele Morrone Cover II Rene Gruau Cover III Circus Cover IIII Keke Palmer
- BASIC 16: BASIC Rebirth - Cover I Bebe Rexha
- BASIC 17: BASIC Stamina - Cover I Megan Fox Cover II Salt Bae
- BASIC 18: BASIC Vendetta - Cover I Ava Max Cover II Nicole Sherzinger Cover III Lele Pons
- BASIC 19: BASIC Evolution - Cover I Avril Lavigne
- BASIC 20: BASIC Influence- Cover I Hannah Stocking Cover II Viktorija Pashuta Cover III Jackson Chong
- BASIC 21: BASIC Stardom - Cover I Lay Zhang Cover II Charly Jordan
- BASIC 22: BASIC Dominion - Cover I Ozuna
- BASIC 23: BASIC Libido - Cover I David Lachapelle
- BASIC 24: BASIC Valor - Cover I Mike Colter Cover II Aaron McPolin
- BASIC 25: BASIC Supernova - Cover I Tori Kelly Cover II Christian Hogue

== See also ==
- Fashion in the United States
