= Kiko Kostadinov =

Bulgarian fashion designer

- Кико Костадинов
- Born: 1989 (age 36–37); Bulgaria
- Education: Central Saint Martins
- Labels: Kiko Kostadinov; Mackintosh 0001; Asics Novalis; Otto958

Kiko Kostadinov (Bulgarian: Кико Костадинов; born 1989) is a Bulgarian fashion designer based in London. He currently is the creative director of his eponymous label as well as Novalis, an ongoing collaborative brand with ASICS. He previously was the creative director of British heritage brand Mackintosh's premium line Mackintosh 0001. Kostadinov's work is centered on modern-day uniform and contemporary workwear.

== Early life ==
Kostadinov was born in Bulgaria, but emigrated to London at the age of 16. His father was a construction worker, while his mother was a childcare worker and cleaning lady. During his upbringing in Bulgaria, Kostadinov's only exposure to arts and culture was receiving clothes from his uncle who resided in London. Although he was interested in his own personal style, Kostadinov was never exposed to fashion in Bulgaria. Kostadinov's clothing is greatly influenced by fellow designer Yohji Yamamoto. He is also inspired by designers Rick Owens and Christopher Kane.

== Education ==
Kostadinov obtained a degree in information technology before deciding to pursue fashion. He initially enrolled in a foundation course at London College of Fashion, but realized he wanted to attend Central Saint Martins. After being rejected from Central Saint Martins, Kostadinov would assist a number of menswear designers and stylists, such as Aitor Throup, Nicola Formichetti, and Stephan Mann. He was accepted to Central Saint Martins' B.A. fashion design and marketing program two years later. Kostadinov attempted to transfer to the school's menswear program many times, but was repeatedly refused.

Kostadinov returned to Central Saint Martins for his master's degree in fashion. During his education, Kostadinov created commission pieces made from Stüssy clothing for an editorial featured in Clash magazine. Although the clothing was bespoke and never intended to be sold, Stüssy reached out to him to collaborate on a capsule collection to celebrate their 35th anniversary in 2015. Each piece was hand made and took 1–2 days to produce through deconstruction and cut-and-sew. He would use the money earned from the sales to continue his education. Later that year he would release another collection with Stüssy to be sold by Dover Street Market.

== Career ==
Kostadinov experienced little transition from schooling to the runway. After graduating from his master's program in 2016, he would immediately be funded by the British Fashion Council's NEWGEN initiative. In January 2017, he presented his debut collection, characterized by meticulously engineered garments with highly functional cuts and finishes. This theme would pervade his later work.

In November 2017, Kostadinov was appointed as creative director of Mackintosh 0001, a fashion focused offshoot of outerwear brand Mackintosh. Kostadinov's creative direction would be inspired by Italian art movement Arte Povera, characterized by an emphasis on traditional product and material.

Kostadinov partnered with Japanese brand ASICS to produce footwear for his eponymous label's Spring/Summer 2018 collection. The partnership would continue for his Autumn/Winter 2018 collection. In 2018, Kostadinov would also collaborate with Camper to create his own rendition of three of the brand's hiking boots.

In the fall of 2018, Kostadinov introduced a womenswear line to be led by Laura and Deanna Fanning, who had graduated from Central Saint Martins' master program 7 months prior. Deanna Fanning moved from Melbourne to London in 2013 to study at Camberwell College of Art. She joined collaborative efforts with her twin in 2016. In 2024, Deanna and Kiko married. They had originally met at a lecture given by Kim Jones.

In 2019, Kostadinov was a semifinalist for the LVMH Prize for Young Designers which awards winners a 300,000 euro grant along with 12 months of support from the LVMH Group. However he did not progress beyond the semifinalist level. The same year, Kostadinov held an installation at Morán Morán Gallery in Los Angeles titled 'Otto 95.8'. The installation featured coats and bags that drew from Kostadinov's Bulgarian heritage and the workwear of his father's profession. The installation led to the creation of a collaborative diffusion label, Otto 958 (slightly altering the original exhibit's title). Kostadinov has noted that the label began as a hobby, but is now used to test out concept prior to integration with his namesake label (such as coats, rugby hoodies, and Levi jeans).

In 2023, Kostadinov and ASICS formally announced a new line titled 'Novalis' The line is a culmination of several prior collaborations between the brands, taking inspiration from archival ASICS designs. The line is notable for a heavier focus on athletic use, whereas their prior collaborations weren't as focused on utility.

In 2024, Kostadinov would open his first brick-and-mortar store in Tokyo, Japan. The interior of the store would be designed in collaboration with award-winning Japanese architect, Yusuke Seki, and experimental filmmaker, Ryan Trecartin. Later in the year, a second store would open in Los Angeles. Similar to the Tokyo store, the interior design was designed by Ryan Trecartin. The location is in close proximity to Morán Morán Gallery. The same year, Kostadinov would release a collaboration with American jeans company, Levi's. This would be the second time the brands had collaborated, previously creating a limited 'SilverTab' capsule for the Otto958 label.

In 2025, Kostadinov and Fox Racing would collaborate on a capsule for Fox's new fashion-focused line, Fox Lab. The collection featured motocross-inspired jackets, hoodies, long sleeves, jerseys, balaclavas, and racing gloves. A small satellite store would be built in Seoul, Korea as part of the boutique, ADDICTED.
