= Collaborative diffusion =

Type of pathfinding algorithm

Collaborative Diffusion is a type of pathfinding algorithm which uses the concept of antiobjects, objects within a computer program that function opposite to what would be conventionally expected. Collaborative Diffusion is typically used in video games, when multiple agents must path towards a single target agent. For example, the ghosts in Pac-Man. In this case, the background tiles serve as antiobjects, carrying out the necessary calculations for creating a path and having the foreground objects react accordingly, whereas having foreground objects be responsible for their own pathing would be conventionally expected.

Collaborative Diffusion is favored for its efficiency over other pathfinding algorithms, such as A*, when handling multiple agents. Also, this method allows elements of competition and teamwork to easily be incorporated between tracking agents. Notably, the time taken to calculate paths remains constant as the number of agents increases.
