= Madame (magazine) =

German fashion magazine

- Cover of the December 2024 issue, Marine Deleeuw by Zeb Daemen
- Editor-in-Chief: Petra Winter
- Categories: Fashion
- Frequency: Monthly
- Publisher: Heilmaier (from 1952); Medien-Union Ludwigshafen (1984–2010); Media Group Medweth (2010–2017); Bauer Media Group (2018–2020); Beautiful Minds Media (2020–present)
- Total circulation: 296,525 (2025)
- Founded: 1952
- Country: Germany
- Based in: Munich
- Language: German
- Website: madame.de
- ISSN: 0024-936X

Madame (stylised in all caps), is a German monthly fashion magazine. It has been published in Munich since 1952. It is the oldest fashion magazine of German origin in publication.

== Background ==
Madame is a German fashion magazine founded in 1950 as Figaro (till 1952, then as Madame till 1969, then as Madame und Elegante Welt till 1975, as Madame since 1975), it is the oldest fashion magazine of German origin in publication.

The magazine is a monthly publication, published 11 times per year for February, March, April, May, June, July, August, September, October, November, and December.

=== Circulation ===
Newsstand sales and subscriptions (Germany)
Year	1998	2003	2013	2023	2024	2025
Circulation	518,194	496,779	360,371	281,650	282,180	296,525

=== Editors ===
Editor	Start year	End year	Ref.
Heinz Weigt	1950		
Jochen Willke			
Helene-Maria Kurbjeweit-Rose			
Irene Krawehl		2000	
Katrin Riebartsch	2001	2013	
Petra Winter	2014	present	

== History ==
Madame traces its origins to Figaro, Figaro : Zeitschrift der gepflegten Frau (Figaro : Magazine of the well-groomed woman) began publication in 1950. Following a legal dispute with the French newspaper Le Figaro, the magazine rebranded to Madame in 1952. By 1961 the magazine had 1.8 million readers.

In 1961, Time reported on the Madame Club. It was a private members' club operated by the magazine and owned by editor Heinz Weigt. Catering to the new wealthy industrialist class of West Germany, membership was first limited to 1,000 members and would later increase to 2,000 members. Notable members included Hjalmar Schacht, Gina Lollobrigida, Curd Jürgens, Winnie Markus, Max Grundig, Max Schmeling, Ilse Kubaschewski, and Friedrich, 7th Prince Fugger von Babenhausen. The club was originally located at Munich's 12 Brienner Straße and would later move to a nearby hotel. Also in 1961, promoting the magazine and German products, editorial staff and models toured the United States. Actress Winnie Markus, model Angela Stoelze, and actress Hannaleore Cremer travelled as part of the tour.

In 1984, the magazine was acquired by Medien-Union Ludwigshafen, in 2010 Medien-Union sold the publication to Media Group Medweth. Also in 2010, Madame took over the licence for the German edition of L'Officiel Hommes (publishing the title until 2016).

Bauer Media Group acquired the magazine from Media Group Medweth in 2018. Bauer announced the closure of its Munich offices in 2020 and Madame was sold to Beautiful Minds Media. Beautiful Minds Media is a subsidiary of Looping Group, created by Dominik Wichmann (CEO of Looping Group) and Madame editor-in-chief, Petra Winter for the purchase of the magazine.

In 2022, Madame celebrated its 70th anniversary with a party attended by Doris Dörrie and Sibel Kekilli, among others.

The first international spin-off of the magazine Madame Arabia launched in 2024, published by APM (Arabian Publishing Media) and based in Dubai, United Arab Emirates. The magazine was edited by Jessica Michault and since 2025 by Cynthia Kattar.

== Editions ==
- Madame (since 1952, as Figaro from 1950 to 1952)
- Monsieur (since 1970)
- Madame Arabia (since 2024)
- Madame Beauty (ceased publication)
- Madame Collections (ceased publication)
- Madame Living (ceased publication)
