= Cosmopolitan Serbia =

Women's lifestyle mag

Cosmopolitan RS
- Editor-in-Chief: Nasja Veljković
- Categories: Women's magazine
- Frequency: Monthly
- First issue: May 2004
- Company: Adria Media
- Country: Serbia
- Language: Serbian
- Website: www.cosmopolitan.rs

Cosmopolitan Serbia, officially Cosmopolitan Serbia & Montenegro (Serbian: Cosmopolitan Srbija i Crna Gora), is the Serbian edition of women's lifestyle magazine Cosmopolitan. Its first issue was published in May 2004, featuring Mischa Barton on the cover. The headquarters of the magazine is based in Belgrade. Besides Serbia, the magazine is distributed in Montenegro, Bosnia and Herzegovina, and North Macedonia.

The magazine annually organizes "Race on the Heels" (Serbian: Trka na Štiklama) on various spots in Belgrade such as the high street Prince Michael Street or Delta City shopping mall.

According to SMMRI Pradex, the magazine's readership was 194,746 in May 2011 with the issue featuring Ana Ivanovic on its cover in a purple dress shot by John Russo. It was the best selling issue since the issue of October 2004 when Keira Knightley appeared the cover. Ivanović returned to the cover, this time in a white dress, in 2013.

== Editors ==
- Nataša Davidov (2004–2011)
- Jelena Jovanović (2011–2013)
- Nasja Veljković (2013–2021)
