= Ruili Fashion Pioneer =

Simplified Chinese magazine

- Publisher: Beijing Ruili Magazine Agency
- First issue: March 1999
- Final issue: January 2016
- Country: China
- Based in: Beijing
- Language: Chinese

Ruili Fashion Pioneer (Chinese: 瑞丽时尚先锋; pinyin: Ruìlì shíshàng xiānfēng), also known as Ray Li Fashion Pioneer, was a fashion magazine launched in March 1999 under the original name Ruili Cute Pioneer (瑞丽可爱先锋), which was changed to its current name in January 2005.

== Discontinued ==
In January 2016, the printed version of the magazine ceased publication, but its electronic version is retained. A commentator pointed out that the suspension of Ruili Fashion Pioneer was a case of print media being defeated by the new media.
