= Cosmopolitan (Brazil) =

Brazilian women's magazine

- Categories: Women's magazine
- Frequency: Monthly
- Publisher: Editora Abril
- Founded: 1973
- First issue: September 1973
- Final issue: August 2018
- Company: Editora Abril
- Country: Brazil
- Based in: Rio de Janeiro
- Language: Brazilian Portuguese

Cosmopolitan (known as Nova from 1973 to 2015) was a Brazilian monthly women's magazine published by Abril, and part of the international Cosmopolitan group.

== History and profile ==
The magazine was started by Editora Abril in 1973. It was formerly called Nova. The editorial content was based on: love/sex, life/work, famous people, beauty/health and fashion/style. In August 2018, the magazine ceased publication.
