= Jenny Mannerheim =

Swedish art director (born 1977)

Jenny Mannerheim (born 1977), is a Swedish art director and journalist, who has served as the editor-in-chief of L'Officiel St. Barth since 2024 and art director of L'Officiel Riviera since 2021.

== Early life ==
Mannerheim was born in Stockholm, Sweden in 1977. After she graduated high school in 1996 she moved to Paris to study drawing and film. A year later she moved to New York City studying film at New York University, then enrolling at the Parsons School of Design studying communication design. She also spent time studying at Parsons Paris and Central Saint Martins in London.

=== Education ===
Timeline of her education:

- Bachelor of Fine Arts (Design), Parsons Paris, 1997–1998
- Bachelor of Arts (Graphic Design), Central Saint Martins, 1998–1999
- Bachelor of Fine Arts (Communication Design), Parsons School of Design, 1999–2002

== Career ==
Whilst studying at University she began working as the associate art director at PowerHouse Books and worked on the 'Punk Picasso' art book with Larry Clark. She returned to Paris in 2002 and worked as art director at Numéro, Standard, Muteen, Vogue Hommes International and Beaux Arts.

She launched Nuke magazine in 2004 and opened the Galerie Nuke art gallery in Paris. Nuke was a biannual publication with a circulation of 20,000 distributed in French and English. Since then the gallery (now Nuke Mannerheim Gallery) has hosted exhibitions about the work of Jean-Charles de Castalbajac, Lieko Shiga, David Birkin, Devon Dikeou, Kris Van Assche, Latifa Echakhch, Paul Emmanuel, and more.

She co-founded the Each X Other clothing label in 2012 with Ilan Delouis. According to Interview Mannerheim and Delouis were "championing an androgynous mix of unisex clothing". The label would collaborate with Maripol in 2014.

In 2024 she became editor-in-chief of L'Officiel Riviera and L'Officiel St. Barth.

In recent years she has worked as an art director across multiple Éditions Jalou publications (Jalouse, L'Officiel Art, L'Officiel USA, L'Officiel Voyage), she also worked with brands including Diesel, Lancôme, Nissan, PlayStation, Tommy Hilfiger, and others.

=== Timeline ===
Timeline of her notable occupations:

- Associate Art Director at PowerHouse Books, 2001–2003
- Art Director at Numéro, 2003–2005
- Art Director at Vogue Hommes International, 2004–2006
- Art Director at Beaux Arts, 2006–2008
- Art Director at John F. Kennedy Center for the Performing Arts, 2009–2013
- Art Director at L'Officiel St. Barth, 2015–present
- Art Director at L'Officiel Art, 2019–present
- Art Director at L'Officiel Riviera, 2021–present
- Editor-in-Chief at L'Officiel Riviera, 2024–2025
- Editor-in-Chief at L'Officiel St. Barth, 2024–present
