= L'Officiel =

French fashion magazine

- Cover of the March 2000 issue, Nina Heimlich by Christophe Kutner
- Editor-in-Chief: Vanessa Bellugeon
- Categories: Fashion
- Frequency: Bimonthly (7x per year)
- Publisher: Dr. Feridun Hamdullahpur
- Total circulation: 645,135 (2017)
- Founder: Amédée-Martin Brunhes
- First issue: 20 July 1921; 105 years ago
- Company: Éditions Edouard Max Brunhes (1921–1984); Éditions Jalou (1984–2022); The Generation Essentials Group (2022–present)
- Country: France
- Based in: Paris
- Language: French
- Website: lofficiel.com
- ISSN: 0030-0403

L'Officiel (French pronunciation: [lɔfisjɛl]; stylised in all caps), full name L'Officiel de la couture et de la mode de Paris ("The Official [publication] of Paris Couture and Fashion"), also known as L'Officiel Paris, is a French bimonthly fashion magazine that covers haute couture, ready-to-wear fashion, beauty, culture, design, and jewellery. Under the control of the Jalou family from the 1960s until the 2022 acquisition of Éditions Jalou by Hong Kong–based AMTD, the magazine is now operated through French subsidiary, The Generation Essentials Group. Since 2010, Vanessa Bellugeon has served as editor-in-chief (fashion), other notable previous editors include Andrée Castanié, Georges Jalou, and Marié-Jose Jalou who edited the magazine from the 1980s until 2002 and served as editorial director until 2022.

Based in the 8th arrondissement of Paris, L'Officiel began publication in 1921 as the official publication of the Chambre Syndicale de la Couture Parisienne.

L'Officiel USA, launched in 1976, as the first international edition. As of 2026, there are 21 international editions, including a region-specific edition for the French Alps and Riviera. Eleven of these editions are published by or in co-operation with L'Officiel (L'Officiel Canada, 时装 L'Officiel China, L'Officiel Davos, L'Officiel Hong Kong, L'Officiel Italia, L'Officiel Japan, L'Officiel Malaysia, L'Officiel Philippines, L'Officiel Singapore, 时装 L'Officiel Singapore, L'Officiel USA). The other ten editions are published under licence. A men's edition of the magazine, L'Officiel Hommes, began publication in 1977. L'Officiel Art was in print from 2012 to 2020, and has since transitioned to a digital-only format.

== Background ==
L'Officiel is a French fashion magazine founded in 1921 by Amédée-Martin Brunhes as L'Officiel de la Couture et de la Mode (till late 1921, then as L'Officiel de la Couture, de la Mode et de la Confection till 1923, as L'Officiel de la Couture, de la Mode de Paris till 1935, as L'Officiel de la Couture et de la Mode de Paris till 2020, as L'Officiel since 2020/2021; with the secondary title Official Fashions from 1924 to 1926), it is the oldest fashion magazine of French origin in publication.

The magazine is a bimonthly publication, published seven times per year for February/March, April/May, June/July, September, November, December/January, alongside a special issue for summer.

Founded as the official publication of the Chambre Syndicale de la Couture Parisienne, the magazine's slogan is 'The Official Voice of Fashion' (in French 'la voix officielle de la mode'). L'Officiel was owned by the Brunhes family from 1921 until 1933, Andrée Castanié then owned the publication until her death in 1969, then coming under the control of Georges Jalou and Marcel G. Pérès, the Jalou family wholly acquired the magazine in 1985. In 2022 the family sold the magazine and their publishing house to AMTD. Since 2025, L'Officiel is under the control of AMTD subsidiary The Generation Essentials Group. The magazine is considered an international rival of Vogue and Harper's Bazaar and considered to be the doyenne of French fashion magazines.

=== Circulation ===
Total circulation
Year	2007	2008	2009	2010	2011	2012	2013	2014	2015	2016	2017
Circulation	959,480	947,801	876,681	839,045	882,437	827,584	760,126	782,607	645,556	574,118	645,135

=== Editors ===
French publications usually have multiple editors for different sections of the magazine, in the case of L'Officiel they are listed below. However, since 2021, Vanessa Bellugeon is the only Editor-in-Chief of the publication.

Editor	Start year	End year
Editor-in-Chief
Jacques Sarrazin	1921	
Dominique Gaffory		
Yves-Georges Prade	1924	
Andrée Castanié		1947
Georges Jalou	1947	1986
Marie-José Jalou	1986	2002
Editor-in-Chief (Fashion)
Marie-Anne Faure Lachaud	2002	2010
Vanessa Bellugeon	2010	present
Editor-in-Chief (Magazine)
Cécile Sepulchre	2002	2007
Caroline Bongrand	2007	2010
Daphné Hézard	2010	2014
Frédérique Dedet	2014	2016
Marie-José Jalou	2016	2016
Adrienne Ribes	2016	2021

== History ==
=== The Beginnings of L'Officiel (1921–1938) ===
Cover of the first issue (20 July 1921)

L'Officiel was first published on 20 July 1921, founded by Amédée-Martin Brunhes it was the official publication of the Chambre Syndicale de la Couture. The Chambre Syndicale de la Couture (commonly referred to as "the Chamber") was founded in 1868 by Charles Frederick Worth as a trade body representing all Parisian couturiers. L'Officiel assumed the role of the Chamber's previous official publication, Les Elégances Parisiennes. During this period the magazine was directed principally at international buyers of high fashion, both corporate and individual, and those working within the fashion industry; it was published in French, English, and Spanish. Brunhes stated the magazine was to be a "technical and corporative organ" to overcome the "indolence and incompetence of the Public Powers, who disregard one of the richest sources of national wealth [referring to the couture industry]." Couturiers such as Paul Poiret would have the magazine delivered to their offices for inspiration, later fashion designers including Jean Paul Gaultier would take inspiration from vintage and contemporary issues of the magazine. Interviews with Poiret, Louise Chéruit, and Jean Patou were included within the first and second issues. From the mid-1920s illustrations by Léon Benigni, S. Chompré, and Pierre-Armand Covillot, defined the visual aesthetic of the publication. Benigni would illustrate over a hundred covers for the magazine.

In May 1926, Edouard Max Brunhes (son of Amédée-Martin) was named co-director of the publication. Under his leadership the magazine introduced features on automobiles, art expositions, and news of beauty innovations. In 1928, Edouard Max acquired the publishing company of L'Officiel, Éditions Brunhes. Edouard Max proclaimed that "L'Officiel should be known in the entire world, that it should demonstrate the unequalled quality of French production and creation,".

In 1927, Jean Dunand was the first artist to create a graphically treated cover layout for the magazine. Pierre-Armand Covillot would then become the primary cover layout designer, noted for his style that mirrored the Art Deco movement. In 1928, the photography family Frères Séeberger began photographing features for the magazine. Contributing to the magazine through to the 1940s. From the late 1920s through to the 1930s, Austrian photographer Madame d'Ora worked for the magazine on contract and served as the primary photographer. d'Ora would shoot over eighty covers for the magazine.

In 1932, Georges Jalou was hired as art director and Marcel G. Pérès was hired to improve sales and advertising.

L'Officiel publisher, Edouard Max Brunhes would die in 1933 and his widow entrusted the magazine to his principal collaborator, Andrée Castanié. Castanié began contributing to the magazine from 1928 and catered the publication to the perspective of a high-society Parisian woman. During her time as director she recruited many female editors including Jeanne Stéphane, Elizabeth Arnaud, and Paule Cornille. Also in 1933 the Monte Carlo Rally Ladies Cup was created and sponsored by the magazine. In 1934, L'Officiel advertised within the windows of Macy's department store in New York City. Targeting American fashion designers who could use the publication for inspiration as a repository of French fashion.

In March 1936, the first cover photo in colour was published, featuring a model wearing a dress designed by Robert Piguet. Italian illustrator René Gruau began a long-term collaboration with the magazine in 1936. Over the span of fifty-five years, Gruau would illustrate more than ten covers and countless pages for the magazine. His distinct Japonisme-inspired artwork would define 1950s fashion illustration. His final contribution to L'Officiel was the December 1991/January 1992 cover.

=== World War II and Post-war (1939–1969) ===
Cover of the October/November 1939 issue, "Gazing for peace"

L'Officiel was one of the only fashion magazines to continue publication during the German occupation of France. Other notable publications such as Fémina, Jardin des Modes, and Vogue Paris suspended publication. L'Officiel obtained a license to publish from Nazi authorities in February 1941, it was suspended in May 1941 and again in May 1942. The 1942 suspension was due to an editorial report about fashion shows organised by Lucien Lelong occurring in the Zone libre. Prior to the war multiple features advocating for peace were published by the magazine, including a Léon Benigni-illustrated cover depicting a woman hopefully gazing to the sky. During wartime to the anger of Nazi authorities the magazine frequently published covers featuring the French national colours of blue, white, and red in support of the French Resistance. Art director Georges Jalou would inform authorities that they were "the colours of the season". Editor-in-chief of the publication, Andrée Castanié, was a member of the French Resistance, helping Allied soldiers escape from Nazi forces. President Eisenhower of the United States would personally thank Castanié for her aid.

Colette would work for the magazine from 1941 to 1942 as an editorial writer. She contributed multiple features on style, silhouettes, and the beauties of France. During the 1940s, Bernard Blossac began illustrating for the magazine, continuing to do so until his retirement in 1973.

In 1946, L'Officiel launched Chapeaux de Paris, a sister publication focused on millinery. In 1955 it was renamed Actualité Couture-Chapeaux de Paris due to an increasing focus on French ready-to-wear.

Castanié was replaced by Georges Jalou as editor-in-chief in 1947. Castanié would continue contributing to the magazine until her death in 1969. Under Jalou's leadership the magazine would help to start the careers of designers such as Pierre Balmain, Cristóbal Balenciaga, Christian Dior, and Yves St. Laurent, it became known as "the Bible of fashion and of high society". Post-war, Christian Dior would dub the magazine "the bible of female fashion" as it continued to fulfil the role of showcasing French fashion to professional buyers around the world.

Post-war Philippe Pottier would join the magazine as photographer and fashion editor, contributing to the publication for twenty-five years. Jacques de Lacretelle and Irène Lidova contributed to the magazine during the post-war period.

Mary Brooks Picken wrote in 1956 that L'Officiel was the most popular couture magazine worldwide and the leading publication of French fashion publishing. Throughout the 1960s starlets such as Jane Birkin, Catherine Deneuve, and Sylvie Vartan had their first editorial photoshoots for the magazine.

=== Jalou-Pérès acquisition and period of dual ownership (1969–1984) ===
Following the death of Andrée Castanieé in 1969, Georges Jalou (holding a 25% shareholding from 1967) and Marcel G. Pérès acquired the magazine. Under the ownership of Jalou and Pérès, the magazine began to adopt "the aesthetic and editorial codes of high-end feminine fashion" moving away from the previous style catering to the industry and industry professionals. Entering into the 1970s photographers such as Roland Bianchini and Jean-Louis Guégan defined the visual language of the magazine alongside contributions from creatives such as Jicky Dussart.

An entire issue was dedicated to the creations of Pierre Cardin in 1972. The following year an issue would be dedicated to the rise of ready-to-wear fashion and advancements in the ready-to-wear industry, including the achievements of textile factories and companies such as Bucol, Dormeuil, Armand Hallenstein, and Leonard. From 1973 to 1974 a column titled "Inofficiel" was published in the magazine. Written by Alain Naulin and illustrated by Edmond Kiraz, Inofficiel focused on gossip, women's issues and sexual freedom. It acted as a humorous counterpart to the "official" reporting of L'Officiel on fashion and society. It introduced a wider feminist perspective on the editorial direction of the magazine.

The first editorial photoshoot of Isabelle Adjani was published in the December 1974 issue. At age fifteen she posed wearing only a fur coat and jewellery. French sociologist Bruno Latour contributed a noted essay on patriarchy ("La fin du pouvoir mâle"; transl. The end of male power) for the March 1979 issue.

=== Under Éditions Jalou: International expansion, receivership, and sale to AMTD (1985–2022) ===
Following the death of Marcel Pérès in 1985, Georges Jalou inherited sole ownership of the magazine and created the Éditions Jalou publishing house. The Jalou family began contributing to the magazine in 1932 when Georges Jalou was hired as art director, followed by his wife Urselle Susskind-Jalou (as an illustrator, translator, and later public relations manager), and then their children in the late 1960s. In 1986, Jalou transferred the publishing house to his three children; Laurent Jalou became the president, Marie-José Jalou directed the editorial content, and Maxime Jalou served as art director. Marie-José Jalou began her career as an illustrator for the magazine in 1968, then as an editor from 1976, and couture editor from 1983.

From 1993 to 1996, American photographer Francesco Scavullo was a contributing photographer at the magazine. His photographs of Claudia Schiffer, Karen Mulder, Meghan Douglas, and Shalom Harlow among others were all printed in the magazine.

For the 800th issue/75th anniversary issue in November 1995 prominent writers including Frédéric Dard, Françoise Giroud, Régine Deforges, and Amélie Nothomb, were invited to contribute pieces about fashion history based upon previous issues of the magazine. Previous interviews with Jean Cocteau, Colette, Paul Poiret, Marcel Rochas, and Yves Saint Laurent were reprinted within this issue. Also in 1995 the "Generation X" editorial feature was published, a photo-story by Laurence Benaïm it reported on the fashion and culture of Parisian drag queens. In 1998 the average issue circulation of L'Officiel was 96,578.

Laurent Jalou passed away in 2003 and Marie-José Jalou became president, retiring from her role as editor-in-chief of, she restructured the magazines editorial content to target a younger audience. Michel Mallard Studio was hired to overhaul the art direction of the magazine.

L'Officiel logo (1948–1951; 1961–1973; 2008–2022)

In 2005 the L'Officiel archive was launched online, becoming the first free-access online fashion magazine archive. Gérard Chevalier oversaw the development and the completion of the archive, beginning in 2003.

In 2011, controversy occurred over a cover featuring American singer Beyoncé in blackface and traditional African tribal makeup. The magazine responded stating that the makeup was in honour of Fela Kuti and "a return to her [Beyoncé's] African roots." Jezebel writer Dodai Stewart critisticed the editorial, "It's fun to play with fashion and makeup, and fashion has a history of provocation and pushing boundaries. But when you paint your face darker in order to look more 'African,' aren't you reducing an entire continent, full of different nations, tribes, cultures and histories, into one brown color?" Stylist and creative director of the photoshoot Jenke Ahmed Tailly responded stating "It was paying homage to African queens."

For the October 2013 issue Karl Lagerfeld photographed the cover and an accompanying editorial, featuring the cast of Opium a biographical film about Jean Patou.

In 2015, Éditions Jalou was ordered to pay €4.2 million to Parlant Publishing over the 2010 termination of the license to L'Officiel Russia following the dismissal of editor-in-chief Evelina Khromtchenko. This payment led the publishing house to enter receivership. At the time the company had a revenue of €33 million and printed more than 24 million copies of L'Officiel around the world for 70 million readers.

In 2018, cryptocurrency Taste Token was launched. Led by Benjamin Eymère, then CEO of L'Officiel it was developed to compensate readers for their time on the website and for brands to learn the interests and preferences of readers.

Stefano Tonchi was appointed to the role of Chief Creative Officer in January 2020, exiting the position in December 2021 after payments to freelancers continued to be delayed. In January 2021, freelancers working for the magazine in France took legal action over missing payments.

In September 2021, the magazine celebrated its 100th anniversary with a special issue, featuring Jessica Chastain photographed by Alexi Lubomirski on the cover. A virtual museum known as L'Officiel House of Dreams was launched dedicated to the history of the magazine. The archives were opened for academic study to students at Parsons Paris. Alongside the previous celebrations a book titled L'Officiel 100 : One Hundred People and Ideas from a Century in Fashion was published, edited by Stefano Tonchi, contributors included Emanuele Coccia, Pamela Golbin, Marié-Jose Jalou, and Valerie Steele among others. At the time the magazine was overseen by Marie-José Jalou (Director), Vanessa Bellugeon (Editor-in-chief, fashion), Adrienne Ribes (Editor-in-chief, magazine), Jennifer Eymère (Artistic and casting director), and Benjamin Eymère (CEO). Only Ribes was not a member of the Jalou family.

=== Post-acquisition and contemporary (2022–present) ===
L'Officiel Inc. SAS, Éditions Jalou, and associated companies were sold to AMTD International (subsidiary of Hong Kong-based AMTD Group) in April 2022. The Jalou family contributed to magazine until their 2025 legal case against AMTD, they retain ownership of L'Officiel Riviera in a partnership with Philippe Combres, Combres also owns L'Officiel St. Barth. Following the purchase, AMTD announced intentions to expand and establish the presence of the magazine to new regions around the world.

In 2023, L'Officiel Singapore and L'Officiel Malaysia were brought under direct ownership and management. In August 2023, L'Officiel Philippines was brought under direct ownership. The same year L'Officiel was reorganised to become part of AMTD World Media and Entertainment Group (WME). In 2025 a de-SPAC transaction occurred with a company backed by Lawrence Ho, which saw the creation of a new parent company The Generation Essentials Group (TGE), publicly traded on the New York Stock Exchange. On the IPO day L'Officiel hosted the first fashion show on the NYSE trading floor.

In 2026, the Jalou family accused AMTD of "trademark infringement, tax fraud, and misuse of corporate assets," according to The Times the new owners are "fraudulently running the publication into the ground". AMTD has been accused of running a financial scheme that aims to squander the assets of the French company, profiting from the brand without the French entity receiving any profit. Primarily through foreign subsidiaries registered in the British Virgin Islands and the Cayman Islands. The stripping of assets from the French company is in direct violation of the 2015 recovery plan following Éditions Jalou's bankruptcy that prohibits the sale or transfer of the business and its brands. The photographic archives of L'Officiel are also reported to be missing. The Jalou family has reportedly not received all money from the 2022 sale with proceeds frozen in a Hong Kong bank account owned by the brokerage firm of AMTD. Former CEO, Benjamin Eymère launched legal proceedings against the company for unfair dismissal, seeking whistleblower status (that was denied by the labour court). The Paris police judiciary have opened an investigation into the financial operations of the magazine following a 2025 complaint. Marie-José Jalou said she believed that AMTD was trying to deprive the original French publication of its assets and revenue whilst using its renown to construct an international brand, stating "L’Officiel was the fashion bible. I will never give up on it."

==== L'Officiel Coffee ====
At the World Economic Forum in January 2023, a L'Officiel Coffee pop-up opened in Davos, with intentions to expand worldwide. The first permanent location opened in the Omotesandō district of Tokyo in April 2025. A L'Officiel Bar opened at the Tokyo coffeehouse in October 2025.

In October 2025, a L'Officiel Coffee pop-up occurred at Shreeji Newsagents in London, United Kingdom. The second L'Officiel Coffee branch opened in Macau at the City of Dreams casino and resort in May 2026. A third coffeehouse will open in the Tribeca district of New York City.

Coffeehouses are planned to open across Japan, and in Australia, China, France, Hong Kong, Malaysia, Singapore, the United Kingdom, and the United States.

=== Noteworthy covers ===
- 20 July 1921: First issue, depicting two French nobles on a walk through a forest
- 15 September 1921: First photograph cover, photo by Delphi
- May 1929: Elsa Schiaparelli, first cover featuring a designer
- October 1945: First cover illustrated by Eduardo García Benito
- No.301/302 1947: First cover illustrated by René Grau
- December 1960: Wilhelmina Cooper's first magazine cover
- April 1968: Alexandra Stewart, first actress on the cover
- June 1970: Sandi Collins, first black model on the cover; alongside uncredited French model
- September 1971: Pat Cleveland, first black model solo cover
- February 1974: Jane Birkin, first singer on the cover
- June 1977: Masako Natsume, first Asian woman on the cover
- November 1984: Linda Evangelista's first magazine cover
- December 1990/January 1991: Gianni Versace, first cover featuring a male designer
- February 2003: Raquel Zimmermann, photographed by Nick Knight
- March 2011: Beyoncé, first black singer on the cover
- October 2013: Cast of 'Opium', photo by Karl Lagerfeld
- September 2016: "Gang of Africa" cover featuring eight black models
- October 2019: Cai Xukun, first solo man on the cover
- September 2021: Jessica Chastain, 100th anniversary cover
- September 2023: Emma Corrin, first non-binary person on the cover

== Notable contributors ==
Illustrators

- Léon Benigni
- Benito
- René Gruau
- Pierre Mourgue

Journalists

- Colette
- France Huser
- Catherine Millet

Photographers

- Bohdán Bohdánov
- Éric Guillemain
- Dominique Issermann
- Jean-Daniel Lorieux
- Alexi Lubomirski
- Madame d'Ora
- Harri Peccinotti
- Philippe Pottier
- Francesco Scavullo

== Editions ==
L'Officiel has 21 international editions, including a region-specific edition for the French Alps and Riviera. A men's edition L'Officiel Hommes was first published in 1977 and continuously since 2005. L'Officiel Art was launched in 2012 and then as a themed issue of L'Officiel from 2021 to 2023, it now operates as a digital-only publication.

Cover of the L'Industrie Française du Vêtement Féminine supplement (September 1929)

Spin-off titles of the magazine that are no longer published include L'Officiel 1000 Modèles/L'Officiel Accessories (1996–2019), L'Officiel Chirugie Esthétique (1996–2019), L'Officiel 1000 Modèles Design (2003–2018), L'Officiel Voyage (2005–2019), L'Officiel Business (2007), L'Officiel Intérieur (2008), L'Officiel l'Intégrale 5000 Modèles/L'Officiel Fashion Week (2011–2019), L'Officiel New Talents (2012), L'Officiel l'Intégrale Luxe (2012–2015), L'Officiel Shopping/L'Officiel Paris Guide (launched in 2012), and L'Officiel Beauté (2013).

The magazine's first supplement was launched in the 1920s and was known as L'Industrie Française du Vêtement Féminine. Foreign editions in Brazil, Italy and the Middle East all had original print runs in the 1970s, these editions were closed down but later relaunched. From 1984 to c. 1990, ياسمين Yasmine L'Officiel was published from Paris. The magazine was published in Arabic by Al Mostakbal and distributed across Europe and the Middle East. The editorial team was staffed primarily by Lebanese journalists, who were escaping the Lebanese Civil War. Kamal Sinno served as editor and Ismat Shanbour as art director. Shanbour revolutionised the art direction of Arabic-language magazines and notably redesigned Al Hawadeth. L'Officiel En Español was briefly published from Buenos Aires, Argentina, it began publication in 1980 under the direction of María Eugenia Eyras.

Mens edition of L'Officiel, L'Officiel Hommes launched in 1977. At the time L'Officiel Hommes featured more diverse coverage of age, nationality, and occupations than L'Officiel. The magazine ceased publication in 1991, relaunching in 1996 as L'Officiel Homme. Following a publishing rights dispute L'Officiel Homme rebranded to L'Optimum in 1998. In 2005 the magazine relaunched and has remained in operation since.

As of 2026, L'Officiel directly owns and operates eleven editions L'Officiel Canada, 时装 L'Officiel China (in co-operation with Fashion Publishing), L'Officiel Hong Kong, L'Officiel Italia, L'Officiel Japan, L'Officiel Malaysia, L'Officiel Paris, L'Officiel Philippines, L'Officiel Singapore 时装 L'Officiel Singapore, and L'Officiel USA. A special edition for the World Economic Forum titled L'Officiel Davos has been published since 2023. A Taiwanese edition is set to launch and editions in Australia and Mexico are planned to relaunch in the near future. The magazine also owns and operates La Revue des Montres in France, Malaysia, the Philippines and Singapore. La Revue des Montres is planned to be launched in Vietnam and Japan.

Before the closure of each respective edition they owned and operated L'Officel Brasil (joint-venture with Editora Escala), L'Officiel NL (the Netherlands), and L'Officiel Schweiz/Suisse (Switzerland).

=== 时装 L'Officiel China ===
L'Officiel was the first international fashion magazine to launch in China, launching in April 1987, however this edition ceased publication in 1990.

The magazine was relaunched in 2002 as 魅力 L'Officiel 中文版 and was operated by NCN (Hong Kong branch) under licence, the magazine was based in Hong Kong. However it closed the same year.

In 1980 时装 (Fashion) was founded and by the mid-1980s had almost reached a circulation of 300,000. From late 2003 the magazine was rebranded to 时装 L'Officiel after an agreement was made with Éditions Jalou and with this the magazine became distributed in mainland China, Hong Kong and Macau. The magazine is based in Beijing. As of 2021 L'Officiel China had a circulation of 839,000.

=== L'Officiel Hong Kong ===
L'Officiel entered the Hong Kong market in 2002 with the launch of 魅力 L'Officiel, the Chinese edition of L'Officiel. 魅力 L'Officiel was based out of Hong Kong, however, it would cease publication within the year. 时装 L'Officiel China was distributed in Hong Kong from its launch in 2003.

The Hong Kong edition of L'Officiel, entitled L'Officiel Hong Kong SAR launched on digital platforms in November 2023 and entered print in March 2024. Katherine Ho (previously of Vogue Hong Kong) was appointed editor-in-chief. After four issues in-print, the vast majority of the editorial staff were laid off. Following that, the company underwent a restructuring. Angel Fong was appointed editor-in-chief in 2025.

In 2026, the magazine alongside The Art Newspaper Hong Kong was designated as a media partner for the "Art in Resonance" programme of The Peninsula Hong Kong.

=== L'Officiel Italia ===
L'Officiel Italia was published for a brief period in the 1970s and agin in the 1990s. In 2009, the Italian edition L'Officiel Hommes was launched and in September 2012 L'Officiel Italia was relaunched with Carlo Mazzoni as Editor-in-Chief.

=== L'Officiel Japan ===
In 1973, Japanese translations were included in the original French edition. In 2005 the Japanese edition L'Officiel Japon was launched. It ceased publication in 2008. In October 2015 L'Officiel Japan re-launched with Tetsuya Mabuchi as publisher and Naoko Kikuchi as editor-in-chief it was published in a co-operation between Éditions Jalou and Seven & I Publishing. The magazine ceased publication in December 2016, but the last issue was January/February 2017.

In early 2020 it was reported that within two years a Japanese edition was aiming to be launched along with editions for Australia, Nigeria and the United Kingdom. The same was confirmed about a Japanese edition in late 2022.

WWD Japan reported in May 2024 that the magazine would relaunch in September with Takafumi Kawasaki as its Editor-in-Chief, he previously worked for L'Uomo Vogue and GQ Japan. The magazine relaunched in September with Rie Miyazawa on the cover.

=== L'Officiel USA ===
L'Officiel USA (stylised as L'Officiel/U.S.A.) was launched in 1976 as one of the first international editions of the magazine, The magazine was edited by Dorothy Coleman Seeman, however, in 1979 she was replaced by Himilce Novas whom had been called "terrific" by Diana Vreeland. Prior to the 1976 launch of L'Officiel/U.S.A., an imported version of Parisian L'Officiel with accompanying English translations was printed for the United States from April 1946. Prior to this the magazine was imported to the country from 1928. L'Officiel/U.S.A. ceased publication with the August 1980 issue.

In 2017, L'Officiel USA re-launched on digital platforms led by Joseph Akel, the first print edition was released in February 2018. The magazine is based in New York City. Peter Davis, replaced Akel as editor-in-chief in 2019. Davis would exit the magazine at the end of 2020.

After the role of editor was left vacant for nearly two years, Caroline Grosso was appointed editor-in-chief of L'Officiel USA in August 2022.

== Foreign editions and editors ==
=== Operating ===
Country/region	Circulation dates	Editor-in-chief	Start year	End year
United States (L'Officiel USA)	1976–1980	Dorothy Coleman Seeman	1976	1979
United States (L'Officiel USA)	1976–1980	Himilce Novas	1979	1980
United States (L'Officiel USA)	2018–present	Joseph Akel	2018	2019
United States (L'Officiel USA)	2018–present	Peter Davis	2019	2020
United States (L'Officiel USA)	2018–present	Caroline Grosso	2022	present
China (时装 L'Officiel China)	1987–1990 (Note: As 巴黎时装 L'Officiel)	Hong Min (洪敏)	1987	1990
China (时装 L'Officiel China)	2002–2002 (Note: As 魅力 L'Officiel 中文版)	Liu Yuewei (劉閱微)	2002	2002
China (时装 L'Officiel China)	2003–present	Cheng Min (程敏)	2003	
China (时装 L'Officiel China)	2003–present	Zhang Jing (张晶)	2017	present
Italy (L'Officiel Italia)	1991–1992	Giancarlo Albano	1991	1992
Italy (L'Officiel Italia)	2012–present	Carlo Mazzoni	2012	2014
Italy (L'Officiel Italia)	2012–present	Gianluca Cantaro	2014	2019
Italy (L'Officiel Italia)	2012–present	Giampietro Baudo	2019	present
Turkey (L'Officiel Türkiye)	2000–2005	Işık Şimşek	2000	2001
Turkey (L'Officiel Türkiye)	2012–present	Gülen Yelmen	2013	2015
Turkey (L'Officiel Türkiye)	2012–present	Debora Zakuto	2016	2020
Turkey (L'Officiel Türkiye)	2012–present	Ceyda Gedikoglu	2020	2021
Turkey (L'Officiel Türkiye)	2012–present	Inan Kirdemir	2021	2025
Turkey (L'Officiel Türkiye)	2012–present	Atakan Nisir	2026	2026
Turkey (L'Officiel Türkiye)	2012–present	Derya Gürsel	2026	present
South Korea (L'Officiel Korea)	2001–2002			
South Korea (L'Officiel Korea)	2019–present	Woo Lee Kyung (우이경)	2019	present
Japan (L'Officiel Japan)	2005–2008 (Note: Titled L'Officiel Japon)	Ikuro Takano (高野育郎)	2005	2008
Japan (L'Officiel Japan)	2015–2017	Naoko Kikuchi	2015	2017
Japan (L'Officiel Japan)	2024–present	Takafumi Kawasaki (川崎剛)	2024	present
Singapore (L'Officiel Singapore)	2007–present	Jumius Wong	2013	2015
Singapore (L'Officiel Singapore)	2007–present	Grace Tay	2016	2017
Singapore (L'Officiel Singapore)	2007–present	Ian Lee	2017	present
Belgium (L'Officiel Belgium)	2008–2010 (Note: Titled L'Officiel BE)	Nicolette Goldsmann	2008	2010
Belgium (L'Officiel Belgium)	2019–present (Note: Originally titled L'Officiel BE (2019 to 2022) since 2022 as L'Officiel Belgium or L'Officiel Belgique or L'Officiel België depending on language distributed)	Laurence Descamps	2019	2020
Belgium (L'Officiel Belgium)	2019–present	Céline Pécheux	2020	present
Thailand (L'Officiel Thailand)	2012–present	Kusuma Chayiaporn	2012	
Thailand (L'Officiel Thailand)	2012–present	Sethapong Pawwattana	2019	2025
Thailand (L'Officiel Thailand)	2012–present	Daneenart Burkakasikorn	2025	present
Philippines (L'Officiel Philippines)	2015–2017 (Note: Titled L'Officiel Manila)	Pam Quiñones	2015	2017
Philippines (L'Officiel Philippines)	2021–present	Danyl Geneciran	2021	2023
Philippines (L'Officiel Philippines)	2021–present	Loris Peña	2024	present
Vietnam (L'Officiel Vietnam)	2015–present	Angie Nguyễn	2015	2016
Vietnam (L'Officiel Vietnam)	2015–present	Dzũng Yoko	2016	2017
Vietnam (L'Officiel Vietnam)	2015–present	Valerie Mai Lan	2017	2020
Vietnam (L'Officiel Vietnam)	2015–present	Ho Hai Yen	2021	2025
Vietnam (L'Officiel Vietnam)	2015–present	Lan Khuê	2025	present
Malaysia (L'Officiel Malaysia)	2015–present	Monica Mong	2015	2021
Malaysia (L'Officiel Malaysia)	2015–present	Ian Loh	2021	2022
Malaysia (L'Officiel Malaysia)	2015–present	John Ng	2022	present
Saint Barth (L'Officiel St. Barth)	2015–present	Philippe Combres	2015	2023
Saint Barth (L'Officiel St. Barth)	2015–present	Jenny Mannerheim	2024	present
Argentina (L'Officiel Argentina)	2018–present (Note: Originally titled L'Officiel ARG (2018 to 2020) since 2020 as L'Officiel Argentina)	Ana Torrejón	2018	present
Monaco (L'Officiel Monaco)	2020–present	Christoph Steiner	2020	2021
Monaco (L'Officiel Monaco)	2020–present	Michael Schwab	2021	2021
Monaco (L'Officiel Monaco)	2020–present	Svitlana Lavrynovych	2022	2022
Monaco (L'Officiel Monaco)	2020–present	Anna Znamesky	2022	2022
Monaco (L'Officiel Monaco)	2020–present	Daria Romanenko	2023	2024
Monaco (L'Officiel Monaco)	2020–present	Katerina Leroy	2024	present
Chile (L'Officiel Chile)	2021–present	Valentina Espinoza	2021	2022
Chile (L'Officiel Chile)	2021–present	Paula Olmedo	2022	present
French Riviera, French Alps (L'Officiel Riviera)	2021–present	Philippe Combres	2021	2023
French Riviera, French Alps (L'Officiel Riviera)	2021–present	Jenny Mannerheim	2024	2025
French Riviera, French Alps (L'Officiel Riviera)	2021–present	Edouard Ng	2025	present
Ibiza (L'Officiel Ibiza)	2022–present	Maya Boyd	2022	2024
Ibiza (L'Officiel Ibiza)	2022–present	Maria Cecilia Andretta	2026	present
Hong Kong (L'Officiel Hong Kong SAR)	2024–present	Katherine Ho	2024	2024
Hong Kong (L'Officiel Hong Kong SAR)	2024–present	Angel Fong	2025	present
Canada (L'Officiel Canada)	2026–present			
Singapore (L'Officiel Singapore 时装)	2026–present	Grace Lee	2026	present

=== Defunct ===
Country/region	Circulation dates	Editor-in-chief	Start year	End year
Brazil (L'Officiel Brasil)	1978–1981	Celina Luz		1981
Brazil (L'Officiel Brasil)	2006–2025	Silvana Holzmeister	2006	2011
Brazil (L'Officiel Brasil)	2006–2025	Erika Palomino	2012	2015
Brazil (L'Officiel Brasil)	2006–2025	Maria Rita Alonso	2015	2018
Brazil (L'Officiel Brasil)	2006–2025	Renata Brosina	2018	2020
Brazil (L'Officiel Brasil)	2006–2025	Patrícia Favalle	2020	2020
Brazil (L'Officiel Brasil)	2006–2025	Silvana Holzmeister	2021	2025
Spain (L'Officiel España)	1992–1992		1992	1992
Spain (L'Officiel España)	2015–2018	Andrés Rodriguez	2015	2018
Russia (L'Officiel Россия)	1997–2011	Alexander Pushkin (Александр Пушкин)	1997	1998
Russia (L'Officiel Россия)	1997–2011	Evelina Khromtchenko (Эвелина Хромченко)	1998	2011
Russia (L'Officiel Россия)	1997–2011	Maria Nevskaya (Мария Невская)	2010	2011
Russia (L'Officiel Россия)	2013–2018	Ksenia Gorbacheva (Ксения Горбачева)	2013	2014
Russia (L'Officiel Россия)	2013–2018	Ksenia Sobchak (Ксения Собчак)	2015	2018
Russia (L'Officiel Россия)	2019–2022	Edward Dorozhkin (Эдуард Дорожкин)	2019	2020
Russia (L'Officiel Россия)	2019–2022	Ekaterina Astashova (Екатерина Асташова)	2020	2022
Greece (L'Officiel Hellas)	2000–2003	Anita Grigoriadis	2000	2003
Greece (L'Officiel Hellas)	2006–2012	Evi Karatza	2006	2009
Greece (L'Officiel Hellas)	2014–2015	Maria Chorianopoulou	2014	2015
Ukraine (L'Officiel Україна)	2001–2025	Iryna Danylevska (Ірина Данилевська)	2001	2004
Ukraine (L'Officiel Україна)	2001–2025	Natalia Radovynska	2004	2008
Ukraine (L'Officiel Україна)	2001–2025	Ana Varava (Ане Вараве)	2008	2017
Ukraine (L'Officiel Україна)	2001–2025	Ulyana Boyko (Ульяна Бойко)	2017	2025
Ukraine (L'Officiel Україна)	2001–2025	Alexey Nilov (Олексій Нілов)	2024	2025
India (L'Officiel India)	2002–2022	Superna R. Motwane	2002	2013
India (L'Officiel India)	2002–2022	Juhi Dua Jacob	2013	2015
India (L'Officiel India)	2002–2022	Asmita Aggarwal	2015	2016
India (L'Officiel India)	2002–2022	Neena Haridas	2016	2018
India (L'Officiel India)	2002–2022	Nitin Agarwal	2020	2022
Bahrain, Kuwait, Oman, Qatar, Saudi Arabia, United Arab Emirates (L'Officiel Arabia)	2005–2018 (Note: Titled L'Officiel Middle East)	Souha Abbas	2005	c. 2008
Bahrain, Kuwait, Oman, Qatar, Saudi Arabia, United Arab Emirates (L'Officiel Arabia)	2005–2018	Mirvat Ghanem	c. 2008	2009
Bahrain, Kuwait, Oman, Qatar, Saudi Arabia, United Arab Emirates (L'Officiel Arabia)	2005–2018	Nadine El Chaer	2010	
Bahrain, Kuwait, Oman, Qatar, Saudi Arabia, United Arab Emirates (L'Officiel Arabia)	2019–2021	Boba Stanic	2019	2021
The Netherlands (L'Officiel NL)	2007–2019	Annemiecke Hart	2007	2008
The Netherlands (L'Officiel NL)	2007–2019	Nicolette Goldsmann	2008	2019
Serbia (L'Officiel Srbija)	2008–2010	Verica Rakočević	2008	2008
Serbia (L'Officiel Srbija)	2008–2010	Peter Janosevic	2008	2009
Serbia (L'Officiel Srbija)	2008–2010	Bojana Janjušević		2010
Latvia (L'Officiel Latvija)	2008–2025	Marina Siunova	2008	
Latvia (L'Officiel Latvija)	2008–2025	Jelena Vlasova		
Latvia (L'Officiel Latvija)	2008–2025	Julija Rumjanceva	2014	2017
Latvia (L'Officiel Latvija)	2008–2025	Līga Zemture	2018	2024
Latvia (L'Officiel Latvija)	2008–2025	Gabriela Golande	2025	2025
Morocco (L'Officiel Maroc)	2009–2025	Sofia Benbrahim	2009	2015
Morocco (L'Officiel Maroc)	2009–2025	Kaoutar Salmy	2015	2016
Morocco (L'Officiel Maroc)	2009–2025	Hugues Roy	2017	2025
Lebanon, Syria (L'Officiel Levant)	2009–2019	Fifi Abou Dib	2009	2019
Kazakhstan, Kyrgyzstan, Tajikistan, Turkmenistan, Uzbekistan (L'Officiel Central Asia)	2010–2014	Gulnara Karimova	2010	2014
Lithuania (L'Officiel Lithuania)	2010–2023	Jurgita Garbaraviciene	2010	2018
Lithuania (L'Officiel Lithuania)	2010–2023	Agnė Jagelavičiūtė	2018	2021
Lithuania (L'Officiel Lithuania)	2010–2023	Juoz Statkevičius	2021	2022
Azerbaijan (L'Officiel Azerbaijan)	2012–2018	Nilufer Amini Afhami (Нилюфер Амини Афхами)	2012	2013
Azerbaijan (L'Officiel Azerbaijan)	2012–2018	Lina Aliyeva (Лина Алиева)	2016	2018
Indonesia (L'Officiel Indonesia)	2013–2019	Winda Malika Siregar	2013	2014
Indonesia (L'Officiel Indonesia)	2013–2019	Hessy Aurelia Rumadja	2014	2017
Indonesia (L'Officiel Indonesia)	2013–2019	Rizky Citra Rory (Note: Originally credited as Kiky Rory)	2018	2019
Switzerland (L'Officiel Suisse/Schweiz)	2014–2019	Sandra Bauknecht	2014	2016
Switzerland (L'Officiel Suisse/Schweiz)	2014–2019	Livia Zafiriou	2016	2019
Switzerland (L'Officiel Suisse/Schweiz)	2014–2019	Odile Didi Habel	2019	2019
Mexico (L'Officiel México)	2014–2022	Pamela Ocampo	2014	2018
Mexico (L'Officiel México)	2014–2022	Brenda Díaz de la Vega	2019	2019
Mexico (L'Officiel México)	2014–2022	Javier Quesada	2019	2022
Australia (L'Officiel Australia)	2015–2015	Dimitri Vorontsov	2015	2015
Australia (L'Officiel Australia)	2015–2015	Damien Woolnough	2015	2015
Kazakhstan (L'Officiel Kazakhstan)	2015–2019	Gulnara Mergaliyeva		
Germany (L'Officiel Deutsch)	2016–2018	Lisa Feldmann	2016	2017
Germany (L'Officiel Deutsch)	2016–2018	Nikolas Marten	2017	2018
Mykonos (L'Officiel Mykonos)	2016–2016	Molly Andrianou (Μόλλυ Αδριανού)	2016	2016
Mykonos (L'Officiel Mykonos)	2016–2016	Eleni Papaioannou	2016	2016
Poland (L'Officiel Polska)	2016–2021	Ewelina Kustra	2016	2021
Estonia, Latvia, Lithuania (L'Officiel Baltic)	2018–2025	Līga Zemture	2018	2024
Estonia, Latvia, Lithuania (L'Officiel Baltic)	2018–2025	Gabriela Golande	2025	2025
Austria (L'Officiel Austria)	2019–2025	Christoph Steiner	2019	2022
Austria (L'Officiel Austria)	2019–2025	Svitlana Lavrynovych	2022	2022
Austria (L'Officiel Austria)	2019–2025	Anna Znamensky	2022	2024
Austria (L'Officiel Austria)	2019–2025	Sara Douedari	2024	2025
Cyprus (L'Officiel Cyprus)	2020–2024	Christoph Steiner	2020	2021
Cyprus (L'Officiel Cyprus)	2020–2024	Svitlana Lavrynovych	2021	2022
Cyprus (L'Officiel Cyprus)	2020–2024	Anna Znamesky	2022	2023
Cyprus (L'Officiel Cyprus)	2020–2024	Andrea Ioannou	2023	2023
Cyprus (L'Officiel Cyprus)	2020–2024	Lisa Johnson	2023	2024
Liechtenstein (L'Officiel Liechtenstein)	2021–2025	Grace Maier	2021	2025

== Books ==
- L'Officiel Bêtes de Mode (Éditions Ipanema/Éditions Jalou, 2011; edited by Patrick Cabasset)
- L'Officiel Bling! (Éditions Ipanema/Éditions Jalou, 2011; edited by Patrick Cabasset)
- L'Officiel Fantasmes Couture (Éditions Ipanema/Éditions Jalou, 2011; edited by Patrick Cabasset)
- L'Officiel It Girl! (Éditions Ipanema/Éditions Jalou, 2011; edited by Patrick Cabasset)
- L'Officiel Look at Me! (Éditions Ipanema/Éditions Jalou, 2011; edited by Patrick Cabasset)
- L'Officiel Mode et Excès (Éditions Ipanema/Éditions Jalou, 2011; edited by Patrick Cabasset)
- L'Officiel Oui je le veux! (Éditions Ipanema/Éditions Jalou, 2011; edited by Patrick Cabasset)
- L'Officiel Splash! (Les Éditions Ipanema, 2011; edited by Patrick Cabasset)
- L'Officiel 100 : One Hundred People and Ideas from a Century in Fashion (Marsilio Editori, 2021; edited by Stefano Tonchi)

== See also ==
- List of L'Officiel cover models
- L'Officiel Hommes
