= L'Officiel Russia =

Russian fashion magazine

- Cover of the August 1997 issue, Esther de Jong by Michel Nafziger
- Categories: Fashion
- First issue: August 1997; 29 years ago
- Final issue: Spring 2022
- Company: Parlant Publishing (1997–2010); Premiera Media (2010–2011); Éditions Jalou Russia (2013–2015); ACMG (2015–2022)
- Country: Russia
- Based in: Moscow
- Language: Russian
- ISSN: 2309-2858

L'Officiel Russia (Russian: L'Officiel Россия; stylised in all caps), was a Russian monthly fashion magazine that covered haute couture, ready-to-wear fashion, beauty, culture, and design.

Under the control of Parlant Publishing from 1997 to 2010, briefly published by Premiera Media and then Éditions Jalou Russia, ACMG acquired the title in 2015 and continued publication until closure in 2022. Evelina Khromtchenko served as the editor from 1998 to 2011 and Ksenia Sobchak from 2015 to 2018.

== Background ==
L'Officiel Russia was the Russian edition of French fashion magazine L'Officiel. At the time of launch in August 1997 it was the second foreign high fashion magazine to enter the Russian market, following the launch of Harper's Bazaar in March 1996.

From 1997 to 2010 it was published under licence by Parlant Publishing, then Premiera Media from 2010 to 2011, Éditions Jalou Russia from 2013 to 2015, and ACMG from 2015 to 2022.

=== Editors ===
| Editor | Start year | End year | Ref. |
Original (1997–2011)
| Alexander Pushkin (Александр Пушкин) | 1997 | 1998 | |
| Evelina Khromtchenko (Эвелина Хромченко) | 1998 | 2011 | |
| Maria Nevskaya (Мария Невская) | 2010 | 2011 | |
Revival (2013–2018)
| Ksenia Gorbacheva (Ксения Горбачева) | 2013 | 2014 | |
| Ksenia Sobchak (Ксения Собчак) | 2015 | 2018 | |
Second revival (2019–2022)
| Edward Dorozhkin (Эдуард Дорожкин) | 2019 | 2020 | |
| Ekaterina Astashova (Екатерина Асташова) | 2020 | 2022 | |

=== Editions ===
- L'Officiel Hommes Russia
- L'Officiel Voyage Russia (2016 to 2020)

== History ==
L'Officiel Russia began publication in August 1997 under a licensing agreement with Parlant Publishing. On the cover of the premiere issue was Dutch model Esther de Jong, photographed by Michel Nafziger. Originally scheduled to release in July, the release was delayed to August. 60,000 copies of the magazine were distributed across Russia, Belarus, Kazakhstan Latvia, Lithuania, and Moldova. It was also distributed free to business and first class Aeroflot passengers. The first issue featured fashion collections a season ahead of other Russian magazines and was received editorial news from Paris using the internet (a first at the time).

Evelina Khromtchenko was appointed editor-in-chief in 1998, replacing Alexander Pushkin. Khromtchenko would go on to bring international attention to the Russian fashion industry. In 2000, the magazine would move to a monthly publishing schedule.

In 2010, publisher Evgeny Zmievets fired Khromtchenko and his wife Maria Nevskaya replaced her as editor-in-chief. The dismissal of Khromtchenko caused a scandal in the Russian fashion industry and Éditions Jalou would terminate the licensing agreement with Parlant. Éditions Jalou would sign a licensing agreement with Premiera Media and restored Khromtchenko to the position of editor-in-chief. Parlant would ignore the change and continued to publish the magazine. For a brief period both versions appeared on Russian newsstands, ceasing publication in April 2011. In 2015, Éditions Jalou was ordered to pay €4.2 million to Parlant over the 2010 contract termination. This payment led the publishing house to enter receivership.

In October 2013, the publication relaunched. Ksenia Gorbacheva (granddaughter of Mikhail Gorbachev) was appointed editor-in-chief. Gorbacheva, graduated from MGIMO and previously contributed to Russian Grazia. On the cover of the first issue relaunch issue was Canadian model Coco Rocha. The magazine was now published by a newly established Russian division of Éditions Jalou. Vladimir Pomukchinsky served as the main shareholder of Éditions Jalou Russia and Russian editions of L'Officiel Art and L'Officiel Hommes were set to launch.

Artcom Media Group (ACMG), owned by Alexander Fedotov, purchased Pomukchinsky's 80% shareholding in 2014. In 2015, Fedotov purchased the operations of Éditions Jalou in Russia and Germany, leaving Éditions Jalou with a 10% shareholding in the company. Ksenia Sobchak was appointed to the role of editor-in-chief, filling the position left vacant by Gorbacheva. After the launch-party for the first issue of her tenure in March, Sobchak briefly fled the country following the Assassination of Boris Nemtsov.

In 2018, Alexander Fedotov lost the right to publish the magazine following a legal dispute of the 2014 sale by Pomukchinsky. Fedotov would then re-acquire the right to publish the magazine.

The magazine was relaunched in August 2019, Edward Dorozhkin was appointed editor-in-chief. Dorozkhin previously served as editor-in-chief of Russian Tatler. ACMG continued to publish the magazine. Dorozkhin was replaced by Ekaterina Astashova in early 2020.

Ekaterina Astashova would exit the publication in 2022. In 2022, L'Officiel disassociated with the Russian publication. This was most likely due to the Russian invasion of Ukraine. However, the magazine has continued publication sporadically and is now operated as L'Officiel Офисьель Моде (Officiel Mode, a play on L'Officiel de la mode), though no-longer associated with the French magazine.

== See also ==
- L'Officiel, Original French edition in publication since 1921
