= AMTD =

AMTD may refer to:

- AMTD Digital, a Hong Kong–based financial technology firm
- Amplified mycobacterium tuberculosis direct test, a test for Tuberculous meningitis
