= Ransom Everglades School =

Prep school in Coconut Grove, Florida, US

Coordinates: 25.7231565°N 80.244772°W

Location
- 3575 Main Highway; Coconut Grove, Florida 33133

Information
- Type: Private, Independent
- Motto: Honor and Excellence
- Founded: 1903
- Founder: Paul C. Ransom & Marie B. Swenson.
- Head of school: Rachel Rodriguez (Interim)
- Faculty: 242
- Teaching staff: 146
- Employees: 67
- Grades: 6-12
- Gender: Co-educational
- Age range: 10-19
- Enrollment: 1239 students (2026-27)
- Average class size: 14
- Student to teacher ratio: 9:1
- Campuses: Ransom Campus (Upper School), Everglades Campus (Middle School)
- Campus type: Suburban
- Colors: Hunter green and Carolina blue
- Athletics: Football, Sailing, Crew, Water Polo, Swimming, Cross Country, Track & Field, Lacrosse, Tennis, Baseball, Softball, Wrestling, Basketball, Volleyball, Golf, Soccer,
- Team name: Raiders
- Rival: Gulliver Preparatory School
- Accreditation: SAIS/SACS
- Publication: The Dell & Cannon, Inklings, Little Inklings, PEEL, Finance Forward
- Newspaper: The Catalyst
- Tuition: $57,300 (2026–27)
- Website: ransomeverglades.org

Ransom Everglades Upper School's Harry H. Anderson Gymnasium

Ransom Everglades School is an independent, non-profit, co-educational, college-preparatory day school serving grades six to twelve in Coconut Grove in Miami, Florida, United States. It was formed with the merger in 1974 of the Everglades School for Girls and the Ransom School for Boys.

The school is a member of the National Association of Independent Schools, the College Entrance Examination Board, the Global Online Academy, and the Mastery Transcript Consortium, among other educational organizations.

== History ==
Paul C. Ransom, an educator and New York lawyer, opened Pine Knot Camp in 1896 as a school for boys in Coconut Grove. In 1902 Ransom constructed a campus in the Adirondacks of New York to create the Adirondack-Florida School, a boarding school in which students alternated between the Florida and New York campuses during the academic year. The school suspended operations during World War II; after the war the school reopened in 1947. In 1949 the Adirondack campus was shut down and the school continued in Coconut Grove as the Ransom School for Boys. The Ransom School for Boys changed from a boarding to a day school in 1972; Its counterpart, the Everglades School for Girls, began in 1955 founded by Marie B. Swenson. The schools merged and adopted the current name in 1974.

Ransom Everglades has partnerships with organizations such as Breakthrough Miami, St. Alban's Child Enrichment Center, Booker T. Washington High School, ARC of South Florida, MUVE and the Reclamation Project. After an earthquake struck Haiti in January 2010, students at Ransom Everglades raised almost $30,000 in relief funds.

== Campuses ==
The school occupies two campuses. The "Upper School" (Ransom Campus) serves grades nine through twelve and is located on Main Highway on the shore of Biscayne Bay, the site of the original Pine Knot Camp. Parks and Munroe describe the school as the oldest in South Florida still operating on its original site. The original site of the Everglades School for Girls is now the Middle School campus (Everglades Campus), serving grades six through eight and located on South Bayshore Drive, about one and a half miles from the Upper School.

Three early twentieth century buildings still stand on the Ransom campus. The pagoda was built in 1902. Once the whole school, the building serves as the Head of School's office, an event and study space, and faculty offices. In 1973, it was listed in the National Register of Historic Places. Like the Pagoda, the "Ransom Cottage" is on the National Register of Historic Places. Built in 1906, the cottage has been used as the infirmary, the Headmaster's residence, and the band room. Restored in 1998, now the cottage is a conference room and meeting space. In June 2016, Ransom Everglades acquired the La Brisa property adjacent to the Ransom Campus. The 6.9-acre campus includes a restored 1920s home that sits 23 feet above sea level. Then-head of school Penny Townsend stated that the purchase would allow the school to improve its facilities and add additional green space on the waterfront property.

== Athletics ==
The school has an athletic program with over 70 teams among 18 interscholastic sports. Ransom Everglades has fielded state championship teams in water polo (2014, 2015, 2016, 2019), soccer (2015, 2016), tennis (2014, 2018), and volleyball (2013).

== Notable alumni ==
- Butch Brickell, racing driver and stuntman
- Aileen Cannon, federal judge of the U.S. District Court for the Southern District of Florida
- Chris Cavanaugh, swimmer
- Marc Fein, sports broadcaster
- Rachel Feinstein, artist
- Pamela Golbin, curator, author and fashion historian
- Timothy Greenfield-Sanders, documentary filmmaker and portrait photographer
- Lillian Guerra, historian and academic
- Ashleigh Johnson, water polo player
- Jeff Lindsay, writer and playwright
- Phil Lord, filmmaker, animator, and writer
- Mike Malinin, drummer for the Goo Goo Dolls
- Robert Malval, Prime Minister of Haiti
- Jeanine Mason, actress and dancer
- Andres Pedroso, tennis player and coach
- Jay Pierrepont Moffat, diplomat, historian and statesman
- Dan Otero, baseball player
- Arlene Sierra, composer
- Sam Singer, basketball player
- Laurinda Hope Spear, architect and landscape architect
- Devi Sridhar, public health researcher and academic
- Jordi Vilasuso, actor
- Carlos Watson, television host and education advocate
- Sloan Wilson, writer
