= Andrée Castanié =

French journalist (d. 1969)

Marie-Andrée Castanié (d. 7 April 1969) was a French journalist, noted for her position and contributions to the French fashion industry as director of L'Officiel.

Castanié was born in Aveyron. She began working at L'Officiel de la couture et de la mode de Paris on 28 February 1928. Following the death of L'Officiel publisher Edouard Max Brunhes in 1933, his widow entrusted the magazine to Castanié. During World War II, Castanié led the magazine through Nazi administration and was a member of the French Resistance, helping Allied soldiers to escape from Nazi forces. She would be personally thanked by President Eisenhower for her aid. In 1947, Georges Jalou was appointed editor-in-chief of L'Officiel, Castanié would continue to contribute to the magazine until her death on 7 April 1969. In 1953, she was awarded a medal by the Chambre Syndicale de la Haute Couture for her contributions to French fashion, notably alongside Hélène Gordon-Lazareff and Michel de Brunhoff. In later life she served as a Conseiller du commerce extérieur de la France.

== Awards and decorations ==
- Knight of the Légion d'honneur (1962, France)
- Knight of the Ordre de l'Économie nationale (France)
- Knight of the Orden al Mérito por Servicios Distinguidos (Peru)
- Knight of the National Order of the Cedar (Lebanon)

== See also ==
- Marie-José Jalou
