= Teona Gardapkhadze =

Georgian fashion designer

Teona Gardapkhadze თეო გარდაფხაძე
- Born: 17 August 1983 (age 43); Tbilisi, Georgia
- Education: Tbilisi State Academy of Arts
- Label: TEYÓ

Teona Gardapkhadze (Georgian: თეო გარდაფხაძე) known as TEYÓ is a Georgian fashion designer based in Tbilisi, Georgia.

== Early life and education ==
Teona was born in 1983. She graduated an Architecture department of Tbilisi State Academy of Arts. In 2006 she decided to try herself in fashion design. Inspiration + Tendency + Love is a formula of Teona's brand TEYÓ, which was created in 2012. Same year she presented her first f/w collection at Tbilisi Fashion Week. After her debut she successfully works for several stores in Azerbaijan, Kazakhstan and Russia, as well as in Georgia.

== Career ==
Her clothes are chosen by many celebrities, including Sheikha Mozah; Ukrainian singer, actress, songwriter, winner of the Eurovision Song Contest 2016 - Jamala; singer and the current vocalist for the group A-Studio - Keti Topuria; Russian journalist Evelina Khromtchenko and others.
