= Shizhuang L'Officiel =

Chinese fashion magazine

时装 L'Officiel China
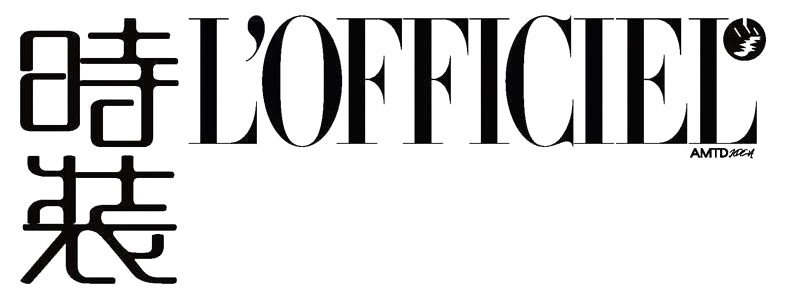

- Cover of the June 2026 issue, Cecilia Cheung by Zuo Shutong
- Editor-in-Chief: Zhang Jing (张晶)
- Categories: Fashion
- Frequency: Monthly
- Total circulation: 839,000 (2021)
- Founder: Chen Tianbo
- First issue: June 1980; 46 years ago
- Company: Fashion Magazine Co., Ltd. (1980–present)
- Country: China
- Based in: Beijing
- Language: Chinese
- ISSN: 1002-4158

时装 L'Officiel China, previously published as 时装 Fashion, and commonly known as 时装 [Shizhuang], is a Chinese monthly fashion magazine. It is the oldest operating fashion magazine in China and since 2003 has served as the Chinese edition of the French fashion magazine L'Officiel.

== Background ==
时装 [Shizhuang] L'Officiel China is the Chinese edition of French fashion magazine L'Officiel. It was founded in 1980 by Chen Tianbo as 时装 [Shizhuang] Fashion and is the oldest operating Chinese fashion magazine. From 2001 to 2002 it was associated with the Korean fashion magazine Farbe and from December 2003 it began to be published as the Chinese edition of L'Officiel in co-operation with Éditions Jalou (since 2022 with The Generation Essentials Group).

L'Officiel previously operated a Chinese-language edition from 1987 to 1990 and in 2002 from Hong Kong.

The magazine is a monthly publication published twelve times per year.

=== Editors ===
Editor	Start year	End year	Ref.
as 时装 [Shizhuang] Fashion (1980–2003)
Chen Tianbo (陈天宝)	1980		
Fei Dasheng (费达生)			
Zhou Changqing (周长青)	1999		
as 时装 [Shizhuang] L'Officiel China (2003–present)
Cheng Min (程敏)	2003		
Zhang Jing (张晶)	2017	present	

== History ==
Shizhuang Fashion was founded in 1980 as a quarterly. It was the first fashion magazine to be published in the People's Republic of China's due to Reform and opening up. During this early period the magazine featured a mix of academic, consumer, and trade information. Chen Tianbo was the first editor and in this early period he was the sole employee, writing and proofreading articles with a ballpoint pen from a small room inside the Ministry of Foreign Economic Relations and Trade.

In 1983, Shizhuang Fashion organised the first Chinese fashion show it featured designs by Pierre Cardin. In co-operation with the Bunka Fashion College, the first Chinese fashion education course was launched utilising Japanese textbooks in 1985.

Zhou Changqing was appointed editor of the magazine in 1999 and overhauled the title, notably opening a branch office in New York City. It was from this branch office that in 2001 that the Japanese flag dress scandal occurred. In a photoshoot for a 2001 issue of Shizhuang Fashion, actress Zhao Wei wore a Heatherette dress featuring a rising run flag, this saw Zhao branded as a "traitor".

In December 2003, the magazine entered into a publishing agreement with Éditions Jalou and rebranded to 时装 L'Officiel China, now distributed across mainland China, Hong Kong and Macau. The first issue featured Emmanuelle Béart on the cover.

A Chinese-language version of L'Officiel launched for Singapore in July 2026 under the Shizhuang L'Officiel title. An English-language Singaporean edition has been in publication since 2007.

=== Circulation ===
In the mid-1980s the magazine had a circulation of 300,000. In 1986 it boasted a circulation of 730,000 copies and a readership of one million people.

== Editions ==
- 时装 L'Officiel China (since Summer 1980)
- L'Officiel Singapore 时装新加坡 (since July 2026)

== See also ==
- List of L'Officiel China cover models
- L'Officiel, Original French edition in publication since 1921
