= Ana Torrejón =

Argentine journalist

Ana Torrejón, is an Argentine journalist and fashion editor, previously serving as the editor-in-chief of Elle Argentina from 1993 to 2007, Harper's Bazaar Argentina from 2011 to 2017, and since 2018 she has served as the editor-in-chief of L'Officiel Argentina.

== Career ==
After graduating from the Instituto Grafotécnico of Buenos Aires, Torrejón worked for Siete Días (1981–1983), La Semana (1983–1985), Para Ti (magazine) (1986–1988), and Claudia (1988–1990). From 1991 to 1993 she served as the editor-in-chief of Claudia. She then joined Elle Argentina as its editor-in-chief in 1994, editing the magazine until 2007. She also oversaw the operations Elle Deccoración, Elle Novias, and oversaw the launch of Elle in Chile.

In 2006, she joined the University of Palermo as a professor. Following her departure from Elle Argentina in 2007, she joined Hermès in 2009 as the communications director for Argentina. She exited the position in 2011 to edit Harper's Bazaar Argentina.

In 2018, Torrejón was appointed editor-in-chief of L'Officiel Argentina, becoming the titles founding editor.
