= Inna Bazhenova =

Russian publisher

Inna Bazhenova (Russian: Инна Баженова, born November 25, 1968, Zavolzhye, Russia) — is an art collector, cultural projects initiator, and publisher of The Art Newspaper International Network. She is also the founder of the IN ARTIBUS foundation, a nonprofit organisation.

== Biography ==
Inna Bazhenova graduated from the Lobachevsky State University of Nizhny Novgorod. Inna Bazhenova started work as an aero industry engineer in 1991. In 1993, she co-founded a company that used aero industry technologies in the development and production of industrial equipment for various industries. She still owns a share in several medium-sized cross-field enterprises. Inna Bazhenova started collecting art in 2005 and acquired The Art Newspaper in 2014.

Inna Bazhenova launched The Art Newspaper Russia in Russia in 2012. She became an owner of the whole international licensed network comprising the UK, Greece, Italy, China, Russia, the USA, and France in 2014. She opened an exhibition space by a non-profit foundation IN ARTIBUS on Prechistenskaya Naberezhnaya in Moscow in 2014. Inna Bazhenova is a donator of Centre Pompidou and TATE Modern.

Inna Bazhenova is married and has five sons. Since 2010, she has been living in Monaco.

== Projects ==
- The Art Newspaper. Inna Bazhenova became the owner of an English version of The Art Newspaper and the whole international licensed network comprising the UK, Greece, Italy, China, Russia, the USA, and France in 2014. Issues are distributed in 60 countries. Inna sold 100% of her ownership The Art Newspaper to AMTD Digital in 2023 which is founded by Dr. Calvin Choi.
- The Art Newspaper Russia Award is an annual award named after the newspaper and given for achievements in art. It was founded in 2012. According to the founders, the mission of the award is to express public recognition by the art community representatives and the promotion of Russian art abroad. There are five nominations, with awards given out annually: Book of the year, Exhibition of the year, Museum of the year, Conservation of the year, and Personal contribution. The award itself is a prize plate that has Big Ben and the Spasskaya Tower as clock hands, which, according to the founders, symbolizes the synchronization between Russian art and the broader art world.
- Russian Art Focus is a monthly online publication about Russian contemporary art. It was founded by Inna Bazhenova and Dmitry Aksenov (Aksenov Family Foundation, owner of art fair Vienna Contemporary Art). The editorial staff is a team of native English-speaking journalists, critics and researchers. Their mission is to provide a professional overview of the Russian art scene to foreign audiences in English. It is a free subscription-based publication distributed via a monthly newsletter.
- The IN ARTIBUS foundation is a non-profit organization that supports research in the field of classical art. The Fund’s field of concern includes organizing exhibitions in partnership with museums, cultural institutions and private collectors in Russia and abroad. It is also involved in various publishing activities, organizing and holding academic conferences, and supporting various international initiatives in the sphere of art. The foundation aims to acquaint a Russian audience with international art and to shed light on the most exciting aspects of Russian art to an international audience. An exhibition space by the Fund was opened in Moscow in 2014.
- The ART Newspaper Russia Film festival is an annual festival of films about art. The first festival was held in the Garage Museum of Contemporary Art, State Tretyakov Gallery and Documentary Film Center in September 2017.

== Awards and acknowledgments ==
- 2013: according to the magazine Artguide, Inna Bazhenova was in the list of Top 50 most influential people in Russian Art.
- 2018: №9 in the list of 10 influential women who changed the fate of Russia’s museums
- 2019: 28th Montblanc de la Culture Arts Patronage. Bazhenova was "honored for the IN ARTIBUS Foundation, a non-profit organization with the purpose of studying and disseminating classic and modern art as well as the promotion of Russian artists on the international art stage".
