= Neena Haridas =

Indian journalist and writer (born 1973)

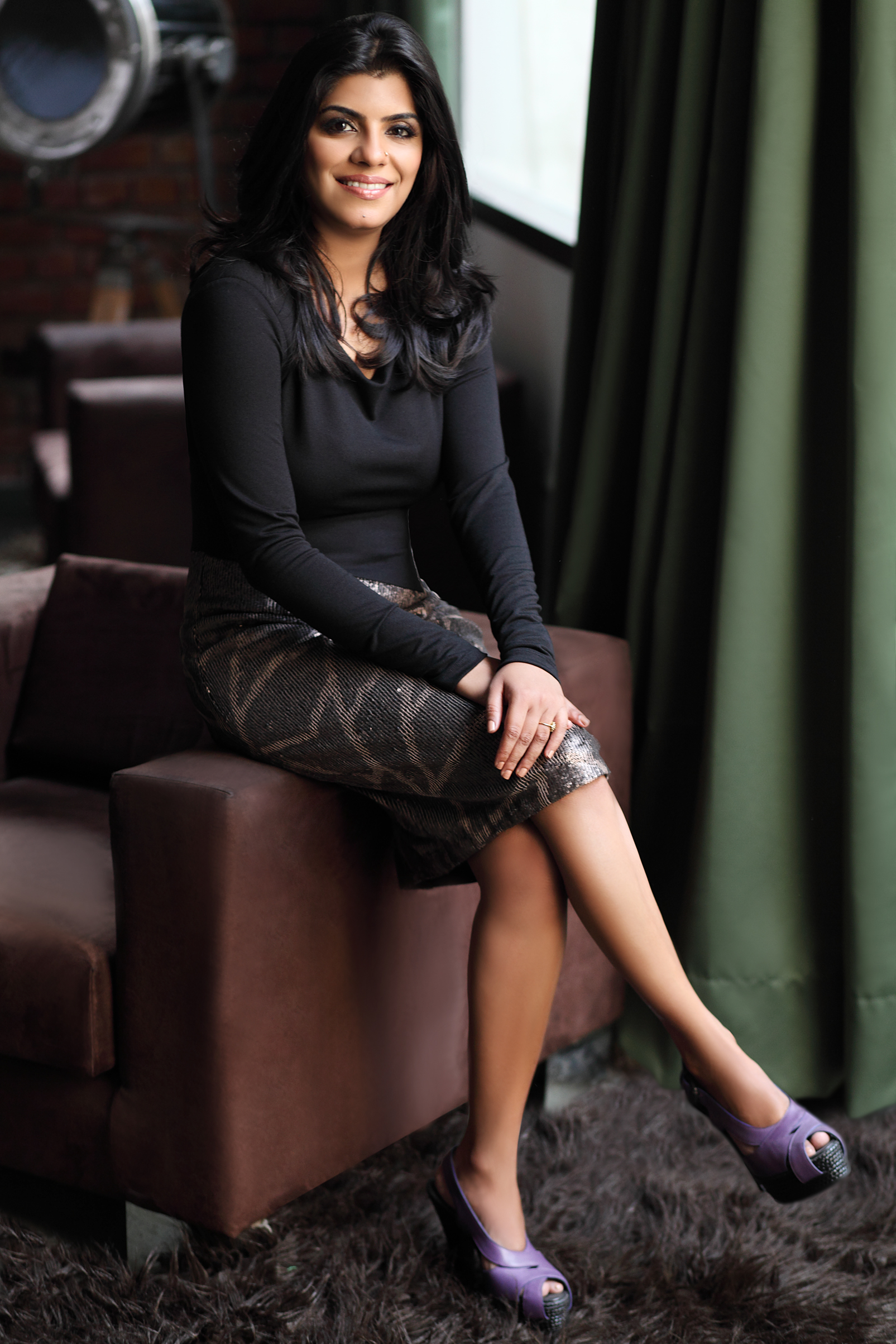
- Born: 16 July 1973 (age 53)
- Citizenship: India
- Occupations: Journalist and Writer
- Writing career
- Language: English
- Years active: 23
- Subjects: fashion, design and art

Neena Haridas is an Indian journalist and writer. She is the founder-director of Last Leaf Ideas that works towards sustainability and fair practice in the lifestyle and luxury community. She specialises in fashion, beauty, art, lifestyle design and is also known for being a commentator on television. She was until recently Editorial Director of the Indian edition of the French haute couture magazine L'Officiel. She worked as the Editor of the Indian edition of the international beauty and fashion magazine Marie Claire from 2010 to 2013. Before joining TCG Media Limited in 2016 she worked as Editorial Director at Blouin Artinfo in New York. She was also advisor to Marie Claire International.

Before that, she worked at Business Standard, The Pioneer, The Telegraph and HT City, and she also worked as a features editor at News X Channel. Her views about fashion have been quoted in the media. For example, she believes that fashion should be ethical and sustainable and not just for elites but for the masses, that the general public should take fashion more seriously, and that the fashion industry should be more active towards influencing future styles rather than merely reporting what people have been wearing.

In 2011, she criticised a decision by Vogue magazine to employ fashion models younger than eighteen years old. She interviewed Paris Hilton and described her as "down-to-earth" and noted that Hilton loves Indian fashion designers. In 2017, Haridas was quoted in the bestseller book by Myra Macdonald, Defeat is an Orphan: How Pakistan Lost the Great South Asian War published by Hurst Publishers for her reportage on the infamous hijack of IC 814 flight from Nepal to New Delhi.

== Personal life ==
Haridas is married and lives in Gurgaon.
