= Carlo Mazzoni =

Italian writer

Carlo Mazzoni (born 9 July 1979) is an Italian novelist.

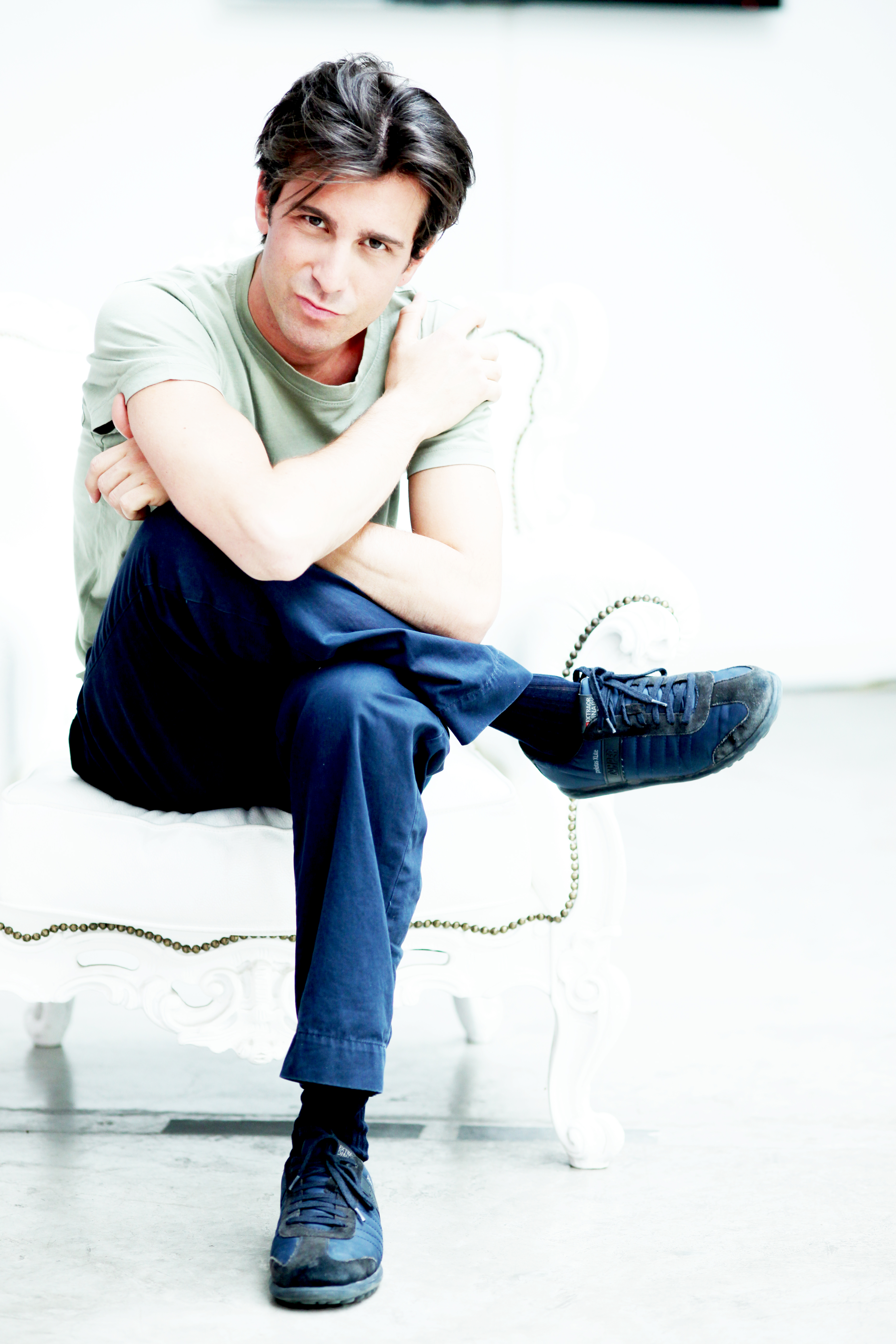
Carlo Mazzoni

== Life ==
Carlo Mazzoni was born and lives in Milan.

In 2003 he graduated in Medicine and Surgery at University of Milan.

Carlo Mazzoni studied music and graduated at Conservatorio Vivaldi, Alessandria. Determined to be a professional writer, he started working at the Italian Vogue.

Carlo Mazzoni found himself with diabetes when he was ten. Dietetic supports, insulin injections, lifetime rules have been strengthening his character: an issue that would be later the focus for the novel Due Amici - "Two friends" Due amici.

== Works ==
In 2007, Mazzoni's first novel The Postromantics was released by the ancient publishing house Salani. His short stories appeared on Nuovi Argomenti, one of the most important literary magazine in Italy.

In 2009, the sequel Il disordine, was launched by Salani.

On 9 April, Carlo Mazzoni was called to be part of the Cultural Manifesto of the city of Milan, edited by the Corriere della Sera team. With such a role, Mazzoni introduced the Expo 2015 Estates General in July 2009.

In May 2011, Due amici is released. The publishing house is Fandango. It is a biographic novel which narrates the psychological comparison between two young friends. A public reading was loaded at Turin International Book Fair.

From September 2012 to September 2014, Mazzoni is the Editor in Chief of L'Officiel Italia, the Italian edition of the French magazine L'Officiel. He quit L'Officiel Italia to join Lampoon Magazine.

== Bibliography ==
=== Fiction ===
- I postromantici. Milan: Adriano Salani Editore, 2007.
- Il disordine. Milan: Adriano Salani Editore, 2009
- Due amici. Rome: Fandango, 2011.

=== Non-fiction ===
- A Beautiful Set. Milan: Leonardo International, 2007.
- Double Life. Milan: Mondadori, 2010.
- The Key of Algernon. Milan: Mondadori, 2011.
- The Glam Culture. Milan: Mondadori Electa 2013

== Discography ==
It's in 2009 that Carlo Mazzoni fixed his multifaceted expressive will. He managed to explain his eclectic intent to different art fields. He believes that versatility is the only contemporary meaning of cultured literature. The encounter with the producer Umberto Iervolino led to the beginning of Carlo Mazzoni's sound research. In April 2009, Il sole non-serve (The sun is useless) was released – the song was recorded at Aisha Studios, mixed by Marco D’Agostino at 96 kHz, published by Universal Music Group. Il sole non-serve achieved a good agreement both in Italy and abroad.

In December 2011, the new song Il fuoco is released. It is linked to the novel Due amici. In December 2014, La Regina is released. It is presented as a poem instead of a song.
