= Umberto Allemandi =

Italian publisher (1938–2026)

Umberto Allemandi (9 March 1938 – 9 March 2026) was an Italian publisher and editor. In 1983, he founded the art journal Il Giornale dell’Arte, which he published for 42 years.

== Life and career ==
Allemandi was born in Turin on 9 March 1938.

He started working as a copywriter with the studio Armando Testa in the 1970s. In 1983 he founded the art newspaper Il Giornale dell'Arte. In 1990 Allemandi, together with Anna Somers Cocks, started an English edition titled The Art Newspaper, which he co-edited until 2002. In 1994 he launched a French edition, Le Journal des arts. Between 2002 and 2014 Allemandi also published Il Giornale dell’Architettura - a monthly publication reporting on architecture, construction, design, urban planning and the environment.

Allemandi also published books on art and architecture, including monographs on Salvador Dalì, René Magritte, Carlo Mollino, Claudio Silvestrin and Federico Zeri.

Allemandi's publishing company, Umberto Allemandi & Co, was acquired by Intesa Sanpaolo in 2024.

Allemandi died on 9 March 2026, on the day of his 88th birthday.

== Award ==
In 1992, Allemandi received the "National Award for Culture" from the then Prime Minister of Italy Carlo Azeglio Ciampi for the publishing category.
