= L'Officiel Art =

French art magazine

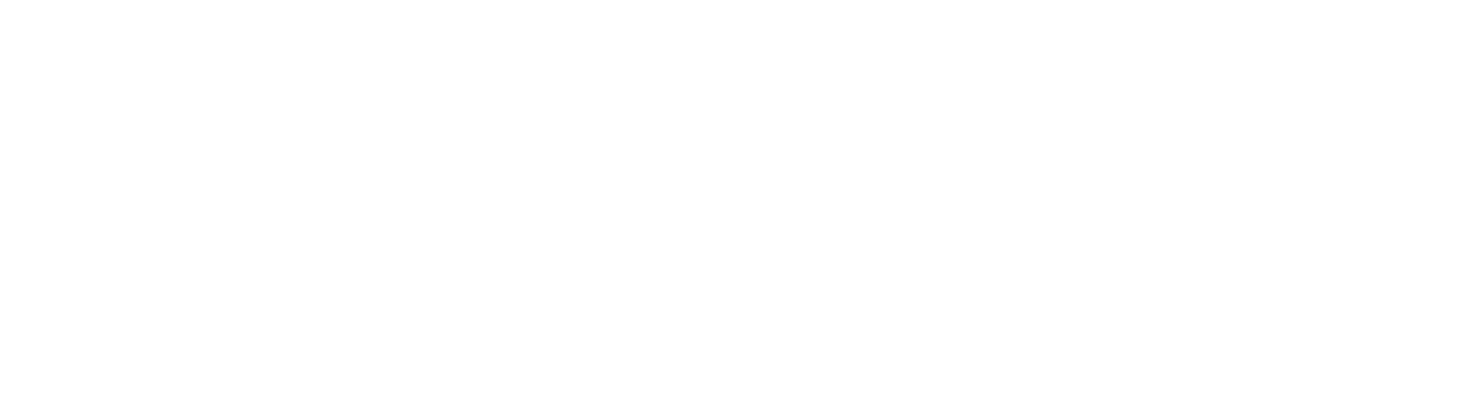

- Cover of the December 2016/January/February 2017 issue, Amalia Ulman by Giasco Bertoli
- Categories: Art
- Founder: Benjamin Eymère; Victoire de Pourtalès
- First issue: April 2012; 14 years ago
- Company: Éditions Jalou (2012–2022); The Generation Essentials Group (2022–present)
- Country: France
- Based in: Paris
- Language: French, English
- Website: lofficiel.com/categories/art
- ISSN: 2262-1415

L'Officiel Art (French pronunciation: [lɔfisjɛl]; stylised in all caps), is a French art magazine that began publication in 2012 as a spin-off of the French fashion magazine, L'Officiel. Under the control of Éditions Jalou until its 2022 acquisition by Hong Kong–based AMTD, the magazine is now operated through a French subsidiary, The Generation Essentials Group.

== Background ==
L'Officiel Art is a French art magazine founded in 2012 by Benjamin Eymère and Victoire de Pourtalès.

The magazine was a quarterly publication from 2012 to 2020, published four times per year for March/April/May, June/July/August, September/October/November, and December/January/February. After the cessation of publication in 2020, L'Officiel introduced an annual 'Art' issue, from 2024 this themed issue was scrapped and L'Officiel Art transitioned into a digital publication.

L'Officiel Art was published by Éditions Jalou from launch, the Jalou family sold the magazine and their publishing house in 2022 to AMTD. As of 2026, L'Officiel Art is under the control of The Generation Essentials Group.

=== Editors ===
Editor	Start year	End year	Ref.
L'Officiel Art Paris (2012–2018)
Jérôme Sans	2012	2014	
Olivier Reneau	2012	2013	
Victoire de Pourtalès	2013	2014	
Marie-José Jalou	2013	2015	
William Massey	2014	2016	
Pierre-Alexandre Matéos (Note: As 'Curator', alongside Charles Teyssou)	2017	2018	
Charles Teyssou (Note: As 'Curator', alongside Pierre-Alexandre Matéos)	2017	2018	
L'Officiel Art International (2018–present)
Bruna Roccasalva	2018	2019	
Olympia Scarry (Note: As 'Curator')	2019	2019	
Pierre-Alexandre Matéos (Note: As 'Guest Editor', alongside Charles Teyssou)	2020	2020	
Charles Teyssou (Note: As 'Guest Editor', alongside Pierre-Alexandre Matéos)	2020	2020	
Marie-José Jalou	2021	2021	
Vanessa Bellugeon	2022	present	

== History ==
L'Officiel Art launched in March 2012, founded by Benjamin Eymère and Victoire de Pourtalès as a quarterly spin-off of L'Officiel dedicated to contemporary art. Jérôme Sans served as the creative director and editor-in-chief of the magazine, the cover of the first issue was designed by Daniel Buren and the issue included the contributions of Francesco Vezzoli and Erwin Wurm, among others.

In 2013, Marina Abramović and Terence Koh created a performance art piece for the cover of the magazine.

L'Officiel Art Paris rebranded to L'Officiel Art International in 2018. The publication now had 80,000 copies published quarterly and distributed around France, Hong Kong, Italy, Singapore, Switzerland, the United Arab Emirates, the United Kingdom and the United States. It was now under the direction of Bruna Roccasalva and published exclusively in English. The first rebranded issue (October 2018) featured Kerry James Marshall on the cover and included the contributions of Cecilia Bengolea, Helen Cammock, Maurizio Cattelan, Jennifer Flay, Petrit Halilaj, Jacqueline Humphries, Chris Kraus, Sarah Lucas, Mike Nelson, Suzanne Pagé, Tomás Saraceno, Ingrid Schaffner, Amy Sillman, Martine Syms, Andra Ursuța and, Fatoş Üstek. The magazine also participated in the 2018 editions of Art Basel (Miami Beach), Art Düsseldorf (Düsseldorf), Artissima (Turin), Asia Now (Paris), Foire Internationale d'Art Contemporain (Paris), and Paris Photo (Paris).

At the 2023 edition of Art Basel Hong Kong, L'Officiel Art exhibited and opened a magazine newsstand.

In 2026, alongside The Art Newspaper Hong Kong, L'Officiel Art was designated as a media partner for the "Art in Resonance" programme of The Peninsula Hong Kong.

== Foreign editions ==
=== Operating ===
- L'Officiel Art Italia (for Italy, from 2017 to 2017 and since 2022)
- L'Officiel Art USA (for the United States, since 2020)

=== Defunct ===
- 市场周刊 L'Officiel Art China 艺术财经 (for China, from 2011 to 2014)
- L'Officiel Art España (for Spain, from 2016 to 2018)
- L'Officiel Art Belgium (for Belgium, from 2019 to 2020)
- L'Officiel Art Türkiye (for Turkey, from 2020 to 2024)
- L'Officiel Art Polska (for Poland, from 2021 to 2022)
- L'Officiel Art Suisse/L'Officiel Art Schweiz (for Switzerland, now defunct)
- L'Officiel Art Middle East (now defunct)

== See also ==
- The Art Newspaper
