= The Generation Essentials Group =

French media and entertainment company

- Type: Public company
- Traded as: NYSE: TGE; LSE: TGE
- Founded: June 5, 2025; 16 months ago
- Headquarters: Paris, France
- Area served: Worldwide
- Key people: Calvin Choi (Director); Feridun Hamdullahpur (Chairman)
- Revenue: ▲$98.3 million (2025)
- Net income: ▲$47.7 million (2025)
- Total assets: $839.1 million (2025)
- Number of employees: 166 (2025)
- Subsidiaries: The Art Newspaper; L'Officiel
- Website: thegenerationessentials.com

The Generation Essentials Group is a French media and entertainment company. It is the parent company of the fashion magazines L'Officiel, L'Officiel Hommes, and London/New York City based The Art Newspaper. The group also owns hospitality companies, alongside producing and investing films in a partnership with Alibaba Pictures.

== History ==
AMTD Digital acquired the Hong Kong-based financial technology media outlet DigFin in 2021.

AMTD acquired Éditions Jalou in January 2022, with the purchase they acquired the Jalou family publications L'Officiel, L'Officiel Hommes, and La Revue des Montres.

L'Officiel Coffee opened a pop-up coffeehouse at the World Economic Forum in Davos, Switzerland, in early 2023. In October 2023, AMTD purchased The Art Newspaper and the purchase included the newspapers The Art of Luxury magazine.

AMTD World Media and Entertainment Group (AMTD WME) was created in August 2023 to oversee on the entertainment, hospitality and media divisions of AMTD.

In June 2025 a de-SPAC transaction business combination occurred that saw AMTD WME and Black Spade Acquisition II Co. merge to form The Generation Essentials Group (TGE). TGE continues to licence The Art Newspaper and L'Officiel brands from AMTD Group. The Generation Essentials Group was listed on the NYSE following the completion of the agreement.

In 2025, L'Officiel Coffee and L'Officiel Bar opened their first permanent outlets in Tokyo, Japan. It was announced in November 2025 that TGE had signed an agreement to purchase The Ritz-Carlton Hotel in Perth, Australia.

== Subsidiaries ==
List of The Generation Essentials Group subsidiaries
Name	Year founded	Year acquired	Notes
Media
L'Officiel	1921	2022 (Note: Acquired by AMTD before the establishment of The Generation Essentials Group)	Operated through L'Officiel
L'Officiel Hommes	1977	2022	Operated through L'Officiel
La Revue des Montres	1989	2022	Operated through L'Officiel
The Art Newspaper	1990	2023	Operated through The Art Newspaper
L'Officiel Art	2012	2022	Operated through L'Officiel
DigFin	2017	2021	
The Art of Luxury	2023	2023	Operated through The Art Newspaper
Hospitality
iClub AMTD Hotels	2020	2020	1 hotel
Dao by Dorsett AMTD Hotels	2022	2022	2 hotels (1 under development)
L'Officiel Coffee	2023	2023	3 coffeehouses (1 under development)
L'Officiel Bar	2025	2025	2 bars
Ritz-Carlton	1983	2025	1 hotel franchise (50% stake)
Upper View Regalia	2018	2025	1 hotel
AMTD IDEA Hotels	2026	2026	1 hotel

=== Films ===
List of films produced by The Generation Essentials Group or in a partnership with The Generation Essentials Group (or prior to the groups creation as AMTD or AMTD WME):

List of The Generation Essentials Group films
Name	Year released	Director	Notes
Shock Wave 2	2020	Herman Yau	
The White Storm 3: Heaven or Hell	2023	Herman Yau	
Moscow Mission	2023	Herman Yau	
The Goldfinger	2023	Felix Chong	
She's Got No Name	2024	Peter Chan	
The Last Dance	2024	Anselm Chan	
Atonement	2025	Ronald Cheng, Mark Wu	
A Gilded Game	2025	Herman Yau	
as The Generation Essentials Group
My First of May	2025	James Hung	
Mother Bhumi	2025	Chong Keat Aun	
Scare Out	2026	Zhang Yimou	
Dog Day Evening	2026	Tin Shu Mak	
Raging Havoc	TBA	Derek Kwok	
