= Standard (magazine) =

French magazine

- Editor: Magali Aubert, Richard Gaitet
- Categories: Culture, fashion, lifestyle
- Frequency: Quarterly magazine
- Format: A4
- First issue: 2004
- Company: Faites le zéro
- Based in: Paris
- Language: French
- Website: www.standardmagazine.com
- ISSN: 1636-4511

Standard is a French quarterly culture and fashion magazine Standard is published in Paris since 2004.

== History ==
The idea to create Standard magazine was born of a desire to fill a shortage in the French press at the time which had no support for an emerging public interested in culture and fashion alike. Standard stands out by combining the cultural heritage of the French independent press (Actuel, Technikart) and the freshness and design of creative English titles (i-D, Dazed). It is aimed at a creative, urban readership aged between 16 and 45 years.

The French edition was published by the company Faites le zéro, and was in circulation from 2002 to 2014. Its tagline was in French: "Le premier féminin unisexe", lit. 'The first unisex women magazine'.
