= Devon Dikeou =

American artist, publisher, and art collector

- Born: 1963 (age 62–63)
- Occupations: Artist; publisher; art collector

Devon Dikeou (born 1963) was an American artist, publisher, and art collector. Dikeou’s practice investigates the "in-between" — subtle interactions between artist, art object, viewer, space, and context.

== Life and education ==
Devon Dikeou is originally from Denver, Colorado. She received a B.A. from Brown University in 1986 and an M.F.A. from the School of Visual Arts in 1988.

Since the start of her career in the early 1990s, Dikeou has received several artist awards and nominations including The Sue Canon Award from the Museum of Contemporary Art Denver (2007), Assistance League of Houston (2011 and 2013), Santo Foundation (2012), and the DAM Key Award from Denver Art Museum (2017).

== Exhibitions ==
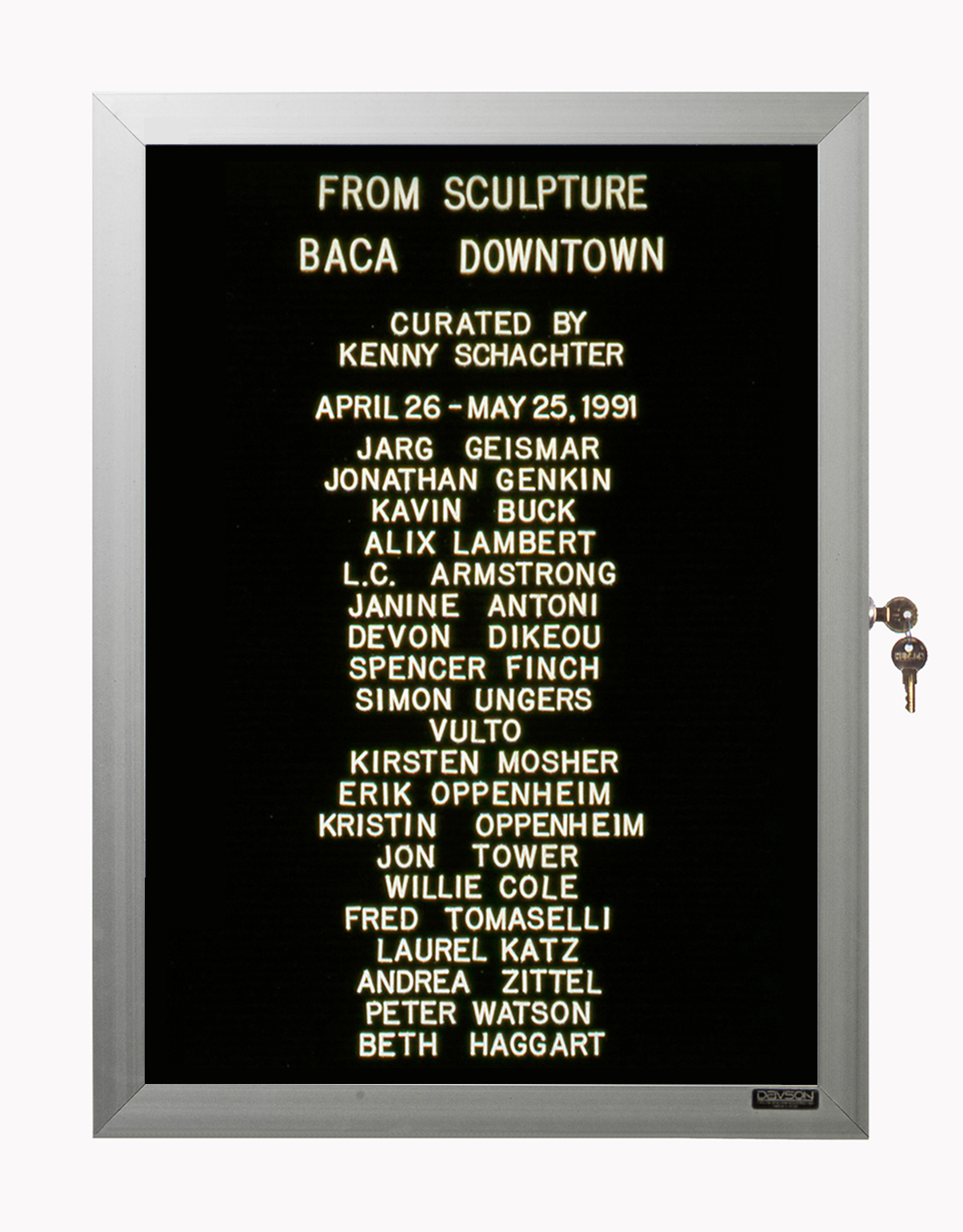
Devon Dikeou, "What's Love Got To Do With It: From Sculpture," 1991-ongoing

Dikeou has exhibited at numerous international museums, foundations, and galleries including the New Museum, The Contemporary Austin, Boulder Museum of Contemporary Art, Artpace San Antonio, Tricia Collins Grand Salon, James Fuentes Gallery in 2017 and 2018, 179 Canal, Kai Matsumiya, and Postmasters. She has also shown at art fairs, including Art Basel Statements, The Armory Show, Independent, NADA Miami Beach, and NADA New York.

Dikeou's mid-career retrospective "Mid-Career Smear" opened at The Dikeou Collection in February 2020. In 2024 Dikeou was awarded the Rome Prize in Visual Art at the American Academy in Rome.

== zingmagazine ==
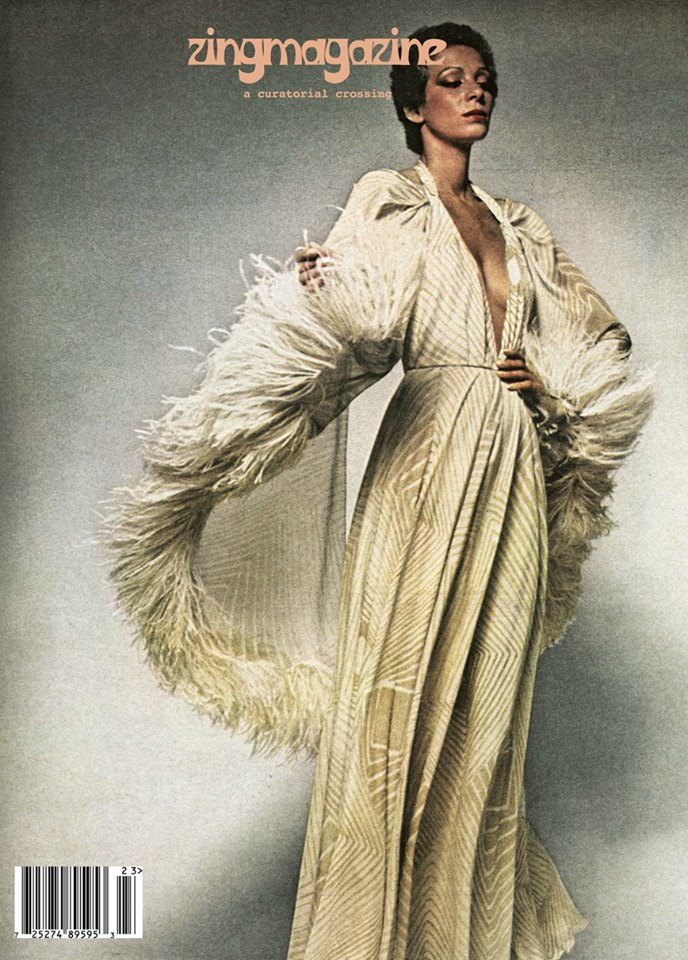
zingmagazine issue 23

Devon Dikeou published the first issue of zingmagazine in 1995. zingmagazine is composed of rotating multi-page curatorial projects organized by artists and arts professionals.

== The Dikeou Collection ==
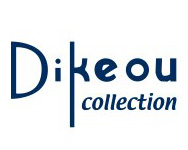
zingmagazine

In 1998, Devon Dikeou founded the Dikeou Collection along with her brother Pany Dikeou. The Dikeou Collection is a private contemporary art collection in downtown Denver, Colorado, and features work from over 40 international artists and functions as extension of zingmagazine.
