= Esther de Jong =

Dutch model, artist and writer (born 1974)

Esther de Jong (born 16 May 1974) is a Dutch model, artist and writer.

== Career ==
De Jong was raised in the Netherlands and started her career in the fashion world by chance, when she had to replace the absence of a model who had not arrived for a photoshoot with photographer Anette Aurell, for whom De Jong was working as a nanny in Paris. The photoshoot was so successful that she was presented to Marilyn Gauthier, director of the prestigious modeling agency Marilyn Agency, who offered De Jong a contract.

Esther de Jong's career was kickstarted through her early modeling experiences: being featured on the cover of Vogue Italia in January 1996 (working with fashion photographer Steven Meisel) and doing an exclusive for a Jil Sander runway show in Milan. In addition, De Jong has walked for some of the most important international fashion houses such as Alberta Ferretti, Anna Sui, Calvin Klein, Cerruti, Chanel, Chloé, Christian Dior SA, Christian Lacroix, DKNY, Dolce & Gabbana, Fendi, Iceberg, John Galliano, Karl Lagerfeld, Marc Jacobs, Max Mara, Missoni, Miu Miu, Prada, Sonia Rykiel, Sportmax and Vivienne Westwood, Versace, Alexander McQueen, Givenchy, and Ann Demeulemeester.

De Jong also starred in advertising campaigns for Dior, Chanel Cruise, Adrienne Vittadini, Alberta Ferretti, Bazar de Christian Lacroix, Bloomingdale's, Celine, Cerruti 1881, Chanel, Christian Dior lunettes, Clinique Happy, DKNY, Gianfranco Ferre, Guerlain, Hermes, Nicole Farhi, Prada, Cavalli, Rochas, Saks Fifth Avenue and Sonia Rykiel. De Jong has had the opportunity to work with photographers such as Steven Meisel and Nick Knight among many other names in fashion.

After 2003, following the birth of her son Oscar, Esther gradually reduced her appearances on the catwalk until the 125-year anniversary of Lanvin, and Prada in 2013.

Currently, Esther breeds Thoroughbred horses on her farm and participates in independent film projects.

Esther De Jong is currently represented by The Model CoOp in New York City and IMG in Paris.

== Charitable organizations ==
In 2004, De Jong founded the Home & Life Orphanage Foundation after the passing of her model agent and friend, Sam and her baby in the 2004 Indian Ocean tsunami.

De Jong is also a major supporter of the OAfrica organization which was established in 2002 and works towards helping orphans in Africa. She is also a volunteer for CASA Lexington.
