= Shreeji Newsagents =

Magazine shop in London

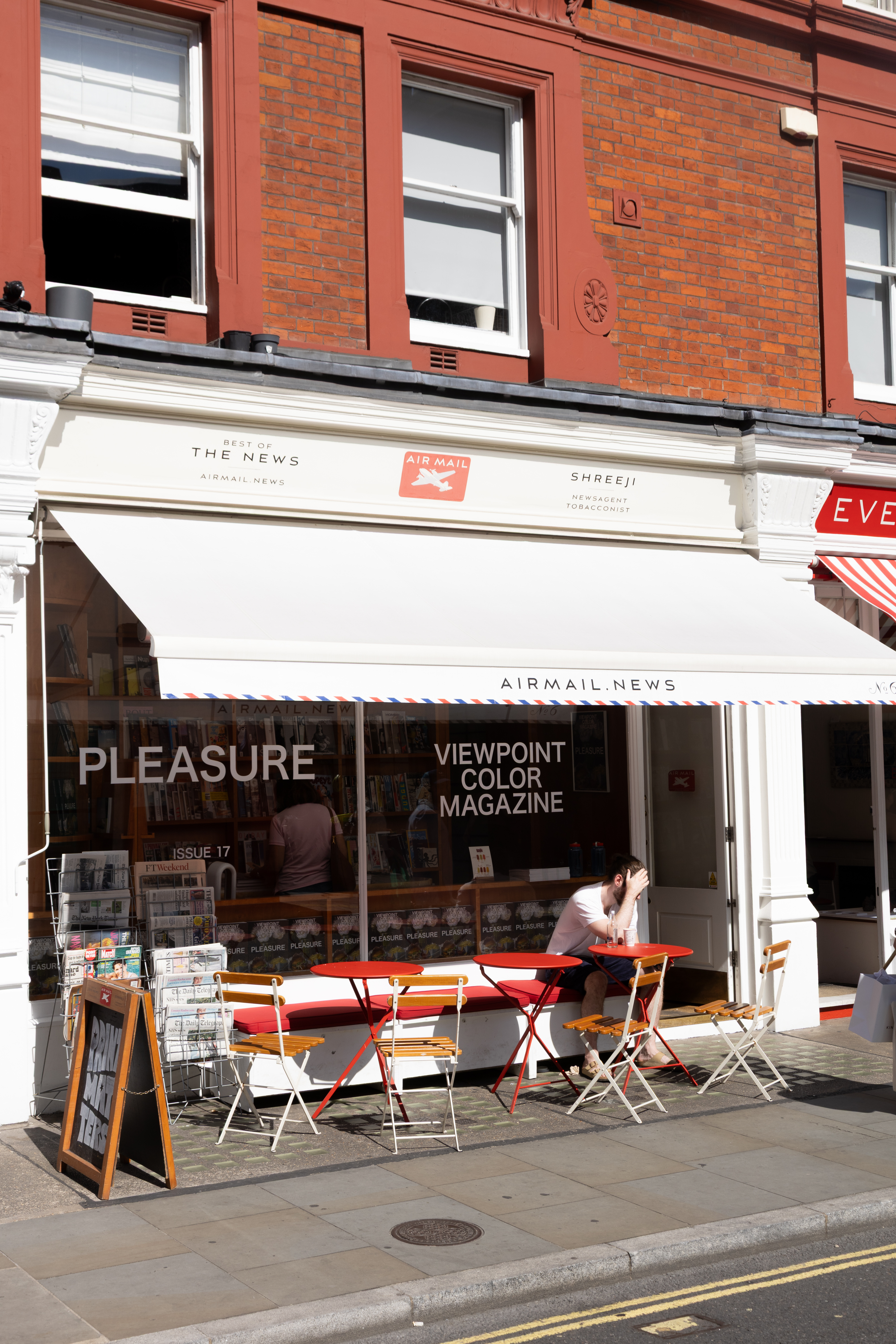
- Storefront in 2025
- Interactive map of the Shreeji Newsagents area

General information
- Location: 6 Chiltern Street, London W1U 7PT, United Kingdom
- Coordinates: 51.51866752340908°N 0.15455963840946313°W
- Opened: 1982

Shreeji Newsagents is a magazine shop on Chiltern Street in London. Considered a staple of Marylebone, The Times called it one of the "coolest" newsagents in the city.

== History ==
In 1982, Sandeep Garg, and his brother took ownership of the Shreeji Newsagents' building from its previous owners. Throughout the years, the two maintained a curation of magazines which included both established titles as well as more independent ones.

In 2014, Garg's neighbor, André Balazs, encouraged Garg to use Shreeji Newsagents as an events space, after which signing events and book launches began taking place inside. In 2017, Virgil Abloh and System hosted a signing event there.

In 2020, the store was redesigned by designer Gabriel Chipperfield and his design studio, Selected Work. Renovation took six months. In addition to its more modern aesthetic, it also has a café, a reading room, and a salon, as well as a new partnership with Air Mail where the digital publication can be read on iPads throughout the store. Following its redesign, it dubbed itself London's "first culture concept store."

== Collaborations ==
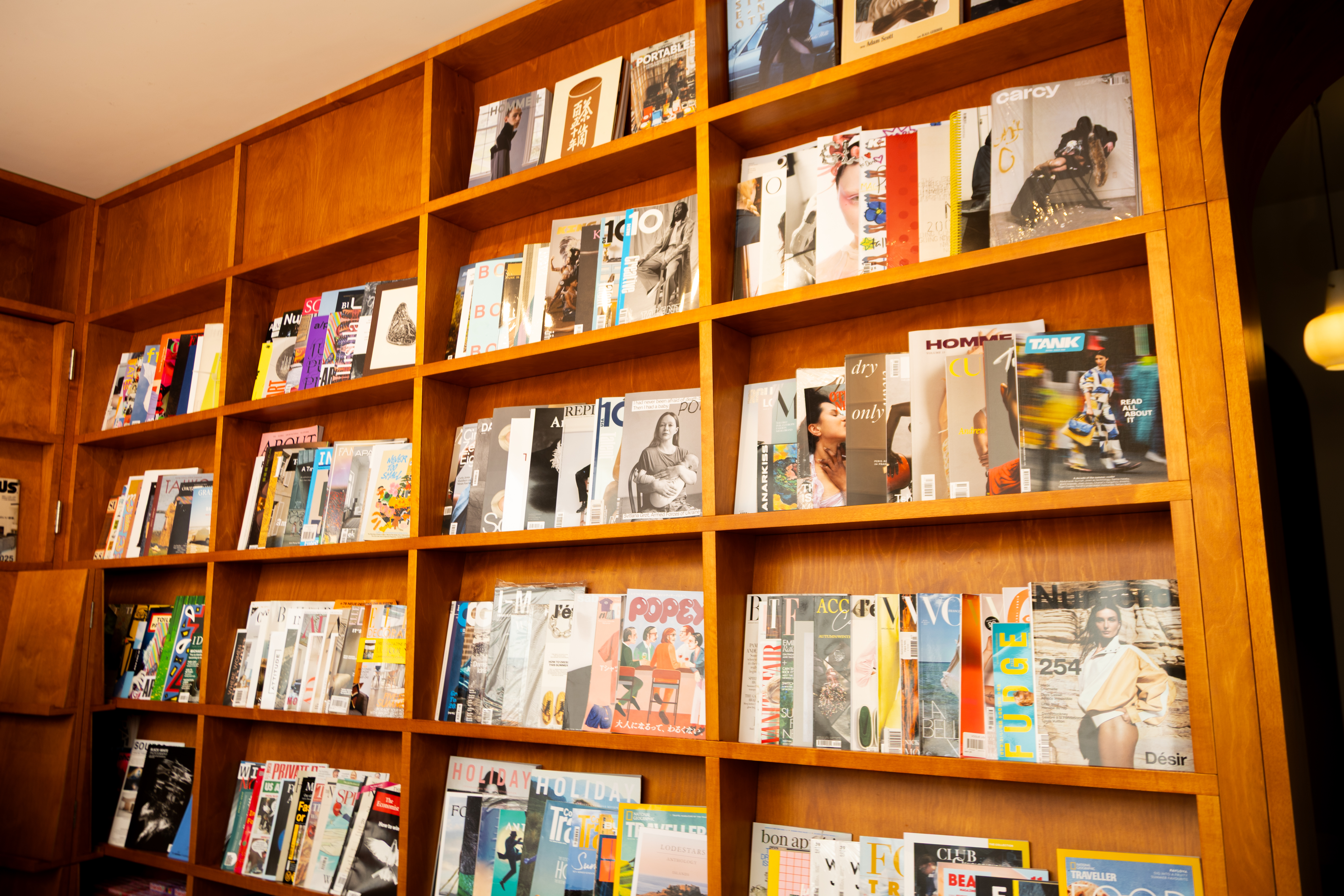
Inside the store in 2025.

In 2021, Air Mail hosted an exhibition at Shreeji Newsagents: Tracey Emin's The News Is I Love You.

In 2022, Tiffany & Co. and Air Mail collaborated to celebrate their joint Vision & Virtuosity exhibition, at the Saatchi Gallery in Chelsea, London, with a temporary takeover at Shreeji Newsagents.

In 2025, Shreeji Newsagents collaborated with the perfume brand Le Labo and sold a limited edition of the latter's Poivre 23 scent. In the same year, illustrator and designer Pip Carter displayed her work in the Shreeji Newsagents building.
