= Evelina Khromtchenko =

Russian journalist (born 1971)

- Эвелина Хромченко
- Khromtchenko in 2010
- Born: February 27, 1971 (age 55); Ufa, Russian SFSR, Soviet Union
- Occupations: Journalist, television presenter
- Years active: 1988–present
- Notable credit(s): Editor-in-Chief, L'Officiel Russia
- Website: evelinakhromtchenko.com

Evelina Khromtchenko (Russian: Эвелина Хромченко; born 27 February 1971) is a Russian journalist and television presenter. She is best known for bringing international attention to Russian fashion during her time as editor-in-chief of L'Officiel Russia.

== Early life and education ==
Khromtchenko was born in Ufa on 27 February 1971 to an economist and Russian-language teacher. Khromtchenko graduated from Moscow State University with a degree in journalism and broadcasting.

== Career ==
She began her career at a USSR state-controlled broadcasting company for children and young adults. At age 17 she was the youngest broadcaster for Channel One radio and television. She contributed to Cosmopolitan Russia and the Russian edition of Elle. In 1995, alongside her husband Alexander Shumsky, she founded a public-relations agency known as Artefact. Artefact worked with numerous celebrities and fashion brands such as Valentino, Emanuel Ungaro, and Gucci.

In 1998, Khromtchenko was appointed editor-in-chief and creative director of L'Officiel Russia. The magazine began publication a year prior and was the second foreign high fashion magazine to enter the Russian market. During her time as editor-in-chief of L'Officiel Russia she brought international attention to the Russian fashion industry.

From 2007 until 2016, she hosted Modniy Prigovor, a late-night fashion television show on Channel One.

In 2010 she was fired from her role at L'Officiel Russia and replaced by Maria Nevskaya. Her dismissal led to the revokation of the magazines publishing licence by Éditions Jalou. Éditions Jalou then signed a new licensing agreement with Premiera Media, Khromtchenko was re-appointed to her prior position. She then joined Éditions Jalou as international editorial director, overseeing more than twenty-editions of the magazine. In 2011, L'Officiel Russia ceased publication due to legal proceedings by ex-publisher Parlant. Khromtchenko exited her role at Éditions Jalou in 2013.

Khromtchenko founded Chrome Media in 2013 and in 2015 founded Evelina Fashion School.

== Filmography ==
=== Film ===
Year	Title	Director	Role	Notes	Ref.
2006	The Devil Wears Prada	David Frankel	Miranda Priestly (voice)	Russian dub	
2026	The Devil Wears Prada 2	David Frankel	Miranda Priestly (voice)	Russian dub	

=== Television ===
Year	Title	Role	Notes	Ref.
2006	Ne Rodis Krasivoy	Herself	2 episodes	
2007–2016	Modniy Prigovor	Herself (host)		
2007	Dochki-materi	Herself	2 episodes	
2007	CNN Special Investigations Unit	Herself	1 episode; Czar Putin	
2009	Trendy	Herself		
2010	Golden Gramophone Award 2010	Herself (host)		
2011	Fabrika Zyozd : Vozvryashchenie	Herself (judge)		
2011	Golden Gramophone Award 2011	Herself (host)		
2005–2019	Evening Urgant	Herself (guest)	3 episodes	
2026	Vremya	Herself (host)	2 episodes	

== Bibliography ==
- Russian Style (Assouline Publishing, 2009)

== See also ==
- L'Officiel Russia

Media offices
Preceded by Alexander Pushkin	Editor-in-Chief of L'Officiel Russia; 1998–2011	Succeeded by Maria Nevskaya, Ksenia Gorbacheva
