= The Art Newspaper =

English-language art newspaper

- Cover of the June 2024 issue
- Type: Monthly newspaper
- Owners: Umberto Allemandi (1990–2014); Inna Bazhenova (2014–2023); The Generation Essentials Group (2023–present)
- Founders: Umberto Allemandi; Anna Somers Cocks
- Publisher: Feridun Hamdullahpur
- Editor-in-chief: Benjamin Sutton
- Founded: 1990; 36 years ago
- Headquarters: London and New York City
- ISSN: 0960-6556
- OCLC number: 301312316
- Website: theartnewspaper.com

The Art Newspaper (stylised in all caps) is an international monthly arts newspaper. It has been published from London and New York City since 1990. Under the ownership of Umberto Allemandi until 2014, then Inna Bazhenova until 2023 when the newspaper was acquired by Hong Kong-based AMTD (now operated through French subsidiary The Generation Essentials).

== Editors ==
Editor-in-Chief	Start year	End year
Anna Somers Cocks	1990	1994
Laura Suffield	1994	1996
Anna Somers Cocks	1996	2004
Cristina Ruiz	2004	2008
Jane Morris	2008	2016
Javier Pes	2016	2017
Alison Cole	2017	2023
Julia Michalska	2025	2026
Benjamin Sutton	2026	present

== History ==
The Art Newspaper is published by The Art Newspaper SA and is based on an original concept by the Turin publisher, Umberto Allemandi, who founded the first monthly newspaper, Il Giornale dell'Arte, in 1983. It covers news of the visual arts as they are affected by international politics and economics, developments in law, tax, the art market, the environment, and official cultural policy. The publication is fed by a network of sister editions, with around fifty correspondents in over thirty countries.

The Art Newspaper produces daily papers during the major art fairs, such as Art Basel and Frieze, and weekly podcasts on topical subjects. It is a campaigning newspaper, which has reported regularly on the trade in illicitly excavated antiquities, on damage to the heritage in warfare, and the maladministration and corruption that prevents Venice being protected from sea level rise, excessive tourism, and the cruise ships.

Inna Bazhenova was granted the publishing license to the newspaper in the Russia edition and in Spring 2012 The Art Newspaper Russia was launched. In 2014 Bazhenova purchased The Art Newspaper for an undisclosed sum. With the purchase she became the owner of the International edition, Chinese, Greek, and French editions alongside the Russian edition which she already owned.

In 2018 the company broke relations with Le Journal des Arts and launched The Art Newspaper France. In November of the same year, The Art Newspaper Israel was founded by M.T. Abraham Group.

The Art Newspaper was bought by the AMTD Group in June 2023 and with this they announced that they planned to move the headquarters to Paris. In August, Olga Yarutina became publisher of the Russian edition. This was followed by the launch of The Art Newspaper Türkiye in September 2023.

Julia Michalska was appointed as global-editor-in-chief in 2025. Benjamin Sutton was appointed editor-in-chief (Americas), Michalska will lead the global editorial team focussing on Africa, Australia, Europe, and the Middle East; whilst Sutton will lead North and South American editorial coverage. Intentions to open offices in China, Hong Kong, Singapore, Sydney, Los Angeles, Miami and Mexico City were also announced. Currently offices operate in London and New York City.

In April 2025 a special edition of the newspaper for Singapore was released in collaboration with Cartier.

Reviewers and commentators for the paper include: former Tate director Nicholas Serota, Performa founder-director Roselee Goldberg; former Pompidou Centre director Jean-Hubert Martin; archaeologist Colin Renfrew; Venice Biennale curator Robert Storr, writer Anthony Haden-Guest, and artist Grayson Perry. The publication won the National Art Collections Fund prize in 1992.

In 2026, Michalska exited the newspaper and Benjamin Sutton replaced her as global editor-in-chief.

== Network ==
(in chronological order of year of establishment)

- Il Giornale dell'Arte (Turin, Italy, since 1983)
- The Art Newspaper (London and New York City, since 1990, from 2025 as UK edition or US edition)
- The Art Newspaper Greece (Athens, from 1992 to 2022, formerly called Ta Nea tis Technis 1992–2021)
- The Art Newspaper Edition Française (Paris, since 1994, formerly called Le Journal des Arts 1994–2018)
- El Periodico del Arte (Madrid, from 1997 to 2002)
- The Art Newspaper Russia (Moscow, founded in 2012; since 2023 the Russian edition is not affiliated with The Art Newspaper; however, remains in publication)
- The Art Newspaper China 艺术新闻 (Beijing, from 2013 to 2023; re-launching in October 2026).
- The Art Newspaper Israel (Tel Aviv, from 2018 to 2023, first published in 2019)
- The Art Newspaper Türkiye (Istanbul, since 2023)
- The Art Newspaper Hong Kong 藝術新聞 (Hong Kong, since 2026)

== Sister edition editors ==
Country/Area	Circulation dates	Editor	Start year	End year	Ref.
Italy (Il Giornale dell'Arte)	1983–present	Umberto Allemandi	1983	2025	
Italy (Il Giornale dell'Arte)	1983–present	Luca Zuccala	2025	present	
Greece (The Art Newspaper Greece)	1992–2022	Alexandra F. Koroxenidis	2021	2022	
France (The Art Newspaper Edition Française)	1994–2018	Emmanuel Fessy	1994	2001	
France (The Art Newspaper Edition Française)	1994–2018	Philippe Régnier	2001	2011	
France (The Art Newspaper Edition Française)	1994–2018	Jean-Christophe Castelain	2011	2018	
France (The Art Newspaper Edition Française)	2018–present	Alexandre Crochet	2018	present	
France (The Art Newspaper Edition Française)	2018–present	Stéphane Renault	2018	present	
Spain (El Periodico del Arte)	1997–2002				
Russia (The Art Newspaper Russia)	2012–2023	Milena Orlova	2012	2023	
China (The Art Newspaper China Edition 艺术新闻)	2013–2023	Ye Ying	2013		
China (The Art Newspaper China Edition 艺术新闻)	2026–present				
Israel (The Art Newspaper Israel)	2018–2023				
Turkey (The Art Newspaper Türkiye)	2023–present	Berrak Göçer	2023	2025	
Turkey (The Art Newspaper Türkiye)	2023–present	Aysun Öz	2026	present	
Hong Kong (The Art Newspaper Hong Kong Edition 藝術新聞)	2026–present				

== See also ==
- L'Officiel Art
