= AMTD Digital =

France headquartered based digital solutions company

AMTD Digital Inc.
- Company type: Public
- Traded as: NYSE: HKD (ADR)
- Industry: Financial technology
- Founded: 2019; 7 years ago
- Founder: Calvin Choi
- Headquarters: Paris, France
- Key people: Timothy W. Tong (Chairman)
- Revenue: ▼US$23.4 million (2024)
- Operating income: ▼US$12.1 million (2024)
- Net income: ▲US$44.4 million (2024)
- Total assets: ▼US$394.8 million (2021)
- Total equity: ▲US$372.5 million (2021)
- Owner: AMTD Idea (88.7%)
- Number of employees: 51
- Parent: AMTD Group
- Website: www.amtdigital.net

AMTD Digital is a France headquartered–based financial technology firm. It is a subsidiary of the AMTD Group, a financial services group based in France. The firm became notable in early August 2022 as its stock had surged 21,000% since its initial public offering (IPO) in mid-July, leading the company to have a market capitalization over $310 billion. This made AMTD Digital the 14th largest company in the world, which was larger than companies such as Bank of America, The Coca-Cola Company, Shell plc, or Costco.

== Company overview ==
AMTD Digital was founded in 2019 by Calvin Choi, a former UBS investment banker. The firm is owned by AMTD Idea, which holds 88.7% of its shares and is ultimately owned by the AMTD Group, a financial services group. Choi is also the chairman of the AMTD Group. Choi received a two-year ban from the securitie from the Securities and Futures Commission due to activities he performed back when he was a dealmaker at UBS.

AMTD Digital provides digital services to clients mainly from the financial sector using its software platform, AMTD SpiderNet. The company's revenue mainly comes from fees and commissions levied on its Digital Financial Service business as well as its SpiderNet Ecosystem Solutions segment.

On 15 July 2022, the firm held an IPO on the New York Stock Exchange with a price of $7.80 and ticker symbol "HKD".

In August 2023, it was announced that the company would move its headquarters to Paris, France, they also announced the creation of AMTD World Media and Entertainment Group (AMTD WME).

In 2026, the Jalou family (previous owners of L'Officiel and Éditions Jalou) launched legal proceedings against AMTD for "trademark infringement, tax fraud, and misuse of corporate assets,". The Jalou family and Inna Bazhenova (previous owner of The Art Newspaper) have not received the full proceeds of AMTD's acquisition of their respective publications.

=== The Generation Essentials Group ===
AMTD World Media and Entertainment Group was created in 2023 to oversee on the entertainment, hospitality and media divisions of the group.

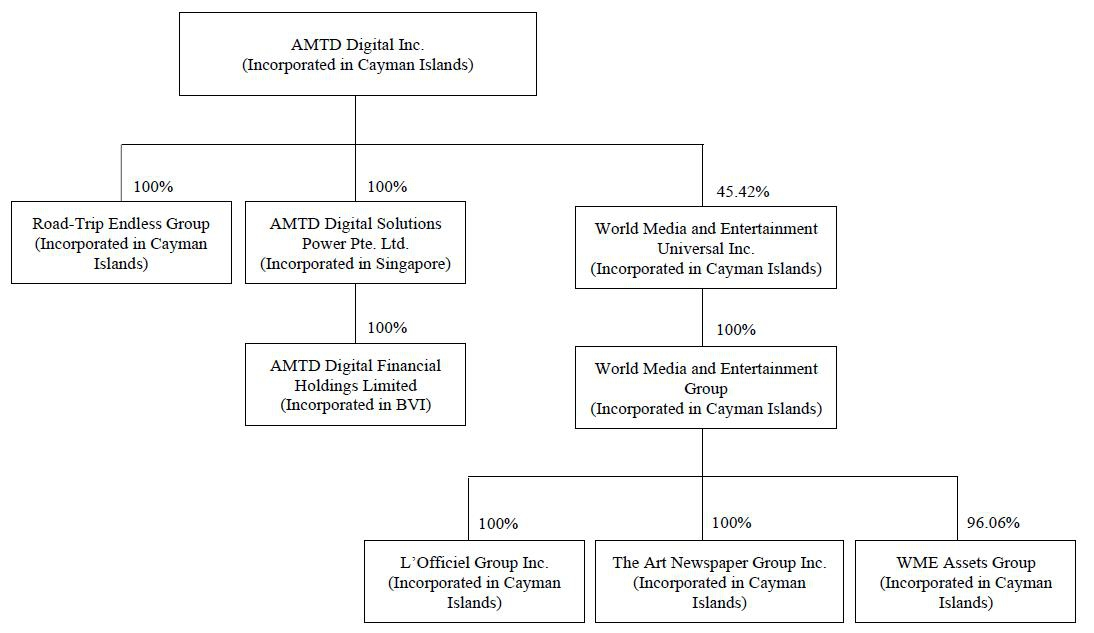
Organisational chart, as of 31 October 2024

The company is currently planned to be part of a business combination agreement which will see ownership of the company split between AMTD Digital and Black Spade Acquisition II Co. Under the acquisition the company will continue to licence The Art Newspaper and L'Officiel brands from AMTD Group. Following the agreement the company rebranded to The Generation Essentials Group (TGE) and listed on the NYSE.

TGE holds 100% ownership of The Art Newspaper, Dao by Dorsett hotels, iclub AMTD Sheung Wan hotel, L'Officiel and L'Officiel Coffee.

== August 2022 stock surge ==
The price of AMTD Digital for its listing on 15 July was $7.80 per share and by 2 August, the price had peaked at $1,679, which was an increase of 21,000% since listing. The causes of the stock surge remains unknown. One suggestion was that its ticker symbol of HKD on the NY exchange led traders to confuse it with the Hong Kong dollar. It was reported that r/wallstreetbets, a subreddit of the website Reddit, were involved, although this was denied by the users themselves. The phenomenon has drawn comparisons to the GameStop short squeeze and the AMC Theatres stock surge. Its parent company, AMTD Idea Group (NYSE:AMTD), also benefited, where it was the highest traded stock on 2 August according to Fidelity Investments and rose 300% in the same week.

Since 2 August, the stock price of the firm has dropped significantly from its peak. The losses were greater than the entire market value of companies such as Intel or Goldman Sachs. As of the end of the trading day on 16 August, the stock was valued at $181.02 per share.

Li Ka-shing's CK Hutchison Holdings, which owned shares in the firm's ultimate parent, AMTD Group, made a statement to specify that CK Hutchison has no holdings in AMTD Digital, stating it has an approximate 4% holding in AMTD Group instead.

AMTD Digital Stock Price Surge
