= Pamela Golbin =

French curator

- Education: Columbia University; Paris La Sorbonne
- Occupations: Curator, fashion historian
- Awards: Chevalier of the Ordre des Arts et des Lettres

Pamela Golbin is a French curator, author and fashion historian. From 1993 to 2018 she was the chief curator of fashion and textile at the Musée des Arts Décoratifs in Paris. In 2019 she became artistic director of the Jacquard artist's residency.

== Career ==
Golbin attended Columbia University in the City of New York and La Sorbonne in Paris, specializing in Post-World War II Abstract Expressionism. During her studies, Golbin was part of the apprenticeship program at The Metropolitan Museum of Art and worked at The Costume Institute. Concurrently, she pursued a similar program at the Musée de la Mode et du Textile in Paris where, following her studies, she was named curator at the age of 23. During her 25-year tenure at the museum, Golbin “helped shape the artistic sensibility in the industry”.

Simultaneously from 2008 to 2013 in New York City, she hosted the French Institute Alliance Française (FIAF) Annual Fashion Talks. In 2018, she attended the Executive Education management program at Harvard Business School.

In 2019, Golbin was named artistic director of the Jacquard x Google Arts & Culture Residency which aims to explore the synergies between art, fashion, and technology.

Golbin collaborates closely with contemporary designers and international creative talents. John Galliano describes her as “an incomparable source of inspiration, a true well of science." Valentino Garavani admitted, “She knows more about my own work than I do” and Dries Van Noten remarks, “She has incredible sensitivity and flair”. The Financial Times wrote about her stating, “As the chief curator of fashion and textiles at Paris’s Musée des Arts Décoratifs, Pamela Golbin is the custodian of the history of French taste”.The Business of Fashion integrates her within their yearly classification of 500 of the most influential people shaping the fashion industry, Pamela Golbin in charge of "one of the most significant and extensive collections of fashion and textiles in the world”.

Golbin is considered for her work as a historian and curator. “Just as the discipline of architecture boasts its cast of “starchitects”, this critical re-presentation of fashion has been led by a roll call of “It” curators that includes Andrew Bolton of the Costume Institute at the Metropolitan Museum of Art, New York; Valerie Steele of the Museum of the Fashion Institute of Technology, New York; and Pamela Golbin of the Musée de la Mode et du Textile, Paris”

She has been described by the press as “the brains behind the Louvre’s blockbuster fashion exhibitions”. Pamela Golbin is considered an influential figure in the fashion exhibition field. In fact, until she stepped down as chief curator in 2018, her exhibitions attracted hundreds of thousands of visitors annually.

Of her exhibits, fashion critic Suzy Menkes wrote, "Madeleine Vionnet, Puriste de la Mode’ is an intelligent and illuminating exhibition and an example of excellence from its curator, Pamela Golbin". Or "Balenciaga Paris" is the first major exhibition of Cristóbal Balenciaga held in his adopted city, and its curator, Pamela Golbin, has brought a fine intelligence to clothes that could seem so dissonant in the age of the Internet”

== Selected books ==
- Couture Confessions, Rizzoli, 2016 (ISBN 978-0-8478-4769-3)
- Fashion Forward, 300 Years of Fashion, Rizzoli, 2016 (ISBN 978-2-916914-62-6)
- Paris: Les Boulevards, Rizzoli, 2014 (ISBN 978-0-8478-4504-0)
- Dries Van Noten, Inspirations, Lanoo, 2014 (ISBN 978-2-916914-48-0)
- Fashion Icons, 2014 (ISBN 978-2-916914-52-7)
- Louis Vuitton Marc Jacobs, Rizzoli, 2012 (ISBN 978-2-916914-31-2)
- Hussein Chalayan, Rizzoli, 2011 (ISBN 978-0-8478-3386-3)
- Madeleine Vionnet: Puriste de la Mode, Rizzoli, 2009 (ISBN 978-2-916914-13-8)
- Valentino, Thèmes et Variations, Rizzoli, 2008 (ISBN 978-2-08-121607-5)
- Balenciaga Paris, Thames et Hudson, 2006 (ISBN 978-2-87811-280-1)
- Fashion Designers, Watson & Guptill, 2000 (ISBN 978-0-8230-1639-6)

== Selected exhibitions ==
(non-exhaustive list)

| Exhibition | Exhibition dates | Theme | Notes | Catalog |
|---|---|---|---|---|
| Fashion Forward, Three Centuries of Fashion | 2016; 7 April; 14 August | To mark 30 years of its fashion collection, the Musée des Arts Décoratifs brings together 300 exceptional pieces from the museum presented through a chronological timeline from 1715 to 2015 | Scenographers : Christopher Wheeldon, Jérôme Kaplan; Artistic Direction : Marc Ascoli | French, English |
| Dries Van Noten, Inspirations | 2014; 01 march 2 November | Masterpieces from the worlds of Art, Fashion, Photography and Film come together to unveil the creative processes of a fashion designer | Scenographers : Dries Van Noten, Arter; Graphic designer : Joseph Logan | French, English, Flemish |
| Louis Vuitton, Marc Jacobs | 2012; 09 march 16 September | The contributions of two major personalities from the world of luxury: Louis Vuitton, a 19th-century industrialist, and Marc Jacobs, contemporary artistic director exhibiting for the first time | Scenographers : Sam Gainsbury & Joseph Benett; Artistic Direction : Lee Swillingham | French, English, German |
| Hussein Chalayan, Récits de Mode | 2011; 5 July; 11 décember | First monograph in France | Scenographers : Zoé Smith, Bloch Architects | French, English |
| Madeleine Vionnet : Puriste de la Mode | 2009; 24 June 2009; 31 January 2010 | First major retrospective presenting the exceptional collection transmitted by the designer to the Arts Décoratifs in Paris | Scenographers : Andrée Putman; Graphic designer : Atalante Paris | French, English |
| Valentino, Thèmes et Variations | 2008; 16 June; 21 September | First French retrospective of the couturier Valentino | Scenographers : Patrick Kinmonth, Antonio Monfreda; Artistic Direction : Sam Shahid | French, English, Spanish, German, Italian |
| Balenciaga Paris | 2006; 5 July 2006; 28 January 2007 | First retrospective in Paris of the Spanish couturier Cristobal Balenciaga with the participation of Nicolas Ghesquière | Scenographers : Dominique Gonzalez-Foerster; Artistic Direction : Fabien Baron | French, English |
| Elsa Schiaparelli | 2004; 17 March; 29 August | Franco-American collaboration with the Philadelphia Museum of Art for the first retrospective bringing together the two heritage collections bequeathed by the designer to the Philadelphia Museum of Art and to the Arts Décoratifs | Scenographers : Jacques Grange | French, English |
| Design in France | 9 October; December 2004 | "Design in France", Fashion curator of the Inaugural Exhibition for the French Year in China | | French, Chinese |
| Jacqueline Kennedy, les Années Maison-Blanche | 2002; 19 November 2002; 16 March 2003 | Franco-American collaboration with the Metropolitan Museum of Art and the John F. Kennedy Library retracing the signature of the First Lady of the United States's wardrobe and its political importance | Scenographers : Pierre Charpin | French, English |
| Sixties, mode d’emploi | 2002; November 2002; 16 March 2003 | The design innovations and industry transformations of French fashion in the 1960s | Scenographers : Pierre Charpin | French |
