= Marie-José Jalou =

French journalist (born 1949)

Marie-José (above and centre) on the cover of L'Officiel Davos special issue, January 2023.

Marie-José Susskind-Jalou (born March 31, 1949) is a French journalist, fashion editor, and artist who served as editor-in-chief of L'Officiel de la couture et de la mode de Paris from 1988 to 2002 and president of Éditions Jalou from 2003 to 2022. Sara Waka called her 'the mother of the fashion industry'.

== Early life ==
She was born on 31 March 1949, the daughter of Georges Jalou and Ursel Susskind. Jalou was editor-in-chief of L'Officiel de la couture et de la mode de Paris, and Susskind was a fashion illustrator born in Berlin who escaped to the Netherlands in World War II where she met Jalou.

Her first experience in the fashion industry was at age three when she attended a Lanvin haute couture show with her mother.

== Career ==
She joined L'Officiel in 1968 as an illustrator before becoming an editor in 1978, a couture editor, and then the editor-in-chief of the magazine in 1988. While at L'Officiel, she helped introduce many international designers to the French market, including Yohji Yamamoto and Giorgio Armani.

Following the death of her brother Laurent Jalou in 2003, she took over his position as president of Les Éditions Jalou. As the president, she expanded the company from a presence in six countries to over eighty by 2017.

In 2011, to celebrate 90 years of L'Officiel she organised an exhibition at Iguatemi São Paulo.

Susskind-Jalou received an Ordre des Arts et des Lettres in 2014 for her contributions to the publishing industry.

She became editor-in-chief (magazine) at L'Officiel in 2016, she stayed in the role for less than a year before being replaced by Adrienne Ribes.

In 2022, the Jalou family sold Éditions Jalou and its assets to AMTD. Susskind-Jalou exited her position as editorial director of L'Officiel and president of Éditions Jalou. Her children continued their roles at the magazine with Vanessa Bellugeon as editor-in-chief (fashion), Benjamin Eymère as CEO of L'Officiel, inc., and Jennifer Eymère as the casting director.

In 2026, the Jalou family launched a lawsuit against AMTD alleging that they had not received all the money from their 2022 sale with proceeds frozen in a Hong Kong bank account owned by the brokerage firm of AMTD. AMTD is also accused of "fraudulently running the publication [L'Officiel] into the ground". Jalou was personally seeking the return of "pairs of Christian Louboutin shoes and Chanel suits" that were left at the publication and shares worth €2 million. Stating to Agence France-Presse, “L’Officiel was the fashion bible. I will never give up on it.”

== Controversy ==
At a Zac Posen show in November 2012, after the fire marshal removed 60 seats from the show space. Susskind-Jalou and her daughters Jennifer Eymère (editor-in-chief at Jalouse) and Vanessa Bellugeon (editor-in-chief at L'Officiel) were left without seats. A heated exchange happened with the show's press secretary Lynn Tesoro ending with Susskind-Jalou slapping Tesoro's face.

Eymère claimed that she slapped Tesoro, accusing Tesoro of being inappropriate to her mother (Susskind-Jalou), and after the slap, ended the interaction by saying 'Now you know you don't fuck with French people.'. Posen later sent an apology letter to Susskind-Jalou.

Tesoro then filed a lawsuit against Susskind-Jalou for battery, Eymère for libel, and all three for assault and slander. Tesoro was seeking US$1 million, which caused the incident to be nicknamed "the million-dollar slap". WWD nicknamed it "the slap heard 'round New York Fashion Week". They settled the lawsuit out of court in 2013.

== Personal life ==
She has two children with Dominique Bellugeon, Vanessa Bellugeon (born 1972) and Ronald Bellugeon (born 1973) and two children with Francis Eymère, Jennifer Eymère (born 1977) and Benjamin Eymère (born 1981). She was married to Francis Eymère until he died in 2023.
