= List of L'Officiel Hommes cover models =

Cover of the Autumn/Winter 2006 issue with Jonathan Hubert

This list of L'Officiel Hommes cover models (1977–1991; 1996–1997; 2005–present) is a catalog of cover models who have appeared on the cover of the French fashion magazine L'Officiel Hommes. From 1996 to 1997 the magazine was published as L'Officiel Homme.

== 1970s ==
=== 1977 ===
Issue	Cover model	Photographer	Ref.
September	Omar Sharif	Rodolphe Haussaire	
November	Carlos Monzon	Rodolphe Haussaire	

=== 1978 ===
Issue	Cover model	Photographer	Ref.
February	Robert Stack		
April	John Travolta		
June	Guillermo Vilas		
№6	Ryan O'Neal		
№7	Francis Huster		
№8	Alain Delon		

=== 1979 ===
Issue	Cover model	Photographer	Ref.
February	Jean-Paul Belmondo		
April	Jacques Laffite		
№11	Yannick Noah		
September/October	Michael Douglas	Patrick Bertrand	
November	Johnny Hallyday		
№14	Sophia Loren		

== 1980s ==
=== 1980 ===
Issue	Cover model	Photographer	Ref.
February/March	Klaus Kinski	Eva Sereny	
April/May	Federico Fellini		
№17	Paul Newman		
№18	Gérard Depardieu		
№19	Thierry Le Luron		
№20	Clint Eastwood		

=== 1981 ===
Issue	Cover model	Photographer	Ref.
February/March	Jacques Dutronc		
№22	Thierry Vigneron		
№23	Jimmy Connors		
№24	Yves Montand		
November	Roger Moore		
№26	Julio Iglesias		

=== 1982 ===
Issue	Cover model	Photographer	Ref.
№27	Roman Polanski		
April	Charlotte Rampling	Daniel Simon	
May/June	John McEnroe		
№30	Michel Platini		
September/October	Laurent Malet		
November	Sylvester Stallone		
№33	Brigitte Bardot		

=== 1983 ===
Issue	Cover model	Photographer	Ref.
№34	Christopher Reeve		
№35	Jacques Chirac		
May	Yannick Noah		
June/July/August	Ornella Muti		
№38	Jean-Pierre Cassel		
№39	Sean Connery		
№40	Rob Lowe		

=== 1984 ===
Issue	Cover model	Photographer	Ref.
February/March	Alain Delon		
№42			
May	Robert Redford		
June/July/August	Eric Loizeau		
September	Harrison Ford		
November	Bernard Giraudeau		
December/January 1985			

=== 1985 ===
Issue	Cover model	Photographer	Ref.
February/March	Richard Berry		
April	Julien Clerc		
May	Christophe Lambert		
June/July/August	David Bowie	Claude Gassian	
№52	Richard Anconina		
November	Jean Claude Jitrois		
December/January 1985	Alain Juppé		

=== 1986 ===
Issue	Cover model	Photographer	Ref.
№55	Al Pacino		
April	Arnold Schwarzenegger		
May			
№58			
September			
№60	Alexandre Godounov		
№61	Jean-Michel Jarre		

=== 1987 ===
Issue	Cover model	Photographer	Ref.
February/March	Don Johnson		
April/May	Paul Loup Sulitzer		
№64	Hubert Auriol		
September	Dolph Lundgren		
October/November	Gérard Depardieu		
December/January 1988	Christian Lacroix		

=== 1988 ===
Issue	Cover model	Photographer	Ref.
February/March	Michael Douglas		
April/May	Daniel Auteuil		
June/July	Sting		
№71			
October/November	Sylvester Stallone		
December/January 1989	Clint Eastwood		

=== 1989 ===
Issue	Cover model	Photographer	Ref.
№74	Étienne Daho		
April/May	Giorgio Armani		
June/July	Jeremy Irons		
September	Tom Cruise	Douglas Kirkland	
October/November	—N/a		

== 1990s ==
=== 1990 ===
Issue	Cover model	Photographer	Ref.
February/March			
№81			
June/July/August			
№83			
№84			
December/January			

=== 1991 ===
Issue	Cover model	Photographer	Ref.

=== 1996 ===
Issue	Cover model	Photographer	Ref.
March	David Ginola	Claus Wickrath	
#2			
#3			
September	Daniel Auteuil	Marcel Hartmann	
#5			
November	Vincent Lindon	Marcel Hartmann	
December/January 1997	Christophe Lambert		

=== 1997 ===
Issue	Cover model	Photographer	Ref.
February	Hugh Grant	Marcel Hartmann	
March/April	John Travolta	Sante D'Orazio	
May	Bruce Willis	Peter Lindbergh	
#11			
September	Patrick Bruel	Neil Kirk	
October	Eric Cantona	Richard Aujard	
November	Gary Oldman	Marcel Hartmann	
December/January 1998	Jeremy Irons	Karl Dickenson	

== 2000s ==
=== 2005 ===
Issue	Cover model	Photographer	Ref.
Spring/Summer	Ian Jones	Carter Smith	
Autumn/Winter 2005/2006	Marios Lekkas	Takay	

=== 2006 ===
Issue	Cover model	Photographer	Ref.
Spring/Summer (№3)		Nick Clements	
Spring/Summer (№4)	Michael Phelps		
№5			
Autumn/Winter	Jonathan Hubert	David Vasiljevic	

=== 2007 ===
Issue	Cover model	Photographer	Ref.
Spring/Summer (№7)	Wentworth Miller		
Spring/Summer (№8)	Miro Moreira	Milan Vukmirovic	
September/October/November	Kevin Federline		
December/January 2008 (№10)	Andrés Velensco	Milan Vukmirovic	

=== 2008 ===
Issue	Cover model	Photographer	Ref.
Spring/Summer (№11)	Jon Kortajarena	Milan Vukmirovic	
№12	Garrett Neff	Milan Vukmirovic	
Autumn/Winter (№13)	Roberto Bolle		
December/January 2009	Dita von Teese	Milan Vukmirovic	

=== 2009 ===
Issue	Cover model	Photographer/Illustrator	Ref.
Spring/Summer (№15)	Angela Lindvall	Milan Vukmirovic	
Spring/Summer (№15)	Andrés Velensco	Milan Vukmirovic	
№16	Jesus Luz	Milan Vukmirovic	
September/October/November	Pete Doherty		
December/January (№18)	Lido	Milan Vukmirovic	

== 2010s ==
=== 2010 ===
Issue	Cover model	Photographer	Ref.
№19	Arthur Sales	Milan Vukmirovic	
June/July/August	Andrés Velensco, uncredited	Milan Vukmirovic	
September/October/November	Vincent Robitaille	Milan Vukmirovic	
December/January 2010	Tilda Swinton	Milan Vukmirovic	

=== 2011 ===
Issue	Cover model	Photographer	Ref.
February/March/April	Pio Marmaï	Milan Vukmirovic	
June/July/August	Camille Lacourt	Milan Vukmirovic	
September/October/November	Melvil Poupaud, Annabelle Dexter-Jones, André Saraiva		
Winter	Philippe Zdar	Matthew Frost	

=== 2012 ===
Issue	Cover model	Photographer	Ref.
Spring	Jack Donoghue	Matthew Williams	
Summer	Johnny Hallyday	André Saravia	
Autumn	James Franco, Harmony Korine	Paul Jasmin	
Winter	Benicio del Toro, Chelsea Schuchman	André Saravia	

=== 2013 ===
Issue	Cover model	Photographer	Ref.
March/April/May	Kim Kardashian, Kanye West	Nick Knight	
Summer	Francesco Clemente	Magnus Unnar	
Autumn	Will Ferrell	André Saravia	
Winter	Maurizio Cattelan	Pierpaolo Ferrari	

=== 2014 ===
Issue	Cover model	Photographer	Ref.
March/April/May	André Saravia	Jean-Paul Goude	
Summer	Matt Smith	Jesse John Jenkins	
September/October/November	Chloë Sevigny	Sante D'Orazio	
December/January 2015/February 2015	Luke Grimes	Andrew Hail	

=== 2015 ===
Issue	Cover model	Photographer/Illustrator	Ref.
March/April/May	—N/a	André Saravia	
June/July/August	Erin Heatherton	Andrew Hail	
September	Clément Chabernaud	Pablo Arroyo	
September	Thibaud Charon	Pablo Arroyo	
September	Vincent Lacrocq	Pablo Arroyo	
December/January 2016/February 2016	Michael Shannon	Cédric Bihr	
December/January 2016/February 2016	Finnegan Oldfield	Osma Harvilhati	

=== 2016 ===
Issue	Cover model	Photographer	Ref.
March	Alden Ehrenreich	Johan Sandberg	
March	Karl Kolbitz	Joachim Müller-Ruchholtz	
June	Christoph Waltz	Austin Hargrave	
September	Jamie Bell	Pablo Arroyo	
September	Thibaud Charon	Pablo Arroyo	
December	Jacky Heung	Johan Sandberg	

=== 2017 ===
Issue	Cover model	Photographer	Ref.
March/April/May	Jared Leto	Thomas Whiteside	
June	Melvil Poupaud	Raf Stahelin	
September	Billy Crudup	Takay	
October	Luka Isaac	Pablo Arroyo	
November	Noah Schanpp	Eric Ray Davidson	
December/January 2018	Xavier Buestel	Philip Gay	
December/January 2018	Dylan Roques	Philip Gay	
December/January 2018	Adrien Sahores	Philip Gay	
December/January 2018	Vincent Lacrocq	Philip Gay	

=== 2018 ===
Issue	Cover model	Photographer	Ref.
February	Kobe Bryant	Satoshi Saïkusa	
March	Valentin Caron	Hugo Comte	
April/May	Diplo	Luc Coiffait	
June/July	Kylian Mbappé	Satoshi Saïkusa	
September	Joaquin Phoenix	Eric Ray Davidson	
October	Mats Vandenbosch Van Mil	James Robjant	
November	Vincent Cassel	Satoshi Saïkusa	
December/January 2019	John Legend	Eric Ray Davidson	

=== 2019 ===
Issue	Cover model	Photographer	Ref.
February	Khalid	Danielle Levitt	
February	Robert Sheehan	Massimo Pamparana	
March	Rob Raco	Casper Kofi	
March	Matthew Petersen, Zakarie Ali	Pablo Arroyo	
April	Christine and the Queens	Danny Lowe	
June/July	Laurent Grasso	Isaac Marley Morgan	
June/July	Douglas Gordon	Dennis Schoenberg	
September	Lewis Hamilton	Evan Browning	
September	Tyler, the Creator	Daniyel Lowden	
September	Benoît Magimel	Danny Lowe	
October	Charlie Plummer	Evan Browning	
November	SebastiAN	Mia Dabrowski	
December/January 2020	Harry Styles	Daniyel Lowden	
December/January 2020	Octavian	Olivier Truelove	

== 2020s ==
=== 2020 ===
Issue	Cover model	Photographer	Ref.
March	Sega Bodega	Olivier Truelove	
March	Alex Lawther	Maxwell Granger	
March	Bakar	Maxwell Granger	
Autumn/Winter	Jared Leto	Cameron McCool	
Autumn/Winter	Stan Wawrinka	DR	
Autumn/Winter	Viggo Mortensen	Quentin de Briey	
Autumn/Winter	Rafferty Law	Alan Gelati	

=== 2021 ===
Issue	Cover model	Photographer	Ref.
March	Travis Scott	Sharif Hamza	
March	Tahar Rahim	Raul Ruz	
March	Jon Kortajarena	Richard Ramos	
March	Kailand Morris	Dennis Leupold	
March	Lala &ce	Mohamed Bourouissa	
September	Maluma	Pamela Hanson	

=== 2022 ===
Issue	Cover model	Photographer	Ref.
March/April	Sebastian Stan	Greg Swales	
March/April	Tom Daley	Jacques Burga	
March/April	Joséphine de la Baume, Kano	David Reiss	
March/April	Parcels	Kenzia Bengel de Vaulx	
October	Dali Benssalah	Leon Prost	
October	Travis Barker	Sam Dameshek	
October	Regé-Jean Page	Nick Thompson	

=== 2023 ===
Issue	Cover model	Photographer	Ref.
March	Nicholas Hoult	Jason Hetherington	
March	Guillaume Canet	Léon Prost	
October	Mads Mikkelsen	Charlie Gray	

=== 2024 ===
Issue	Cover model	Photographer	Ref.
March	Zayn Malik	Dennis Leupold	
October	George Russell	Mathieu César	
October	Joseph Quinn	Danny Kasirye	
October	Rupert Friend	Charlie Gray	

=== 2025 ===
Issue	Cover model	Photographer	Ref.
March	Jon Hamm	Magnus Unnar	
June (L'Officiel Paris supplement)	Elias Monstrey	Raffaele Grosso	
October	Colman Domingo	Diego Bendezu	
October	Jeremy Strong	Odieux Boby	
December	Jay Chou	Paul	

=== 2026 ===
Issue	Cover model	Photographer	Ref.
March	Disiz	Mathieu César	
March	Tyrese Haliburton	Cristian Hunter	
March	Charles Melton	The Morelli Brothers	
March	Arnaud Valois	Leonardo Veloce	
October	Jamie Dornan	Charlie Gray	

== See also ==
- List of L'Officiel cover models
