= The Webster =

American multi-brand retailier

- Industry: Luxury Fashion & Retail
- Founded: 2008; 18 years ago
- Founders: Laure Hériard Dubreuil; Frederic Dechnik; Milan Vukmirovic
- Headquarters: Miami, United States
- Number of locations: 13 (2025)
- Area served: United States; Canada
- Key people: Laure Hériard Dubreuil (CEO); Michiel Maes (Chief Operating Officer)
- Owner: Frasers Group; Laure Hériard Dubreuil
- Parent: Frasers Group
- Website: thewebster.com

The Webster is an American luxury multi-brand retail chain founded in 2008 by Laure Hériard Dubreuil. Since 2025 the company has been owned by Frasers Group and Laure Hériard Dubreuil.

As of 2025, The Webster operates twelve stores in the United States, alongside one international location in Toronto, Canada. The Webster has collaborated with brands such as Le Bon Marché, Lane Crawford, Hôtel Ritz Paris, and Target.

== History ==
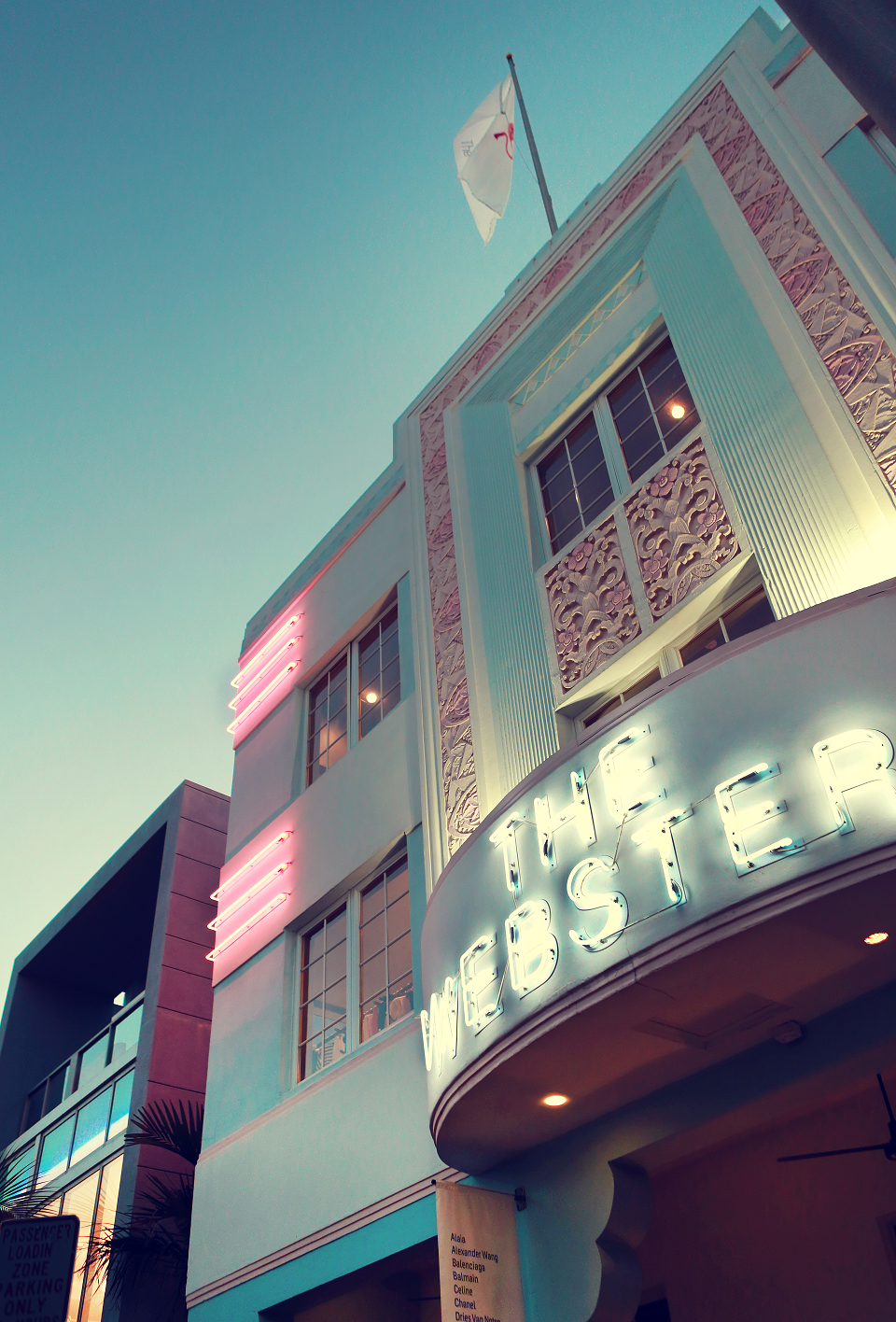
The Webster Miami storefront.

The Webster was founded in 2008 as a pop-up boutique in Miami by Laure Hériard Dubreuil, in a partnership with Frederic Dechnik and Milan Vukmirovic. Dechnik and Vukmirovic are no longer involved in the business.

In 2009 a permanent location opened at South Beach in Miami Beach.

The Webster sells women’s, men’s, and children's ready-to-wear and luxury accessories such as shoes, bags, jewelry and watches.

The South Beach flagship is a 20,000-square-foot, three-level store in South Beach’s Art Deco District. The Webster now has nine locations across the United States in South Beach and Bal Harbour, Florida, New York City, New York, Houston, Texas, Miramar, Los Angeles, Palm Springs, and Costa Mesa, California, and Toronto, Canada. Measuring approximately 12,000 square feet, the building, which dates to 1878, features six floors, including a penthouse and a David Mallet salon.

The Webster has collaborated with brands on exclusive products such as Pierre Hardy, Calvin Klein, Anthony Vaccarello, Proenza Schouler, Berluti, and Balenciaga.

In January 2015, The Webster collaborated with Le Bon Marché Paris on a capsule collection for the store’s annual “Month of White.” Laure Heriard-Dubreuil helped design and organize the collection alongside 50 designers, including Louis Vuitton. The collection was sold exclusively at The Webster Miami and Le Bon Marché in Paris. The Webster has recently collaborated with luxury Chinese department store Lane Crawford on an exclusive collection. Over 20 brands, including Coach, Courrèges, Maison Michel, Proenza Schouler, Sonia Rykiel and Thom Browne, have created exclusive products for the collaboration, all inspired by The Webster’s flamingo logo.

In 2025, the British Frasers Group acquired a majority stake in the company. Dubreuil retains a minority shareholding.

== Store locations and opening timeline ==
As of 2025, The Webster operates twelve stores in the United States, along with one international locations in Toronto, Canada.

- Atlanta, United States (The Webster Atlanta, at Lenox Square; since October 2024)
- Austin, United States (The Webster Austin, at The Domain; since 3 April 2025)
- Bal Harbour, United States (The Webster Bal Harbour, at Bal Harbour Shops; since 2013)
- Costa Mesa, United States (The Webster Costa Mesa, at South Coast Plaza; since 2016)
- Houston, United States (The Webster Houston, at The Galleria; since January 2016)
- Las Vegas, United States (The Webster Las Vegas, at Fontainebleau Las Vegas; since April 2025)
- Los Angeles, United States (The Webster Los Angeles, at Beverly Center; since 2020)
- Montecito, United States (The Webster Miramar, at Rosewood Miramar Beach; since July 2020)
- New Jersey, United States (The Webster New Jersey, at The Shops at Riverside; since October 2023)
- Palm Springs, United States (The Webster Palm Springs, on Palm Canyon Drive; since 2023)
- New York City, United States (The Webster Soho, in the SoHo neighbourhood; since 2017)
- Miami Beach, United States (The Webster South Beach, on Collins Avenue; since 2009)
- Toronto, Canada (The Webster Toronto, in the Yorkville neighbourhood; since 2022)

An outlet location previously operated at Sawgrass Mills in Sunrise from 2014.

== Products ==
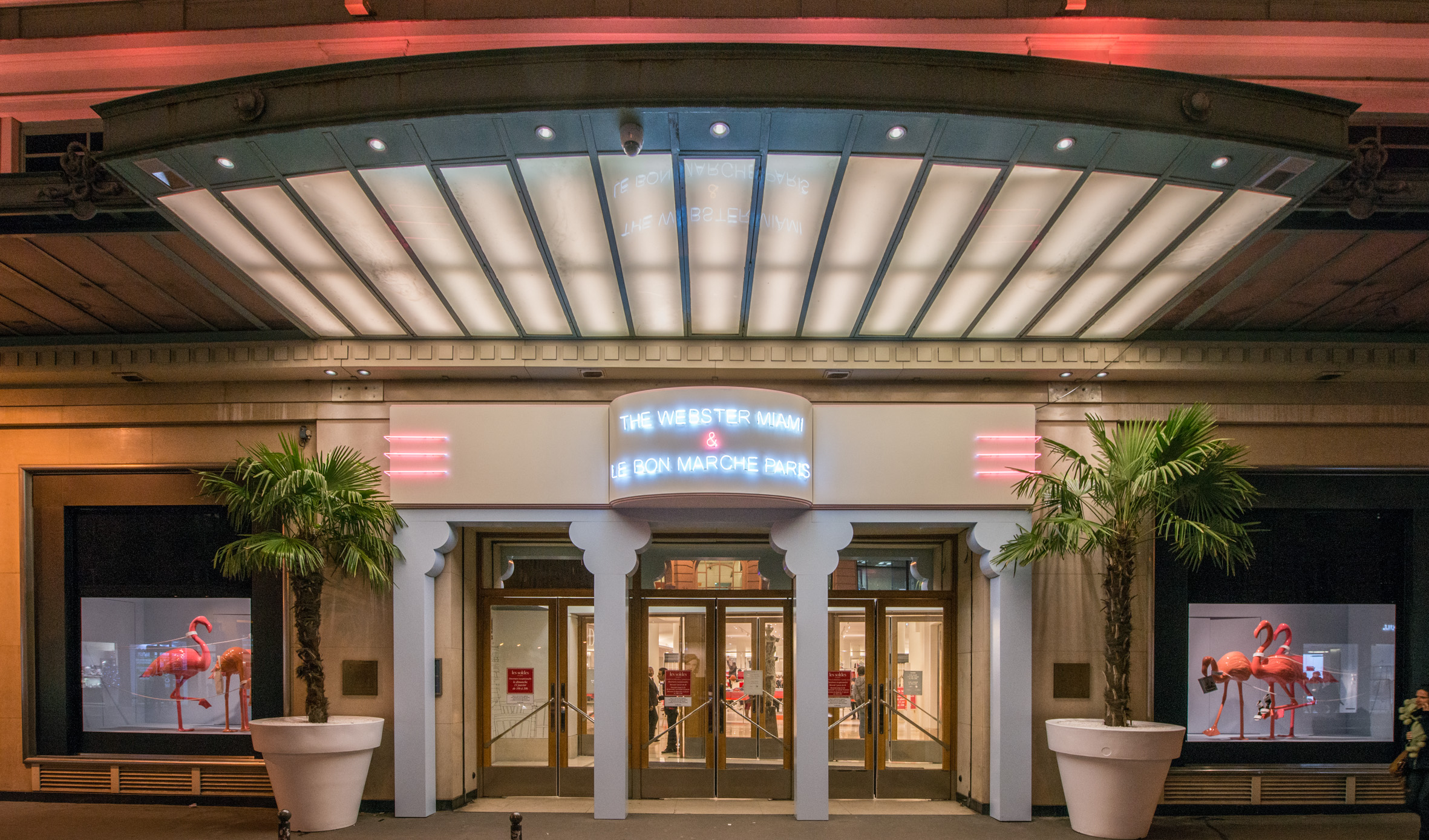
The Bon Marché x The Webster

Over the course of its existence, The Webster has featured brands and designers including Alaïa, Balenciaga, Balmain, Berluti, Celine, Chanel, Delpozo, Marc Jacobs, Margiela, Off-White, Pierre Hardy, Sacai, Stella Jean, and Yves Saint Laurent.
