= Laure Hériard Dubreuil =

French businessperson

Laure Heriard Dubreuil
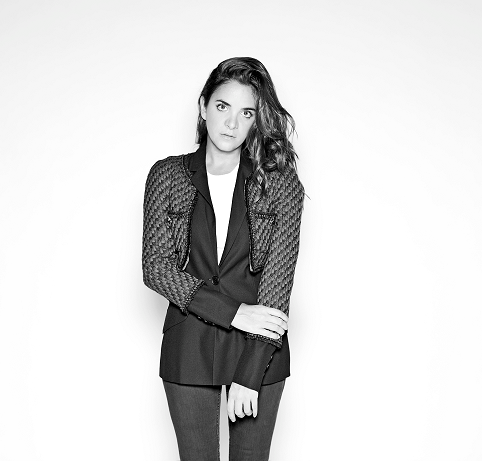
- Born: Paris, France
- Education: Fashion Institute of Technology
- Occupations: Entrepreneur; Business owner
- Known for: Founder and CEO of The Webster
- Spouse: Aaron Young
- Website: www.thewebster.us

Laure Heriard Dubreuil is a French entrepreneur and the founder and CEO of The Webster. The Webster is a luxury multi-brand retailer operating thirteen physical stores in the U.S. and an online store. Prior to founding The Webster, Heriard Dubreuil worked in merchandising for both Balenciaga and Yves Saint Laurent.

== Early life and education ==
Heriard Dubreuil grew up in Paris, France, 13 September 1977. as a member of the family that produces Rémy Martin cognac. She went to Sainte Marie de Neuilly highschool. She attended Paris Dauphine University, where she studied economics and Mandarin at Institut National des Langues et Civilisations Orientales. She became fluent in Mandarin and spent time in Shanghai as part of her Far East Studies. In the late 90s, she decided to attend New York City's Fashion Institute of Technology (FIT) where she earned a degree in Merchandising.

== Career ==
After graduating from FIT, Heriard Dubreuil returned to France where she worked as a merchandiser alongside Nicolas Ghesquière at Balenciaga and, later, alongside Stefano Pilati at Yves Saint Laurent. In 2007, she decided to move to Miami to open The Webster Miami. The shop features items from a number of prominent brands including Balmain, Azzedine Alaïa, Pierre Hardy, and Céline. The shop itself is housed in a renovated 1939 Art Deco building designed by Henry Hohauser on Collins Avenue in Miami Beach.

In 2012 Heriard Dubreuil facilitated a partnership between retailer Target and The Webster to become a part of "The Shops at Target" brand. In December 2013, The Webster opened a second location at the Bal Harbour Shops in Miami Beach. In January 2015, Heriard Dubreuil helped design an all-white capsule collection with French department store Le Bon Marché owned by LVMH. The collection was created for Le Bon Marché's annual "month of white" and features designers like Louis Vuitton, Marc Jacobs and Victoria Beckham. The collection was sold exclusively at The Webster and Le Bon Marché. The Webster's fourth location in South Coast Plaza, Costa Mesa, California opened in September 2016. This was followed by the fifth in SoHo, New York City, in November 2017. Measuring approximately 12,000 square feet, the building, which dates to 1878, features six stories, including a penthouse and a David Mallett salon.From 2020-2025, The Webster opened eight more locations in the following locations Los Angeles at Beverly Center (January 2020) designed by architect Sir David Adjaye, Montecito in luxury hotel Rosewood Miramar Beach (July 2021), Toronto, the first international outpost for The Webster in the Yorkville neighborhood (November 2021), Palm Springs in downtown Design District (April 2023), New Jersey at The Shops at Riverside (October 2023), Atlanta at Lenox Square (October 2024), Austin at The Domain (April 2025) and lastly Las Vegas at the Fontainebleau Las Vegas (April 2025). Today, The Webster is home to over 100 brands.

On 29 November 2017 Heriard Dubreuil launched her debut collection of her new line, LHD. The upper contemporary label offers ready-to-wear clothing and accessories. LHD sells exclusively at lhd.us,thewebster.us, and The Webster boutiques.

Heriard Dubreuil has been a frequent participant in and proponent of the Art Basel Art Fair in Miami Beach. Laure has participated in the WWD's annual CEO Summit, currently serves on the expert committee of LVMH's annual fashion prize which fosters young talent and recognized by Business of Fashion, for many years, among their top BoF 500: The People Shaping The Global Fashion Industry. Laure was a member of the fashion jury for the 32nd Fashion and photography festival at Hyères and most recently a judge for the Vogue Mexico 'Who's on Next' competition in 2018. In 2015 Laure became an ambassador of mothers 2 mothers, a global not-for-profit organization leading efforts in Sub Saharan Africa to end pediatric AIDS, ensuring good health and wellbeing for everyone, and achieving gender equality. In 2022, She was honored by her alumni of FIT by being the commencement speaker for their Spring Graduation. She has spoken on many panels including Harvard Business School's Retail Summit in November of 2023 and has been a returning panel and judge at the Latin American Fashion Summit over the last few years. Laure most recently a juror for SCAD's School of Fashion Senior Thesis program.

== Personal life ==
Heriard Dubreuil is married to contemporary artist Aaron Young and they have two children.
