= Yaroslava Boyko =

Yaroslava Boyko may refer to:

1. Birth name of Yaroslava Plaviuk (1926–2023), a figure in the Ukrainian women's movement
2. Yaroslava Yuriyivna Boyko, Ukrainian public figure
