= Stanley Whitman =

American real estate developer

Stanley Finch Whitman
- Born: November 15, 1918; Evanston, Illinois, United States
- Died: May 24, 2017 (aged 98)
- Education: Duke University
- Occupation: Real Estate Developer
- Known for: Bal Harbour Shops
- Spouse: Dottie Stivers
- Children: Randall Whitman; Gwen Whitman Lazenby
- Parent(s): William and Leona E. Whitman
- Website: balharbourshops.com

Stanley Whitman (November 15, 1918 - May 24, 2017) was an American real estate developer best known for developing Bal Harbour Shops, an open-air shopping mall in Bal Harbour, Florida, a suburb of Miami Beach, Florida. Whitman also helped to incorporate Bal Harbour Village, at the north end of the Miami Beach barrier island, in 1946.

== Early life and education ==
Stanley Finch Whitman was born on November 15, 1918, in Evanston, Illinois, to William and Leona Whitman, and grew up in Miami Beach, Florida. William owned a printing company in Chicago and developed real estate properties in the Miami area.

In the 1920s, William and Leona developed real estate destinations in Miami Beach, including Española Way, properties on Lincoln Road and much of the ocean frontage on Collins Avenue between 29th and 44th Street. They also developed Whitman-by-the-Sea, the first hotel built on Miami Beach after the 1926 Miami Hurricane. In 1930, Leona became a founding member of the exclusive Surf Club. In the 1950s, she sold the property that later became Fontainebleau Miami Beach to Ben Novack.

Whitman and his brothers, Bill and Dudley, were raised in a single-family home on the oceanfront side of Collins Avenue at 32nd Street, the current site of the Faena Hotel Miami Beach. He graduated from Ida M. Fischer High School, and enrolled at Duke University in 1936. Whitman's father died of a heart failure on November 25, 1936, at the age of 77. His mother, Leona, sold the Chicago printing business and invested most of the proceeds into Florida real estate, including properties on Lincoln Road and mid-Miami Beach oceanfront properties.

At Duke, Whitman met his future wife, Dottie Stivers. After graduating during World War II, he served as a U.S. Navy officer, based in Miami Beach, overseeing a fleet of submarine chasers. He was honorably discharged in 1945. After the war, he helped to incorporate the Bal Harbour Village.

== Bal Harbour Shops ==
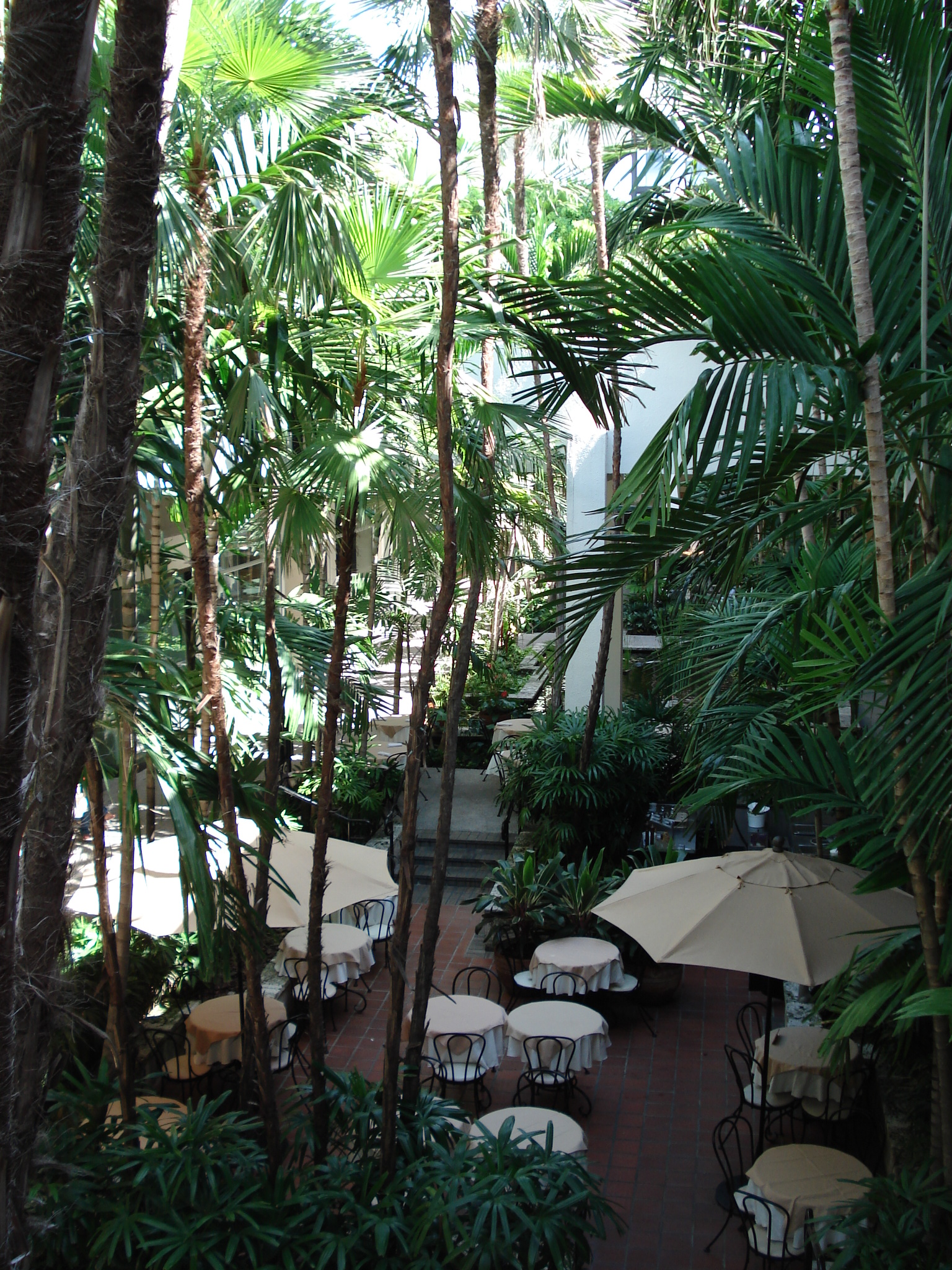
Bal Harbour Shops

Whitman was influenced by the peak glamour of Lincoln Road in the 1920s – the so-called "Fifth Avenue of the South" at that time – Whitman envisioned "Lincoln Road North" – a theater of shopping featuring the most luxury brands for the world's most affluent shoppers on 96th and Collins Avenue.

In 1951, The Broad Causeway opened providing better access to the mainland and bringing motorists directly to 96th Street; nearby luxury hotels were sprouting quickly, most notably the 467-room Americana in 1956, created by Bob Tisch and Larry Tisch.

In 1957, Whitman acquired the future Bal Harbour Shops location, 16 acres of land on the corner of 96th and Collins Avenue, for $2 per square foot, then a record price for retail property. Some critics at the time mocked the high price and called it, “Whitman’s Folly.”

Whitman first hired architect Victor Gruen, but soon fired him and hired Herb Johnson, based in Miami. They developed an open-air shopping center with shade trees – going completely against the conventional wisdom of enclosed, air-conditioned malls. Instead, they built a two-story structure with balconies and open air “streets” with tropical foliage, sculptures, fountains and koi ponds – as well as palm trees for shade in parking lots. Whitman wanted to make Bal Harbour Shops to feel as exclusive as a private club; there would be no supermarkets, convenience stores or discount stores. Shoppers were even required to pay for parking – although parking was discounted with validation from any of the shops.

On November 26, 1965, the shopping center opened with stores including FAO Schwarz, Abercrombie & Fitch and Martha's, considered one of the most influential international women’s salons hosting fashion shows with designers Valentino and Oscar de la Renta, both of whom would later open boutiques at BHS. In 1971, Neiman Marcus opened as an anchor tenant at the north end of the Bal Harbour Shops complex – its first store ever outside of Texas.[6] In November 1976, Saks Fifth Avenue opened a 75,000 square foot store to anchor the southern end of the Bal Harbour Shops complex. Early European Designer store openings included Yves Saint Laurent, Gucci, Cartier, Versace and Chanel.

In 1982, Bal Harbour Shops was the first shopping center planned for vertical expansion to add 100,000 square feet of retail space on Level 2.

In 1983, a second level was added. Overall sales rose from $1,000 per square foot in 1997, 5 times the national average, to $2,000 per square foot in 2008, and to $3,000 per square foot in 2015, and $3,400 per square foot through the end of the first quarter of 2022.

In 2012, the International Council of Shopping Centers named Bal Harbour Shops the world's top-producing shopping center, based on annual sales per square foot.

Notable retailers and restaurants include Salvatore Ferragamo, Alexander McQueen, Audemars Piguet, Balenciaga, Balmain, Bottega Veneta, Brioni, Bvlgari, Chanel, Chloé, Chopard, Dolce & Gabbana, Fendi, Golden Goose, Goyard, Graff, Gucci, Harry Winston, James Perse, Missoni, Miu Miu, Prada, Richard Mille, Rolex, Saint Laurent, Stella McCartney, Tiffany & Co., Tod's, Van Cleef & Arpels, Versace, Zegna, Zimmermann, Makoto, Le Zoo, Carpaccio and Hillstone. The anchor stores are Neiman Marcus and Saks Fifth Avenue.

=== Expansion plans ===
In 2012, the Whitman family struck a land swap deal with Church by the Sea to further expand Bal Harbour Shops by over 200,000 square feet. Bal Harbour Shops agreed to build a 60,000-square-foot (5,600 m^{2}) church.

In January 2013, Bal Harbour Shops announced an equity partnership with Swire Properties to jointly develop the 500,000-square-foot (46,000 m^{2}) retail component of Brickell CityCentre in downtown Miami.

In 2017, the $550 million enhancement plan was approved to add 241,600 square feet (22,450 m^{2}) of new retail space and restaurants to Bal Harbour Shops with a completion date of 2024.

== Philanthropy ==
Whitman served the Bal Harbour community as president of the Bal Harbour Rotary Club, head of the Bal Harbour Resort Tax Committee and as an active member of the Interama Chamber of Commerce. He served as Chairman of the Board of the Miami Dade Water and Sewage Authority, and Chairman of the South Florida Highway Users Federation. In 1972, the Interana Chamber of Commerce named Whitman its Man of the Year.

In the 1990s, Miami-Dade County Mayor Alex Penelas honored Whitman "for contributions which serve to enrich the fabric of the community."

Whitman made contributions to his community by supporting charities such as the Buoniconti Fund to Cure Paralysis and the University of Miami's Miller School's Project: New Born.

== Awards and recognition ==
In 2013, Whitman received the Urban Land Institute Lifetime Achievement Award.

In recognition of his philanthropy and civic engagement, Miami-Dade County recognized "Stanley F. Whitman Day" in 1998 and The Village of Bal Harbour followed suit in 2015.

In 2016, Whitman received the Miami Beach Chamber of Commerce Lifetime Achievement Award.

== Family ==
Whitman married Dottie Stivers, who died in 2008. He had a son, Randall, Chairman of Whitman Family Development; a daughter, Gwen Whitman Lazenby; a grandson, Matthew Whitman Lazenby, President and CEO; three other grandchildren; and three great-grandsons.
