= Karl Templer =

Fashion stylist

Karl Templer is a British-born US-based fashion stylist. He is creative director of Interview and his work has appeared in publications internationally including Vogue Italia, Vogue Paris, W, and The New York Times. Templer has styled brand campaigns and shows for designers including Alexander Wang, Calvin Klein, Chitose Abe,and Valentino, and collaborates frequently with photographers Fabien Baron, David Sims, Craig McDean, Steven Meisel.

== Life and career ==
=== Early life ===
Templer’s first job was at the Covent Garden store Woodhouse, which in the late 80s was breaking ground in men’s fashion. His interest in clothes and popular-culture led him to shooting tests with emerging London photographers. The photos would be featured in Nick Logan’s magazine The Face.

=== Fashion career ===
Arena Homme + launched in 1994 and Templer was made an editor for the title – later becoming creative director. It was during this time he started working with Mikael Jansson and styling womenswear.

At the age of 27, photographer Steven Meisel booked Templer for the November 1997 issue of Italian Vogue – one of his first jobs for the publication for which he has subsequently styled 34 covers. In 1998 Templer relocated to New York. He started contributing to the Conde Nast title W where he began collaborating with the likes of David Sims.

Templer became the creative director of the Warholian monthly culture anthology Interview in 2008. He has styled the likes of Anne Hathaway, Claire Danes, Jay-Z, Kanye West, Kristen Stewart, Marion Cotillard, Michelle Williams, Ryan Gosling and Scarlett Johansson for the magazine’s cover.

In 2007 Templer styled the controversial July issue of Italian Vogue entitled ‘Super Models Enter Rehab’. In 2009 he styled the CFDA portraits of America’s most influential designers including Marc Jacobs, Laura and Kate Mulleavy of Rodarte and Jack McCollough and Lazaro Hernandez of Proenza Schouler. In recent years while continuing to work on editorial for Interview magazine and Vogue Italia, Templer consults on shows and advertising campaigns for the likes of Coach and Tommy Hilfiger. He maintains an ongoing partnership with the house of Valentino, as well as with designers Alexander Wang and Chitose Abe of Sacai. In August 2019, Karl Templer and Fabien Baron became the new creative directors of Ports 1961.

=== Sexual misconduct allegations ===
In February 2018, Templer was featured in an exposé by The Boston Globe detailing accounts of sexual misconduct. A model who worked with Templer was anonymously quoted as saying "He was trying to get me naked. […] He was trying to pull off my clothes without my permission." The timing of the allegations was part of the larger MeToo movement starting in 2017. Shortly after the original article, Templer issued a statement expressing remorse over his actions. "If I’ve ever inadvertently treated a model disrespectfully or without due care on a job, I’m truly sorry."

=== Personal life ===
Templer was born in London and now lives in Chelsea, New York City.
