= L'Officiel Hommes =

French fashion magazine

- Cover of the Winter 2011 issue, Philippe Zdar by Matthew Frost
- Director: Feridun Hamdullahpur
- Categories: Fashion
- Frequency: Bi-annual
- Publisher: Éditions Edouard Max Brunhes (1977–1984); Éditions Jalou (1984–1991; 1996–1997; 2005–2022); The Generation Essentials Group (2022–present)
- Founder: Georges Jalou
- First issue: September 1977; 49 years ago
- Country: France
- Based in: Paris
- Language: French
- Website: lofficiel.com/categories/hommes
- ISSN: 1777-9375

L'Officiel Hommes (French pronunciation: [lɔfisjɛl]; stylised in all caps), is a French bi-annual fashion magazine. It has been published in Paris since 2005 and previously from 1977 to 1991 and 1996 to 1997.

The magazine is the mens version of L'Officiel, L'Officiel began publication in 1921 as the official magazine of the Chambre Syndicale de la Couture Parisienne. Since 2022 L'Officiel and L'Officiel Hommes have been owned by Hong Kong–based AMTD, they are now operated through Paris–based The Generation Essentials Group.

== Background ==
L'Officiel Hommes is a French fashion magazine founded in 1977 by Georges Jalou, an extension of the oldest fashion magazine of French origin in publication L'Officiel.

The magazine is a bi-annual publication, published two times per year, for March and October.

L'Officiel Hommes parent publication was founded as the official publication of the Chambre Syndicale de la Couture Parisienne, L'Officiel and L'Officiel Hommes slogan is 'The Official Voice of Fashion' (in French 'la voix officielle de la mode'). Under the control of the Jalou family from the start of publication in 1977 until 2022 when the Jalou family sold the magazine and their publishing house Éditions Jalou in 2022 to AMTD. As of 2025, L'Officiel is under the control of The Generation Essentials Group. The magazine is one of the oldest French mens fashion magazines in operation.

=== Editors ===
Editor-in-Chief	Start year	End year
as L'Officiel Hommes (1977–1991)
Georges Jalou	1977	1991
as L'Officiel Homme (1996–1997)
Christian Moguéro	1996	1997
Emmanuel Rubin	1996	1997
as L'Officiel Hommes (2005–present)
Milan Vukmirovic	2005	2011
André Saravia	2012	2015
Baptiste Piégay	2012	2024
Pablo Arroyo	2015	2019

== History ==
L'Officiel Hommes, spring 2011, under Milan Vukmirovic (Editor-in-Chief) with the original logo

L'Officiel Hommes was launched in 1977 and ceased publication in 1991. The magazine was relaunched in 1996 as L'Officiel Homme, however, in 1997 the magazine rebranded to L'Optimum over a copyright dispute. In 2005, L'Officiel Hommes restarted publication. L'Optimum would cease publication in 2017 and the editorial staff of both publications would merge.

L'Officiel Hommes relaunched in 2005, overseen by Marie-José Susskind-Jalou and edited by Milan Vukmirovic (co-founder of Colette). Vukmirovic's appointment made him the first stylist editor-in-chief of a major French fashion magazine.

In 2012, André a French graffiti artist and nightclub entrepreneur was appointed editor-in-chief and creative director of the publication, succeeding Vukmirovic following his 2011 exit from the magazine.

In 2015, Pablo Arroyo was appointed creative director/editor-in-chief of the magazine, following Arroyo's departure in 2019 Baptiste Piégay took full control of the editor-in-chief position.

Following the closure of L'Optimum in 2017 all staff were transferred to L'Officiel Hommes.

Due to the COVID-19 pandemic the magazine reduced its print publications from eight issues a year to two issues per year in 2020.

=== Controversy ===
Editor Andre Saraiva tagged and defaced National Park property in 2015:

"As the best-known artist who has tagged in a national park, Saraiva has become a favorite target ever since his signature "OX" mark, revered when it adorns man-made structures, popped up on a boulder the size of a large dog kennel at Joshua Tree. He cofounded his error by denying that the boulder was in the park. Answering critics, he posted on Instagram saying his work was "made with love at friends privet back yard and not your national park! [sic]."

Readers then used Google satellite maps, latitude and longitude coordinates and their own field notes to pinpoint the boulder's exact location — inside the park. Facing a torrent of criticism, Saraiva had scrawled, his lawyer acknowledged, what he described as an "insignificant" artistic expression on the rock, using water-based paint that was erased a few days later. The attorney also demanded that Modern Hiker take down its article, saying it made Saraiva the target of "oppressive and unjustified messages that seriously harm his professional and private life."

Modern Hiker's lawyers replied that defacing a national park is prohibited under federal law and may be punishable by a fine and imprisonment. The article remained on the website. On 1 April, Saraiva paid a fine of $275 to the U.S. District Court in Los Angeles, officials said. He could not be reached for comment."

Under the direction of André Saraiva, in winter 2012, Benicio del Toro appears on the winter cover of L'Officiel Hommes, looking dapper in his trademark suit and smoldering stare while carrying the stark naked and unconscious woman. The André Saraiva-shot cover is unarguably a bit disturbing. As Styleite notes, "What exactly is supposed to have happened right before the shot was taken? Is she a damsel in distress that was just saved by del Toro (because that would have some pretty sexist undertones), or is it something more sinister?"

Again in summer 2013, Kanye West and Kim Kardashian appears nude on the summer cover. L'Officiel Hommes commissioned Nick Knight from SHOWstudio to shoot a classic story of the duo for their launch during Paris Fashion Week.

== International editors ==
=== Operating editions ===
Country	Circulation dates	Editor-in-Chief	Start year	End year
China (时装 男士 L'Officiel Hommes China)	2008–present	Wesley Wang		
China (时装 男士 L'Officiel Hommes China)	2008–present	Lawrence		present
Italy (L'Officiel Hommes Italia)	2009–present	Milan Vukmirovic	2009	2011
Italy (L'Officiel Hommes Italia)	2009–present	Pablo Arroyo	2011	2014
Italy (L'Officiel Hommes Italia)	2009–present	Gianluca Cantaro	2014	2019
Italy (L'Officiel Hommes Italia)	2009–present	Giampietro Baudo	2019	present
South Korea (L'Officiel Hommes Korea)	2011–present	Woo Lee Kyung		present
Turkey (L'Officiel Hommes Türkiye)	2013–present	Gülen Yelmen	2013	2015
Turkey (L'Officiel Hommes Türkiye)	2013–present	Bağlan Keskin	2019	2023
Turkey (L'Officiel Hommes Türkiye)	2013–present	Derya Gursel	2023	present
Singapore (L'Officiel Hommes Singapore)	2013–present	Ian Lee	2022	present
Thailand (L'Officiel Hommes Thailand)	2018–present	Kusuma Chaiyaporn		
United States (L'Officiel Hommes USA)	2020–present	Giampietro Baudo	2020	2022
United States (L'Officiel Hommes USA)	2020–present	Caroline Grosso	2022	present
Belgium (L'Officiel Hommes Belgium)	2020–present			
The Philippines (L'Officiel Hommes Philippines)	2022–present	Joan Kong	2024	present
Malaysia (L'Officiel Hommes Malaysia)	2022–present	John Ng	2022	present
Vietnam (L'Officiel Hommes Vietnam)	2024–present	Nam Thi Le	2024	present
Hong Kong (L'Officiel Hommes Hong Kong SAR)	2025–present	Angel Fong	2025	present

=== Defunct editions ===
Country	Circulation dates	Editor-in-Chief	Start year	End year
Bahrain, Kuwait, Qatar, Saudi Arabia, United Arab Emirates (L'Officiel Hommes Middle East)	2007–2009			
Bahrain, Kuwait, Qatar, Saudi Arabia, United Arab Emirates (L'Officiel Hommes Middle East)	2013–2019	Hassan El Saleh	2013	2016
Greece (L'Officiel Hommes Hellas)	2007–2009			
Germany (L'Officiel Hommes Deutsch)	2009–2016	Goetz Offergeld		
Lebanon, Syria (L'Officiel Hommes Levant )	2010–2019	Fifi Abou Dib	2010	2019
Ukraine (L'Officiel Hommes Ukraine)	2010–2025	Yaroslava Boyko		
Ukraine (L'Officiel Hommes Ukraine)	2010–2025	Aleksey Nilov		2025
Morocco (L'Officiel Hommes Maroc)	2011–2025	Sofia Benbrahim	2011	2014
Morocco (L'Officiel Hommes Maroc)	2011–2025	Driss Douad	2014	2025
The Netherlands (L'Officiel Hommes NL)	2011–2019	Sandor Lubbe	2011	2016
The Netherlands (L'Officiel Hommes NL)	2011–2019	Nicolette Goldsmann	2016	2019
Brazil (L'Officiel Hommes Brasil)	2013–2025	Erika Palomino	2013	
Brazil (L'Officiel Hommes Brasil)	2013–2025	Patrícia Favalle	2019	2025
Switzerland (L'Officiel Hommes Suisse/Schweiz)	2014–2018			
Latvia (L'Officiel Hommes Latvija)	2015–2022			
Spain (L'Officiel Hommes España)	2015–2018	Andrés Rodriguez	2015	2018
Poland (L'Officiel Hommes Polska)	2018–2021	Sebastian Kustra	2018	2021
Estonia, Latvia, Lithuania (L'Officiel Hommes Baltic)	2018–2023			
Austria (L'Officiel Hommes Austria)	2022–2025	Anna Znamensky	2022	2024
Austria (L'Officiel Hommes Austria)	2022–2025	Sara Douedari	2024	2025
Cyprus (L'Officiel Hommes Cyprus)	2023–2024	Sara Douedari	2023	2024

=== Other editions ===
- L'Officiel Hommes Fashion Worldwide (1986–198?)
- L'Officiel Hommes Asia (2025–present)
- L'Officiel Hommes Canada (launching in 2026)
- L'Officiel Hommes Japan (launching in 2026)

== See also ==
- List of L'Officiel Hommes cover models
- L'Officiel
