= Clément Chabernaud =

French fashion model

- Born: 6 November 1989 (age 36); Paris, France
- Modeling information
- Height: 1.86 m (6 ft 1 in)
- Hair color: Dark blond
- Eye color: Blue
- Agencies: IMG Models (New York); Success Models (Paris); d'management group (Milan); Supa Model Management (London)

Clément Chabernaud (born 6 November 1989) is a French fashion model. He is currently ranked as one of the "Industry Icons" by models.com. In 2015, Vogue declared him as one of the 25 biggest male models of all time.

== Early life ==
Born in Paris, Chabernaud lived in Hong Kong, Casablanca and Seoul as a child. His parents were both teachers and had posts at French schools. Chabernaud had assumed that he would also become a teacher.

When Chabernaud was 16, a friend was being photographed for a French magazine and asked him to go along. Afterwards, Chabernaud thought modeling could be a good way to earn some extra money while he studied and began approaching agencies.

== Career ==
Chabernaud made his debut in 2005 at the spring Dior Homme show in Paris. In 2006, he became the face of Jil Sander and opened the spring 2007 Jil Sander show. In 2007, he opened the fall 2007 Jil Sander show in Milan and walked for Hermès, John Galliano, Sonia Rykiel, and Yves Saint Laurent in Paris.

Chabernaud has since walked for brands such as Prada, Michael Kors, Salvatore Ferragamo, Dolce & Gabbana, Gucci, Hugo Boss, Lacoste, Giorgio Armani, Bottega Veneta, Berluti and many others. He has featured in advertising campaigns for brands including Valentino, Prada, Roberto Cavalli, Bally, H&M, Hugo Boss, Gucci, and Balmain.

In 2009, Karl Lagerfeld photographed Chabernaud for the summer issue of VMan. In 2012, Chabernaud appeared in Vogue Hommes International, photographed by Willy Vanderperre. Chabernaud was featured in magazines such as French, Chinese, Italian, Korean, and Turkish editions of L'officiel Hommes, Esquire UK, i-D, Details, and British GQ Style.

== Personal life ==
From 2011 to 2014, Chabernaud was in a relationship with Spanish model Alejandra Alonso. His style icons are Serge Gainsbourg and his grandma.
