= Garrett Neff =

American model

- Born: Wilmington, Delaware, U.S.
- Occupation: Model
- Modeling information
- Height: 1.87 m (6 ft 1 1/2 in)
- Hair color: Brown
- Eye color: Blue/Grey: 44 (EU)
- Agency: IMG Models (Worldwide); Success Models (Paris); Elite Model Management (Milan); Sight Management Studio (Barcelona); Way Model Management (Sao Paulo)
- Website: katamaswim.com

Garrett Neff is an American model. He is known for his early work with Calvin Klein as the face of jeans, underwear and the Man fragrance. In 2015, Neff launched his swimwear line, Katama.

Neff is currently one of the top "Money Guys" on models.com as well as part of the "Next Generation" of "Industry Icons." In 2009, he was ranked No.5 by Forbes publications on their list of the most successful male models of 2009.

== Early life ==
Neff was born in Wilmington, Delaware. He attended Wilmington Friends School where he was captain of both the varsity tennis and soccer teams. He also played club soccer for the Kirkwood Talons, making First Team All State as a senior in High School. Neff attended Bucknell University, where he played Division I tennis. He was a member of Kappa Delta Rho fraternity. He graduated in 2007 with a degree in Business Management.

== Career ==
In 2005, while returning from a trip to Barbados, Neff was discovered by a scouting agent at Miami International Airport. Shortly after, Neff signed to Click Model Management and began booking work for brands such Abercrombie & Fitch, Benetton, and Lagerfeld. In the years to follow, he appeared in GQ, V Man, L'Officiel Hommes, French Vogue, on the cover of Italian Vogue photographed by Steven Meisel and walked runways. By 2008, he was the face of Calvin Klein's Man fragrance.

In 2010, Neff appeared in the October 14th episode of "30 Rock" as "Young Jack." As of 2014, Neff is signed with IMG Models in New York, Success Models in Paris, and Sight Model Management in Barcelona.

Neff has appeared in campaigns for Swarovski, Carolina Herrera, Tommy Hilfiger and Hugo Boss. He has worked with the photographers Bruce Weber, Mario Testino, Steven Klein, Steven Meisel, Mert and Marcus, Peter Lindbergh and Milan Vukmirovic. In July 2015, Neff launched Katama, a brand of men's luxury swim and resort wear. The brand is heavily influenced by Neff's outdoor adventures with family in the Northeast combined with his knowledge of the global fashion market based on his experience in the industry.
