= Fabien Baron =

French director and editor (born 1959)

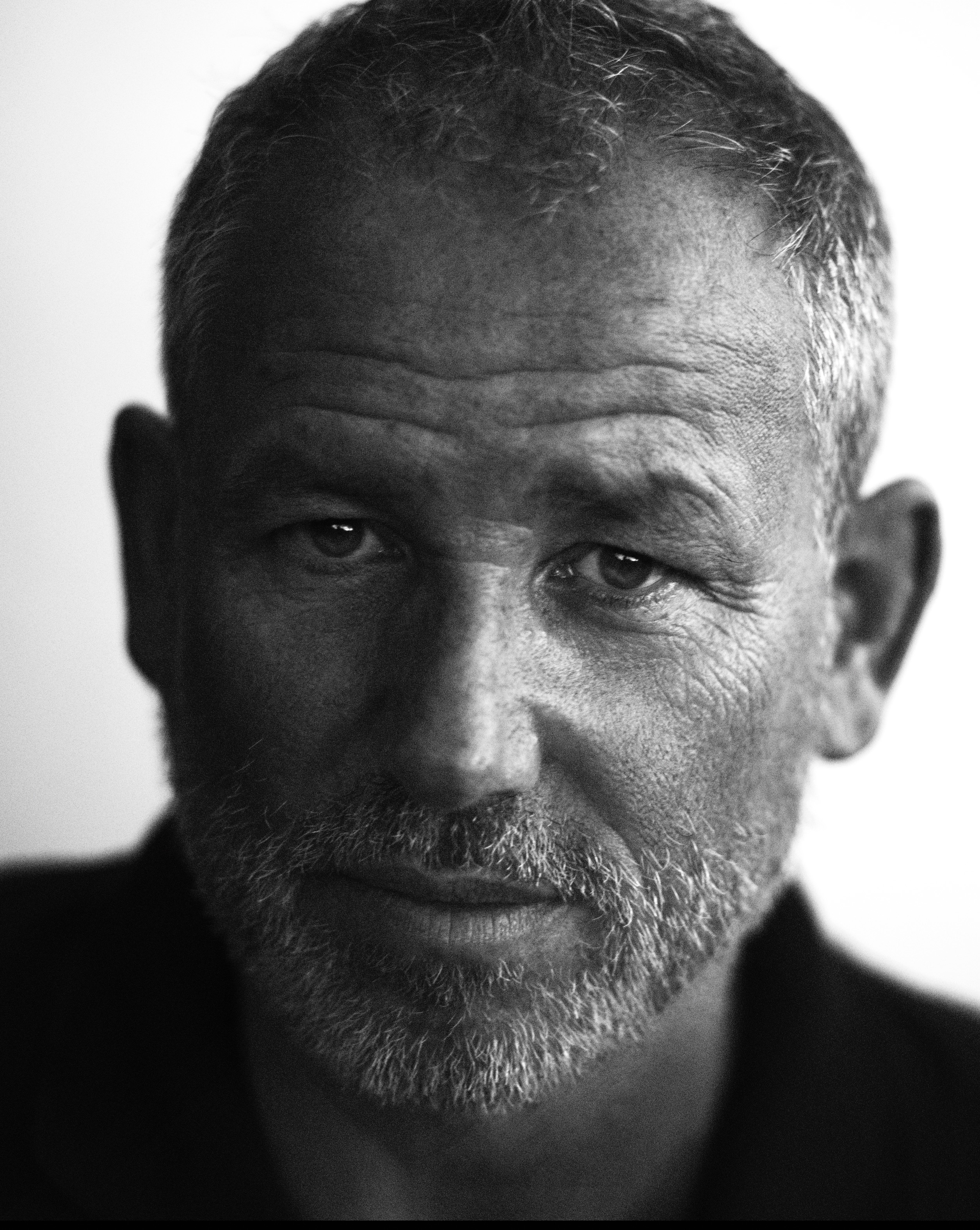
- Baron in 2014
- Born: July 5, 1959 (age 67); Antony, Hauts-de-Seine, France
- Education: École des Arts Appliqués
- Occupation: Director
- Years active: 1982-present
- Website: www.baron-baron.com

Fabien Baron (born July 5, 1959) is a French director, art director and magazine editor. He is best known for his iconic ad campaigns and work as editorial director of Andy Warhol's Interview magazine.

== Life and career ==
Baron was born on July 5, 1959, in Antony, Hauts-de-Seine, France, the son of a Parisian newspaper designer. Baron went to the École des Arts Appliqués where he studied design, sculpture and painting.

In 1982 Baron moved to New York and became an art director for Barneys.

Six years later, Baron went on to reinvent Italian Vogue under editor Franca Sozzani.

Baron joined Harper's Bazaar in 1992 as creative director working with editor-in-chief Liz Tilberis. He was brought on to revamp the magazine. According to UK's The Independent, Baron's work "took Bazaar's competitors by storm" and "created a truly distinctive look, clean, clear, elegant, modern." It was quickly dubbed "the world's most beautiful fashion magazine". That same year Baron began working with Calvin Klein for what would be the next 20 years as creative director for the brand.

Also that same year in 1992, Baron designed Madonna's Sex book photographed by Steven Meisel. Baron shot and directed the documentary, Sex featuring Madonna. The documentary was released alongside her album Erotica, Baron directed the music video for the title track that was banned by MTV.

Baron would continue to direct commercials for Calvin Klein, Giorgio Armani, Burberry, Givenchy, Yves Saint Laurent, Fendi and Guerlain and in 2003 joined Carine Roitfield at Vogue Paris, she brought him on as creative director to redesign the magazine and "it became perhaps the most influential fashion publication in the world."

In 2008, Baron was asked to become editorial director and re-envision Interview when Peter Brant took full control of the magazine. Baron's controversial first cover of a "silvery Kate Moss as the devil" in a studded face mask shot by Mert Alas and Marcus Piggott garnered attention. The "metallic" cover was an homage to The Factory, Warhol's New York studio. Interview made worldwide headlines in December 2013 for Claire Danes' topless cover photo, shot by Baron. The accompanying article was written by Dustin Hoffman. Baron's decision to put Kanye West on the cover in February 2014 stirred up controversy again with a raw blend of dark imagery and religious undertones shot by Steven Klein. West's cover story was written by Steve McQueen. Other notable Interview stories photographed by Baron include, "Honor" (November 2012), "Done Undone" (August 2013), "The Beauty Within", (September 2013), "Giorgio Armani la Femme Bleue", (March 2011), and "The Goddesses" from The Model Issue which released eight different covers, (September 2013).

In an interview with Charlie Rose, Baron talked about the magazine, "One thing about Interview that I really enjoy is to work with all these amazing people, all these amazing actors and being able to direct them… and have them on shoots and convince them to do things maybe they wouldn't do otherwise."

== Baron & Baron, Inc. ==
Baron is the founder and CCO of Baron & Baron, Inc., a boutique advertising agency specializing in fashion, fragrance and cosmetics luxury brands. He has "shaped the visual identities" of global brands like Calvin Klein, Givenchy, Fendi, and Michael Kors by creating the right mix of television, digital and print campaigns, product and packaging design. Baron creative directed the re-launch of Burberry and had a long stint working with Balenciaga during Nicolas Ghesquière's tenure. Baron has "created lucrative perfumes for half a dozen designers, including Giorgio Armani."

Baron began working with Calvin Klein in the early 1990s and creative directed the brand's first campaign for CKOne, featuring Kate Moss, shot by Steven Meisel. Baron designed the now iconic bottle for CKOne, the first "unisex" fragrance. "CKOne, A Fragrance for Everyone." Baron then directed the follow-up, CKOne ‘You're the One', working with his frequent collaborator, cinematographer Harris Savides to create a continuous camera move traveling through a house filled with futuristic 'it-kids' to reveal they were housed in a CKOne Bottle at the end.

In 2008 Baron directed a commercial for Calvin Klein's Secret Obsession fragrance featuring a nude Eva Mendes. U.S. TV networks refused to air without edit changes, and after revisions it still could not air on TV until after 9 p.m. Mendes was reportedly "thrilled" to be too "saucy" for TV.

In 2013 Calvin Klein aired its first Super Bowl ad. Baron directed the commercial that featured underwear model and the "young face of Calvin Klein", Matthew Terry, who became an overnight sensation. Later that year Baron collaborated with David Fincher on the Calvin Klein 'Downtown' Campaign featuring Rooney Mara.

In August 2019, Fabien Baron and Karl Templer became the new creative directors of Ports 1961.

== Influence ==
In an interview with Charlie Rose, Baron refers to the "old fashioned" education he received from his father, "… we were going to exhibits together.. we were looking at books and a lot of pictures.. the whole art history.. he taught me a lot.. so I had a very classic education in visual arts."

"My dad was doing more of the journalistic side of art direction, for newspapers, and I was really intrigued by the machine of it all, the pace. There were no computers at the time, just huge linotype machines that weighed tons and used metal plates. There was an adrenaline rush about it all."

== Reception ==
Baron has been called by Vanity Fair "the most sought-after creative director in the world."

== Career overview ==
- 1982: Art Director for Barneys New York.
- 1987: Art Director: New York Woman Magazine.
- 1988-1990: Italian Vogue. Art Director, under editor Franca Sozzani.
- 1990-1991: Interview Magazine, Art Director.
- 1990: Founded Baron & Baron, Inc.
- 1992: Harper's Bazaar Creative Director under editor-in-chief Liz Tilberis.
- 1992 Directed Madonna's 'Erotica' music video
- 1992 Directed 'Sex' Documentary featuring Madonna
- 2000–2002: Arena Homme Plus. Editor-in-chief and Design Director.
- 2001: Residential furniture line with Cappellini.
- 2002: Contract furniture line with Bernhardt Design.
- 2003-2008: French Vogue. Creative Director, under editor-in-chief, Carine Roitfeld.
- 2008: Interview Magazine. Co-Editorial Director
- 2009: Interview Magazine: Editorial Director
- 1990–Present: Founder of Baron & Baron

== Awards ==
- 25 FiFi awards for design and advertising from the Fragrance Foundation.
- 2 ASME awards of excellence for design and photography from the American Society of Magazine Editors.
- 2 TIME top ten covers of the year.
- 25 SPD gold and silver awards for art direction from the Society of Publication Designers.
- CFDA special award for influence in art direction from the Council of Fashion Designers of America.
- APPM 22nd annual Advertising Awards: 2006 "Le Grand Prix" for fragrance advertising.
