= Ports International =

Fashion house

Ports
- Type: Private
- Industry: Luxury Fashion; Retail
- Founded: 1961
- Founder: Luke Tanabe
- Headquarters: Toronto, Canada
- Area served: Worldwide
- Key people: Karl Templer (Artistic Director)
- Products: Luxury Goods
- Owner: Ports Design Ltd.
- Number of employees: over 5,000

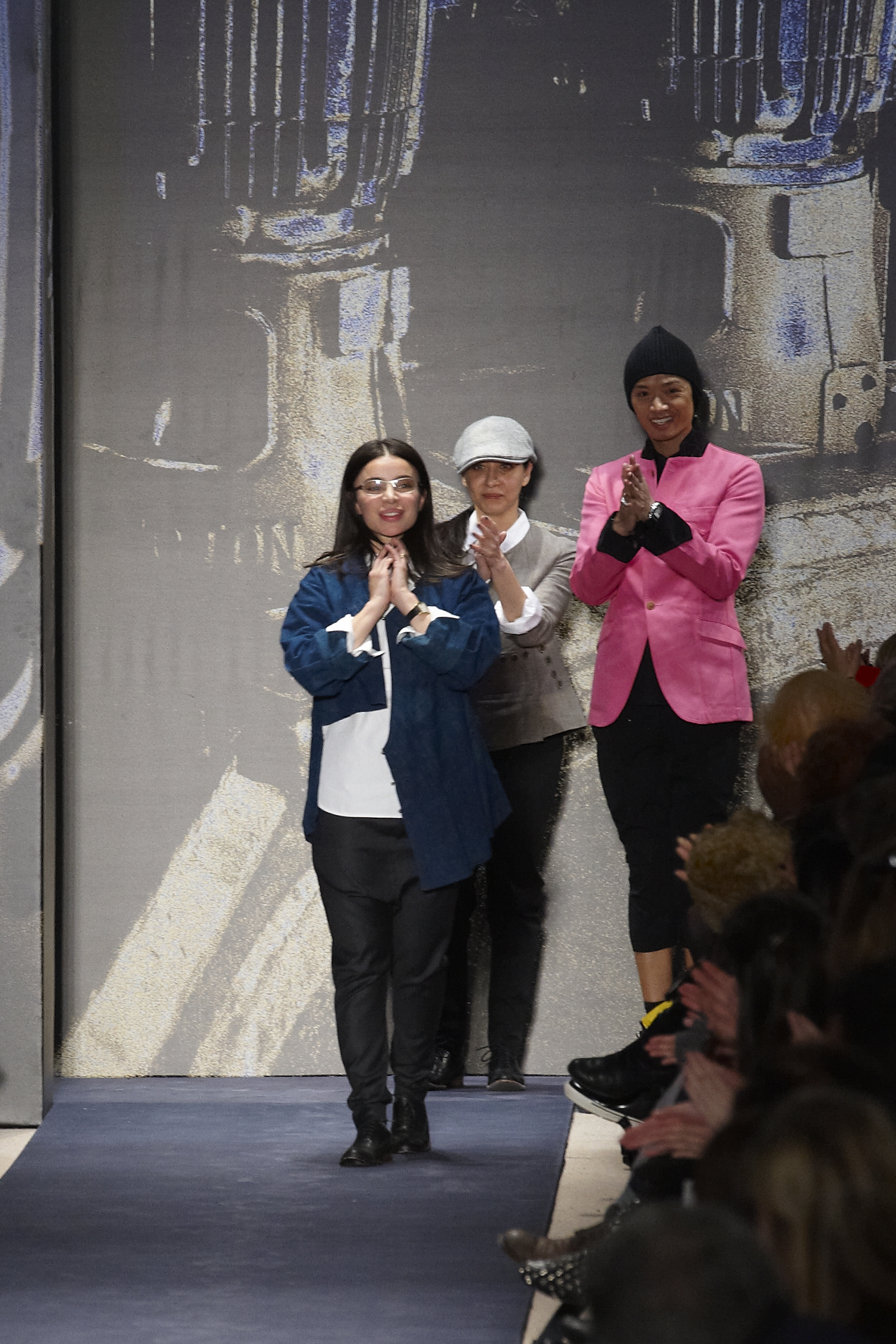
Tia Cibani (left) receives applause at the conclusion of her Ports 1961 Fall/Winter 2010 show at New York Fashion Week, February 2010.

Ports is an international luxury fashion house founded by Japanese Canadian fashion designer Luke Tanabe (1920–2009) in Toronto in 1961. It specializes in luxury women's and men's ready-to-wear as well as accessories. Acquired by Chinese Canadian brothers Alfred Chan and Edward Tan in 1989, Ports expanded into the Chinese market in the early 1990s where its parent company — which traded on the Hong Kong Stock Exchange from 2003 to 2018 and has since been privatized — now operates more than 300 retail stores. Sub-brands of the fashion house include Ports (International) in China and Asia as well as Ports 1969, with subsidiaries in Milan and New York City as well as a flagship store in Paris, for global distribution.

== History ==
The company was founded as Newport Canada in 1961 as an import business for clothing from Japan. It evolved into a women's fashion business with Vancouver-born Luke Tanabe, whose parents had been Japanese immigrants to Canada, as its designer and was renamed Ports International in 1966. In the 1970s, the company expanded in North America, later opening signature boutiques in international locations. In 1970, Ports opened its United States flagship store in Manhattan, followed by stores in Copley Place, Boston and Stanford Shopping Center in Palo Alto, California. Ports expanded to the United Kingdom, opening its London–based flagship on Bond Street in 1978, with additional boutique openings in Cambridge and Bath in 1979.

Ports design team personnel changes included the hiring of Tanabe's daughters Christine and Miki as designers in 1980, co-designers Dean and Dan Caten in 1988, as well as Fiona Cibani (* 1965) and Tia Cibani (* 1971) and — wife and sister-in-law, respectively, of the brand's later owner — as creative directors and chief designers in 1992.

In 1980, Tanabe had created Tabi International in Toronto, a Canadian store chain with more affordable clothing for women. Tanabe retired in 1989 and sold Ports and Tabi to Toronto-based Etac Sales Ltd. (ESL), which had been co-founded by Chinese-Canadian entrepreneur Alfred K.T. Chan (* 1947) and his brother Edward Tan. The brothers were born near Xiamen, fled with their families to Hong Kong as children and later immigrated to Canada.

ESL filed for bankruptcy in 1994. Alfred Chan re-acquired a Chinese apparel factory in Xiamen, two test stores in Shanghai and Xiamen, and long-term rights to the Ports brand in Asia and Australia as well as the Tabi brand name for 6 million CAD from ESL's receivers and eventually decided to sell all Ports retail operations in the US and the UK. Together with his brother, Chan brought the Ports brand as Ports 1961 to the Chinese market and opened the company's first mono-brand store in China in 1993. In 1994, Chan created Ports Design Ltd. with his wife Fiona Cibani in Xiamen and listed the company at the Hong Kong Stock Exchange (0589.HK) in 2003. Fiona Cibani had joined Ports' design department in 1989 and later married Alfred Chan, while her sister Tia joined Ports in 1990; both are of Italian-Libyan parentage and Canadian citizenship. Tabi International was liquidated in 2011, and the remaining 76 Tabi stores in Canada were closed. Xiamen-produced Ports was and is perceived by Chinese consumers as an attractive Western brand while retailing below European and American designer goods, a fact that the company, also by hiring advertising models such as Claudia Schiffer and Kate Moss, has used to its advantage.

In 2015, Ports Design Ltd. was renamed Portico International Holdings Ltd., based in Hong Kong and incorporated in Bermuda. The company traded on the Hong Kong Stock Exchange from 2003 to 2018 (code: 0589.HK). In May 2018, the company was acquired by its shareholder, Bluestone Global Holdings Ltd. — whose parent company in turn is Ports International Enterprises Ltd. in Hong Kong which belongs to Alfred Chan's and Edward Tan's PCD Group — and thus eventually delisted from the stock exchange. PCD Group operates more than 300 retail stores; most of them in over 50 cities in China. Other locations include Paris, Hong Kong and Macau. Among them are flagship stores for the various Ports fashion brands, see below. The vast majority of the group's subsidiaries incorporated in mainland China are wholly foreign owned enterprises.

=== Fashion lines ===
- Ports International (marketed as Ports) — womenswear, accessory and menswear lines for the Chinese and Asian market; stores in China
- Ports 1961 — womenswear runway collection for worldwide distribution; menswear line from 2011 to 2017; Paris flagship store
- Ports Pure — colorful fashion line for younger women in China since 2015; stores in China
- Ports V — marketed since 2018 as a progressive unisex line internationally and as a fashion line for younger men in China; flagship store in Shanghai

=== Ports 1961 ===
In 2004, Chan re-launched the Ports brand in North America as New York City-based Ports 1961 with designer Tia Cibani (*1973), Chan's wife Fiona's younger sister, presenting modern, minimalist and elegant womenswear lines. In April 2010, Tia Cibani stepped down as creative director of Ports 1961, and Fiona Cibani was named creative director of the label. In 2011, Ports 1961 operated stores in Montreal, Toronto, Vancouver, West Hollywood, Manhattan, Paris, London (shop-in-shop) and mainland China. Ports 1961 launched a fashion-forward menswear collection for the first time in 2011 with designers Fiona Cibani and Ian Hylton, though classic menswear collections from Ports had been available before. Ports 1961 womenswear collections were presented during New York Fashion Week; the menswear lines were shown at Milan Fashion Week. Also in 2011, Salem Cibani, brother of Tia and Fiona Cibani, who had joined the company in 2006 as global director of business development, was made CEO of Ports 1961. Beginning in 2013, the womenswear runway shows were also staged in Milan. In 2012, Ports 1961 moved its headquarters and production units from New York to Milan, Italy. By 2014, all Canadian Ports 1961 stores were closed.

Ian Hylton resigned in spring 2014. In mid-2014, Ports named French-Serbian designer Milan Vukmirovic, a former Gucci and Jil Sander employee, creative director of its menswear division. By the end of 2014, the Hong Kong-based Ports Design operation operated 310 retail stores, selling Xiamen-manufactured products under their own Ports International and Ports 1961 brands as well as BMW Lifestyle, Armani Collezioni, Armani Jeans, and Versace collections in license agreements. In December 2014, Natasa Cagalj was appointed women's creative director of Ports 1961. In September 2015, Ports 1961 opened its first US menswear-only store in Manhattan.

Starting in 2016, Ports 1961 showed its womenswear runway collections during London Fashion Week, and a Ports 1961 design studio was established under Caglj's direction in the British capital. For the spring 2016 men's collection, Ports 1961 partnered with the boxing brand Everlast. In 2017, Jenny Tan, daughter of Eward Tan, succeeded Salem Cibani as CEO of Ports 1961. In mid-2017, Ports 1961 was criticized for its misappropriate use of the Black Lives Matter (declining it to "Every Color Matters" and "Only Love Matters") during its spring 2018 menswear runway show in Milan. The Ports 1961 menswear line was discontinued in the end of 2017. The brand's retail store in New York's Meatpacking District closed in the same year. In mid-2018, a contemporary streetwear-inspired unisex line named Ports V was launched under Vukmirovic's direction.

In August 2019, Fabien Baron and Karl Templer became the new creative directors of Ports 1961, replacing Natasa Casalj who had left a few months earlier. Since then, the Ports 1961 designers "broke away from the chic, minimalist attitude that had characterized the label thus far" and offer collections that are "more youthful, playing with colors and with a unisex edge".

In early 2020, Ports 1961 returned to Milan Fashion Week with its womenswear runway collection. In May 2020, the company signed a 10-year deal with the Italian eyewear manufacturer Safilo Group for the Chinese market. The Paris store, within the building of the Mandarin Oriental Hotel, on Rue Saint-Honoré is currently the only remaining international location for the Ports 1961 brand; other stores are maintained in Beijing, Shanghai, Chengdu and Hong Kong.
