= André (artist) =

Swedish-French graffiti artist

- Born: André Saraiva; 2 July 1971 (age 55); Uppsala, Sweden
- Other names: Monsieur André; Monsieur A
- Occupations: Graffiti Artist; Hotelier; Restaurateur
- Years active: 1989–present
- Known for: Mr.A, a graffiti series that has run for thirty plus years
- Spouse: Uffie (2008—2009)
- Website: www.mrandre.com

André Saraiva (a.k.a. Monsieur André and Monsieur A) born 2 July 1971. Known mononymously as André, is a Swedish-French artist best known for his work in graffiti. Amongst his creations is Mr. A which he has painted across all six inhabited continents. His work has been featured in museums such as the MoCA as in feature films such as Exit Through the Gift Shop. As an entrepreneur, he owns restaurants, nightclubs such as Le Baron, and hotel chains such as Hotel Amour.

== Early life ==
André Saraiva was born on 2 July 1971 in Uppsala, Sweden, where his Portuguese parents had fled the military regime of Salazar. His mother was a translator and his father was a painter. André moved to Paris at the age of 10, and started graffiti art at the age of thirteen.

== Career ==
=== Artist ===
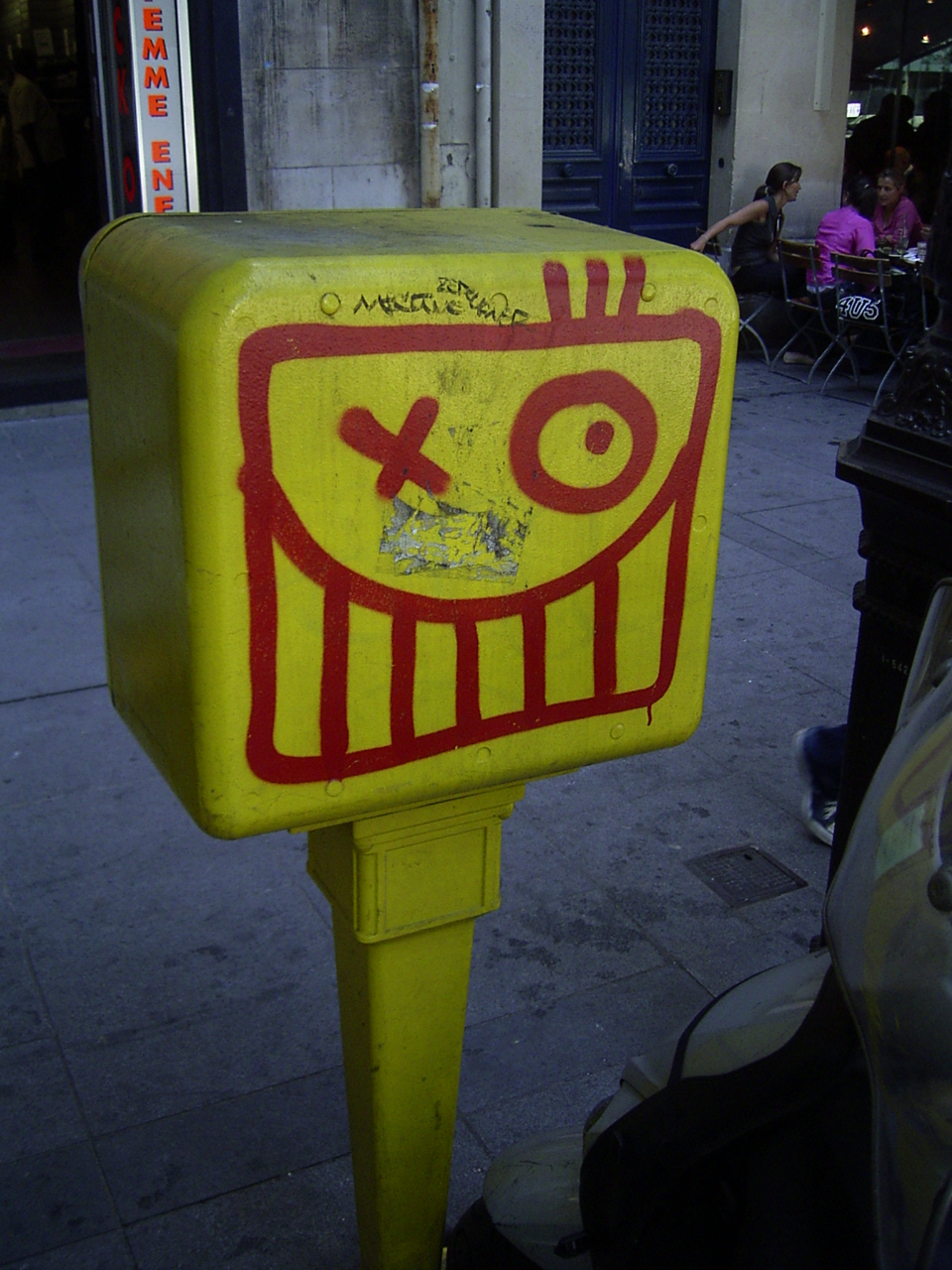
André in Paris

In 1986, André started tagging a top-hatted, stick figure character by the name of Mr. A on the streets of Paris, which earned him a reputation as a renowned graffiti artist. According to André, he has drawn approximately 300,000 Mr. A characters since the inception of his career.

André has been globally recognized for his work with graffiti. In 1989, André Saraiva won a competition organized by the French magazine L'Express. His graffiti spanned 3.20 by 2.15 metres (10.5 by 7.1 ft) of spray paint and stencils, which was selected among 25 other projects. He was featured on the cover of No. 2001 issue of L'Express. In 1997, he sold his paintings in a shop in Paris, from which he was spotted by Japanese patrons that brought him to the art scene of Tokyo.

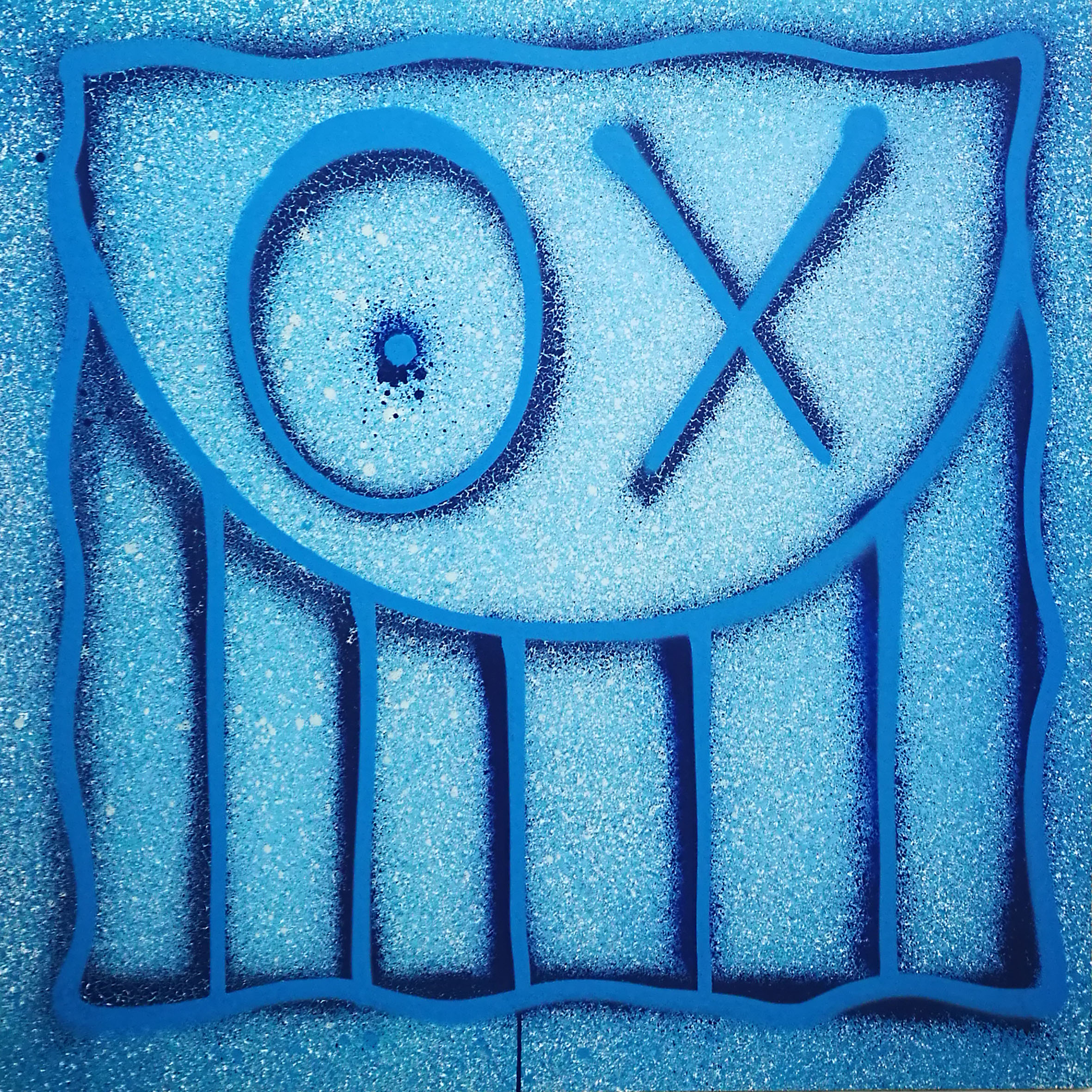
André Saraiva's graffiti

André's work has been exhibited in galleries and museums. In 2002, he opened the concept store "BlackBlock" in Paris at Palais de Tokyo; a creation around which he organized concerts, parades and other performances, and whose profits were reinvested in new projects art. In 2010, André appeared in Banksy's documentary Exit Through the Gift Shop. In 2011, he participated in MoCA Los Angeles' Art in the Streets exhibition. The same year, his work was also displayed at the Grand Palais, Paris and the 54th Venice Biennale. In 2014, a solo retrospective dedicated to his work was held at the Museu do Design e da Moda in Lisbon.

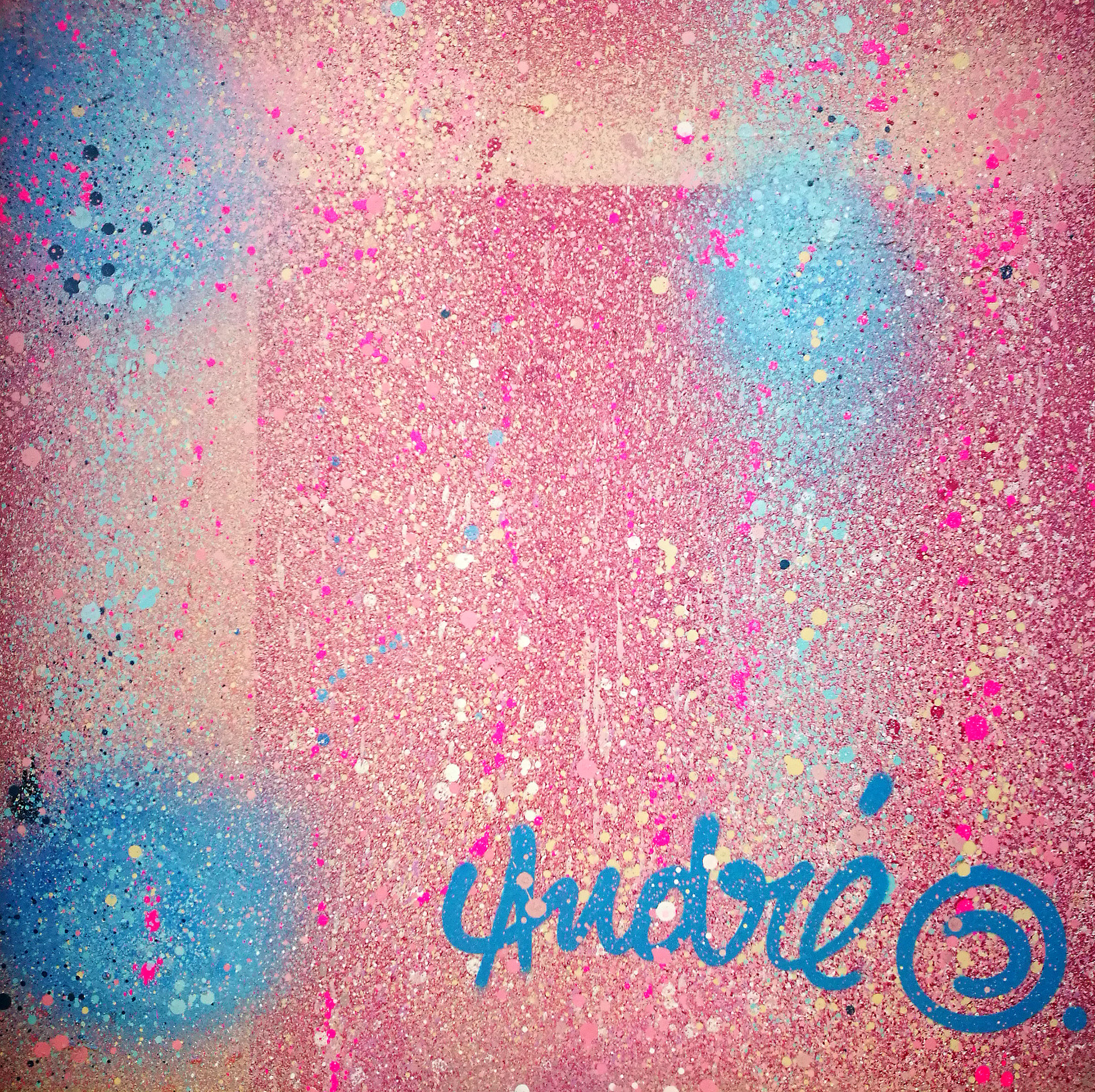
André Saraiva, Singnature,100cmX100cm

=== Entrepreneur ===
He has been commissioned to design luxury consumer goods, including goods made by Louis Vuitton, Apple, Chanel, Bally Shoe, Tiffany & Co, Sonia Rykiel, Levi's, Nike, Off-White and Converse. His likeness has been featured in global marketing campaigns.

Besides being a graffiti artist, André has served as the creative director and owner of clubs, hotels and restaurants in Paris, Tokyo, London, Los Angeles, New York City, Shanghai and St. Tropez.

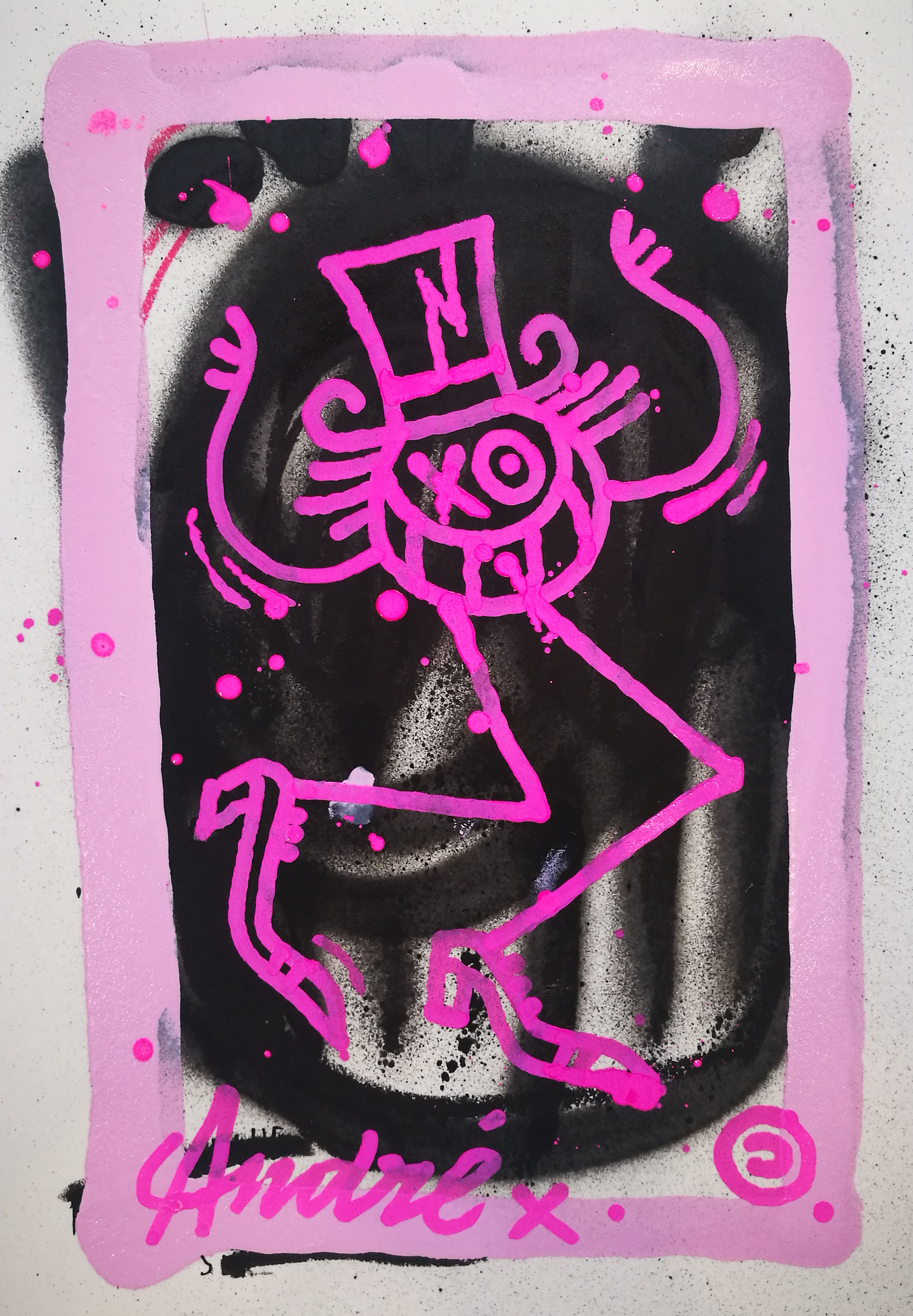
André Saraiva, Pink, 2017

From 2011 to 2015 he was the creative director for L'Officiel, a French fashion magazine.

In April 2020, André unveiled a collaboration with OnePlus, creating customized cases for the OnePlus 8 series.

=== Collaboration with Toy Manufacturer Mattel ===
In 2026, toy manufacturer Mattel announced the creation of the Fisher-Price Little People x André Saraiva set, collectible Little People dolls with faces designed by André, including his signature Mr. A.

== Conviction for vandalism of Joshua Tree National Park ==
On 1 April 2015 André was fined for vandalizing a boulder in Joshua Tree National Park, California. André posted photos of the graffiti on Instagram, and the website Modern Hiker and its readers aided the National Park Service in tracking down and identifying André's defacing of the boulder. Before the conviction, André attempted to silence the reporting with legal threats.

== Personal life ==
André was formerly married to French/American electro musician Uffie between 2008 and 2009.

== Filmography ==
- Cazals "Somebody Somewhere (Official Music Video), (2008) directed by André, starring Lou Doillon
- The Shoe (2011), directed by André
- Deadliest Catch (2012) directed by André
- New York La La La (2013) directed by André and Aaron Rose, for L'Officiel Hommes
- TV Baby "Wild Joy" (Official Music Video), (2013) directed by André
- Last Night at the Chelsea Hotel (2013), directed by André
- Rendez-Vous au Club Swan (2015), directed by André Saraiva, featuring Benjamin Millepied and Derek Blasberg

André is also an actor, known for For Lovers Only (2011) and Hora Sagrada (2007).
