= Casey Schreiner (blogger) =

American writer

Casey Schreiner is an American author and outdoor journalist. He runs the site Modern Hiker, where he writes trail guides on various hiking routes in Southern California. His blog is one of the most popular hiking blogs in the United States, ranking number 2 on USA Today's Best Hiking and Outdoors Blogs.

== Early life ==
Schreiner was born in Connecticut. He attended Boston University and is a screenwriter by trade.

== Career ==
Modern Hiker began as a personal outdoor blog. Schreiner's first post was on December 10, 2006. The blog began to pick up attention as he posted more articles and guides about Los Angeles-area trails. Schreiner has become somewhat of a public figure in the outdoors community, covering both local and national issues. He gained substantial public attention during his campaign to combat graffiti in national parks, including breaking national news with the story of Casey Nocket's vandalism spree across several National Parks in the American West. Schreiner also broke the national news story of graffiti artist Mr. André's vandalism of Joshua Tree National Park. Mr. André attempted to threaten Modern Hiker with legal action for outing his actions, but the threats were eventually dropped when Saraiva paid a fine to the park.

Schreiner is a frequent guest commentator on outdoor issues in Southern California, and is the author of "Day Hiking Los Angeles," a 348-page hiking guidebook published by Mountaineers Books in late 2016.

His second book "Discovering Griffith Park" was published by Mountaineers Books in May 2020. It is the first ever in-depth guidebook for Griffith Park and reached the Los Angeles Times' bestseller list.
