= Yaroslava Yuriyivna Boyko =

Ukrainian magazine director (born 1982)

Yaroslava Boyko
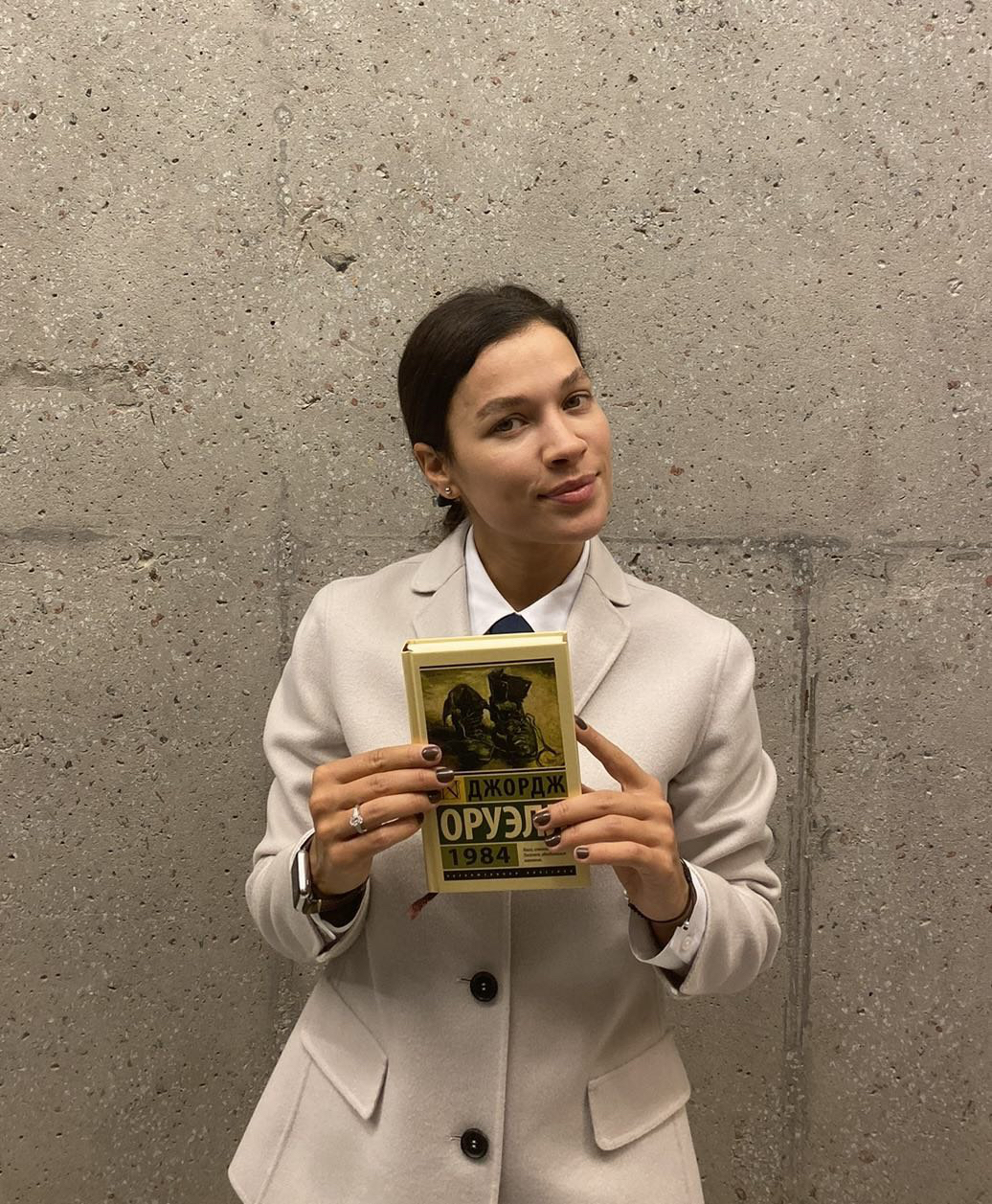
- Born: 30 September 1982 (age 43)
- Occupations: Magazine editor, public figure

Yaroslava Yuriyivna Boyko is a Ukrainian public figure, from 2015 to 2019 coordinator of the Kyiv Smart City initiative, creative director of L'Officiel Ukraine. She previously served as the editor-in-chief of L'Officiel Hommes Ukraine.

== Education ==
In 2020, Yaroslava Boyko completed her participation in the international project "Smart Cities: Shaping the Future," funded by the U.S. Department of State and implemented with the support of CRDF Global and the International Visitor Leadership Program (IVLP).

== L'Officiel Ukraine and Babylon Publishing House ==
Yaroslava Boyko began her career in 2003, working on organizing photoshoots for L'Officiel Ukraine magazine. In 2008 she held the position of Creative Director at Babylon Publishing House, also serving as Art Director of L'Officiel Ukraine.

Since 2015, Yaroslava Boyko has held the position of Publisher at Babylon Publishing House, taking on all managerial functions. She actively participates in the creation of all the magazines published by the house, including Pink, XXL, and L'Officiel Hommes Ukraine. As the Creative Director of the Ukrainian edition of L'Officiel Hommes, Boyko is responsible for developing and implementing the magazine's creative strategy, including content creation, visual design, and collaboration with key partners and brands. In 2019, Boyko became the Editor-in-Chief and Creative Director of L'Officiel Ukraine, implementing a series of reforms that significantly transformed the magazine's concept and enhanced its influence.

== Achievements ==
Under Yaroslava Boyko's leadership, L'Officiel Ukraine underwent significant changes in content policy and editorial strategy. She initiated new formats for presenting materials, focusing on blending fashion trends with cultural and social issues.

=== Kyiv Smart City ===
Yaroslava Boiko is an expert and coordinator in the field of digital technology and urban innovation who played a key role in the development of Kyiv Smart City projects from 2015 to 2020. She significantly contributed to the promotion and implementation of the smart city concept in Ukraine's capital.

=== Kyiv Smart City Forum ===
Under her leadership, the Kyiv Smart City Forum was successfully organized and held in 2018, 2019, and 2020, becoming one of the most important events in the field of urban technology and innovation. The forum gathered leading specialists, entrepreneurs, and government representatives who discussed the opportunities and prospects for integrating modern technologies into the urban environment. One of the key topics of the forum was the digitalization of Kyiv and Ukrainian cities, viewed as an effective tool for transforming urban spaces to enhance the comfort and safety of citizens. In the "Smart City. Country in a Smartphone" section, global urban development trends were discussed, including the unification of payment systems and the active use of Big Data. City authorities presented the results of Kyiv's smart digital infrastructure development and shared plans for the coming year.

=== Smart Kyiv Resident Guide ===
In 2018, under the initiative of Yaroslava Boiko, the "Smart Kyiv Resident Guide" was developed and launched — a practical manual designed to help Kyiv residents navigate the city's modern digital services. This guide became a valuable resource for citizens, aiding them in the comfortable and efficient use of urban infrastructure. The "Smart Kyiv Resident Guide" is part of the modular course "Kyiv Smart City," which educates young Kyiv residents on how to effectively utilize financial tools in a smart city environment. Given Kyiv's gradual transition to cashless payments — including payment terminals, self-service kiosks, mobile parking apps, and contactless metro fare payment — such knowledge is essential for the new smart generation.

=== FIRST Tech Challenge ===
One of the most significant achievements of Yaroslava Boiko and the NGO "SMART CITY HUB" was the successful implementation of the FIRST Tech Challenge movement in Ukraine. In today's world, where digitalization and smart technologies have become an integral part of daily life, it is crucial to prepare students for future challenges by fostering their interest in science, technology, and invention. The FIRST Tech Challenge project, implemented in many countries worldwide, aimed to increase young people's interest in exact sciences and modern technologies. As part of the competition program, students in grades 7–11 had the opportunity to design, create, program, and operate robots of their own design. The competitions were held on a specially prepared arena, where teams competed in solving tasks that required hard work, innovative approaches, and teamwork. The first FIRST Tech Challenge in Ukraine took place in April 2020 and became a significant event for Ukrainian youth. Participation in such projects helped students learn how to set goals, find solutions, model situations, and present themselves and their work results, which was extremely important for their future professional development.

=== Kyiv Smart City School ===
Since 2018, thanks to the efforts of the team and the active participation of school administrators and computer science teachers, educational branches of Kyiv Smart City School have been established in 20 public schools in Kyiv. This project aims to introduce innovations in education and motivate students to engage more deeply in technical disciplines. In December 2019, as part of the communication and educational platform Kyiv Smart City School, a series of events for children and adults were held, focusing on the study of technology and innovation. With the support of Kyiv residents who voted for the development of Kyiv Smart City School within the framework of the "Public Budget-2019," three free specialized courses in programming languages Scratch and Java were organized. Children and adults gained practical programming and web resource development skills, contributing to their professional growth. Yaroslava Boyko also actively worked on integrating the "Smart City" concept into the educational process. Since 2019, she has initiated the teaching of the "Smart City" subject in Kyiv schools, which became an important step in preparing the younger generation for life in the modern digital world. This innovation gave students the opportunity to familiarize themselves with the principles and technologies used to enhance city management efficiency, particularly through the use of digital tools and solutions.

The rapid digitalization of the modern world and the emergence of new professions and teaching methods present serious challenges to the traditional education system, which often struggles to keep pace with the rapid changes in the global innovation environment. The projects of Kyiv Smart City School have become an important addition to the school curriculum, offering valuable skills that are in high demand today.

=== Subject: "Smart City" ===
One of the key initiatives is the introduction of the "Smart City" subject into Kyiv schools, which includes the study of basic digital technologies, programming, and smart city concepts. As part of this program, a "Smart City" course was developed for children aged 9–12, aimed at teaching programming and developing digital skills, including basics in Python, Scratch, and HTML. The program also includes lessons on cybersecurity, internet marketing, and skills development with digital tools. The goal of these courses is not only to teach children programming fundamentals but also to foster critical thinking, problem-solving skills, and teamwork. The "Smart City School" program is publicly available, allowing computer science teachers to use it to enhance their lessons and integrate modern digital technologies into the educational process.

=== Smart City School Hackathon ===
Another initiative by Yaroslava Boiko was the organization of the Smart City School Hackathon, held at the SMART CITY HUB. This event was part of the project No. 1808 of Kyiv's Public Budget 2020. During the hackathon, participants fully immersed themselves in programming, showcasing their IT knowledge and skills with technology. Teams programmed robotics in real time under the guidance of mentors, using Makeblock kits and laptops.

=== Tel Aviv – Kyiv Smart City Accelerator ===
Another significant initiative by Yaroslava Boiko was the "Tel Aviv – Kyiv Smart City Accelerator" program — the largest accelerator for Smart City projects in Ukraine. The primary goal of the program is to assist urban startups in creating and developing promising solutions that could become part of the innovative infrastructure of the capital. The accelerator provides urban startups with technical resources and expert support, which helps expedite the finalization of solutions and prepare them for the global market. The program focuses on smart city technologies such as the Internet of Things (IoT), machine learning, Big Data, and the development of artificial intelligence within urban infrastructure. The "Tel Aviv – Kyiv Smart City Accelerator" aims to help participants acquire the necessary knowledge to build a successful business and understand the nuances of launching technological products, which will contribute to the development of smart cities in the future. Yaroslava Boiko's work with Kyiv Smart City has significantly impacted infrastructure development and improved the quality of life for Kyiv's residents, establishing the Ukrainian capital as a leading innovator in implementing cutting-edge urban solutions.
