= Milan Vukmirovic =

French editor and businessperson (born 1970)

Milan Vukmirovic (born 1970) is currently Editor-in-Chief and founder of FASHION FOR MEN bookmazine and Menswear Creative Director of Ports 1961, since 2015.

== Early life and education ==
Born in Chantilly, France in 1970 to a Serbian family, Vukmirovic studied at ESMOD in Paris. However, he left school in favor of an internship at the Le Jardin des Modes.

== Career ==
In 1996, Milan co-founded Colette, the concept store in Paris.

In 2000, Milan was appointed Design Director for the Gucci Group, and subsequently, the Creative Director of Jil Sander.

In 2005, menswear magazine, L'Officiel Hommes, enlisted him as their Editor-in-Chief. Milan joined Trussardi as Creative Director in 2007.

== Milestones ==
1996-1999 - Colette Creative Director and Buyer - Co-founder of the Parisian concept store, which opened in March 1997, Milan was in charge of the overall image of the store (window displays, inside visual merchandising) and all the buying (furniture, interior design objects, cosmetics, men's and women's ready-to-wear, accessories and leather goods, sportswear)

1997-2004 - Freelance Fashion Stylist - During this period, Milan collaborated with magazines – such as i-D, Numéro and Dutch – as a freelance fashion stylist.

2000 - Gucci Design Director Gucci Group - Milan worked alongside Tom Ford on all design aspects from Gucci to the development of brands such as Sergio Rossi and YSL.

2001 to 2003 - Jil Sander Creative Director - Milan was in charge of the brand's image (advertising campaigns, store image) and collections (men's and women's ready-to-wear, accessories and leather goods). He also worked closely with Richard Avedon on the advertising campaigns for three seasons.

2005 to 2011 - L'OFFICIEL HOMMES PARIS Editor-in-Chief/Creative Director - In 2005, Milan was asked to re-launch the magazine L’Officiel Hommes Paris, where he took on the role of Editor-in-Chief and Creative Director. After seven years, the magazine developed substantially, counting more than 12 international versions under its title.

2004 - DINH VAN - Milan designed a capsule collection, called “Black and White”, for Parisian jewellers Dinh Van.

2007 to 2011 - Trussardi 1911 Creative Director - As Creative Director, Milan was in charge of all the image of the brand (advertising as creative director and photographer for Trussardi 1911, Trussardi Jeans, Tru Trussardi, Trussardi Parfums) and was also in charge of all new branding (logos and packaging for Trussardi). Milan created all of the new interior design for the Trussardi 1911 stores worldwide, including the flagship store and restaurant Trussardi Piazza Della Scala. He was also in charge of all of the men's and women's Trussardi 1911 collection (ready-to-wear, accessories, leather goods).

2011 to Present - FASHION FOR MEN Publisher, Creative Director and Editor-in-chief - In 2011, Milan launched Fashion For Men, a new men's international luxury magazine in a book format.

2007 to Present - Fashion Photographer - Over this period, Milan has worked as a fashion photographer for editorials in Fashion For Men, L’Officiel Hommes, DETAILS, V Man, i-D and for advertising campaigns for clients such as Armani, Hugo Boss, Neil Barrett, Trussardi and Chevignon.

2011-2013 SHINSEGAE INTERNATIONAL Consultant, Creative Director, Buyer Milan regularly consults for Shinsegae International in South Korea, for whom he opened the new concept store, My Boon, in July 2012, where he worked as a creative director and works as a buyer today. Milan also worked on different concepts for their department store, particularly focusing on the BOON THE SHOP brand.

2007-2013 - THE WEBSTER MIAMI Creative Director, Corporate Officer and Co-Founder - In 2007, Milan founded this multi-brand fashion and concept store in Miami with Laure Heriard Dubreuil and Frederic Dechnik. He was in charge of all creative aspects including interior design, visual display, packaging and advertising.

2012/13 - CHEVIGNON Creative Director and Photographer - Capsule collection of two seasons (Autumn/Winter 2012/2013 and Spring/Summer 2013) for line called Chevignon Heritage, for men and women.

2015 to Present - Ports 1961 - Menswear Creative Director
