= Bal Harbour Shops =

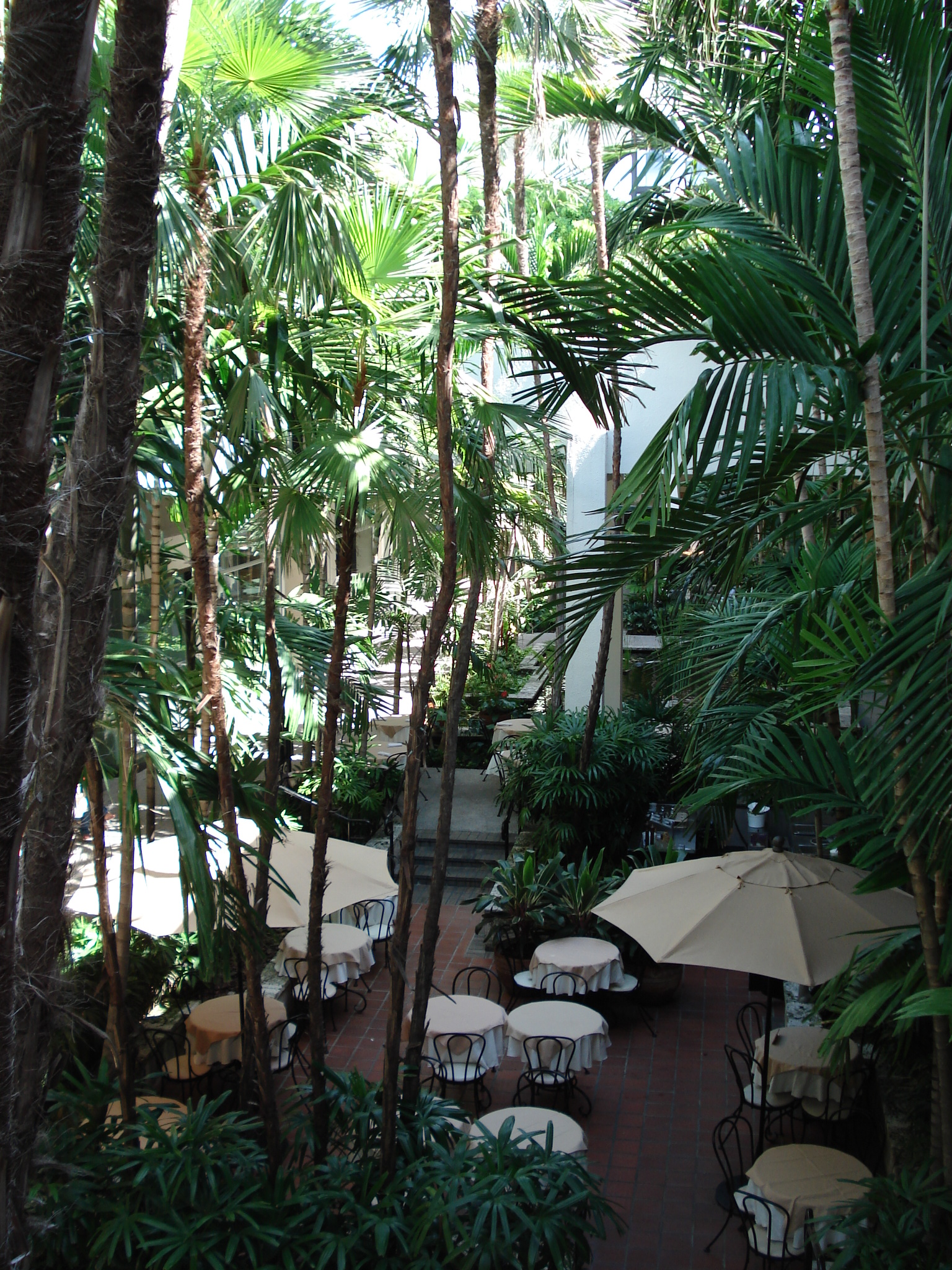
- Location: Bal Harbour, Florida, US
- Coordinates: 25.88825°N 80.12519°W
- Address: 9700 Collins Avenue
- Opened: 1965; 61 years ago
- Developer: Whitman Family
- Manager: Whitman Family Properties
- Owner: Whitman Family Properties
- Architect: Herbert H. Johnson & Associates
- Num. of stores: Approximately 100
- Num. of anchor tenants: 2
- Floor area: 450,000 sq ft (42,000 m^{2})
- Floors: 3
- Website: www.balharbourshops.com

Bal Harbour Shops is an open-air shopping mall in Bal Harbour, Florida, an affluent suburb of Miami Beach. With Neiman Marcus and Saks Fifth Avenue as anchors, the mall had sales of $3,000 per square foot in 2015, ranked among the highest-grossing retail centers in the world.

== History ==
From 1954 to 1962, Stanley Whitman travelled around the United States, studying shopping centers.

In 1957, Whitman acquired the site for $2 per square foot, then a record price for retail property. It was the site of a former United States Army barracks and World War II prisoner-of-war camp. He built a non-traditional open-air shopping mall due to the tropical climate and seaside location across the street from the Atlantic Ocean. At first, Whitman hired architect Victor Gruen, but then fired him and hired Herb Johnson, based in Miami.

The shopping center opened in 1965, with the inaugural collection of stores including FAO Schwarz, Abercrombie & Fitch and Martha's, considered one of the most influential international women’s salons hosting fashion shows with designers Valentino and Oscar de la Renta (both of whom would later open boutiques at Bal Harbour Shops). Early European Designer store openings included Yves Saint Laurent and Gucci. A few years later Cartier, Versace and Chanel opened.

In 1971, Neiman Marcus opened a department store at the center. In 1976, Saks Fifth Avenue opened a department store at the center. In 1977, Gucci opened a store at the center. By 1987, it realized sales of $1,000 per square foot.

In 1982, Bal Harbour Shops was the first shopping center planned for vertical expansion to add 100,000 square feet (9,300 m^{2}) of retail space on Level 2. In 1983, a second level was added.

Overall sales at the shopping center rose from $1,000 per square foot in 1997, five times the national average, to $1,350 per square foot in 2002, $2,000 per square foot in 2008, $2,730 per square foot in 2012, and $3,000 per square foot in 2015. In 2022, shopping mall had sales of $3,400 per square foot.

In 2012, the Whitman family struck a land swap deal with Church by the Sea. Bal Harbour Shops agreed to build a 60,000-square-foot (5,600 m^{2}) church on a site on Kane Concourse in Bay Harbor Islands that had been a car dealership.

In January 2013, Bal Harbour Shops announced an equity partnership with Swire Properties to jointly develop the 500,000-square-foot (46,000 m^{2}) retail component of Brickell CityCentre in downtown Miami.

In 2017, a $550 million enhancement plan was approved to add 241,600 square feet (22,450 m^{2}) of new retail space and restaurants to Bal Harbour Shops with a completion date of 2024.

== See also ==
- Stanley Whitman
