= Nude photography =

Photography of the naked human body

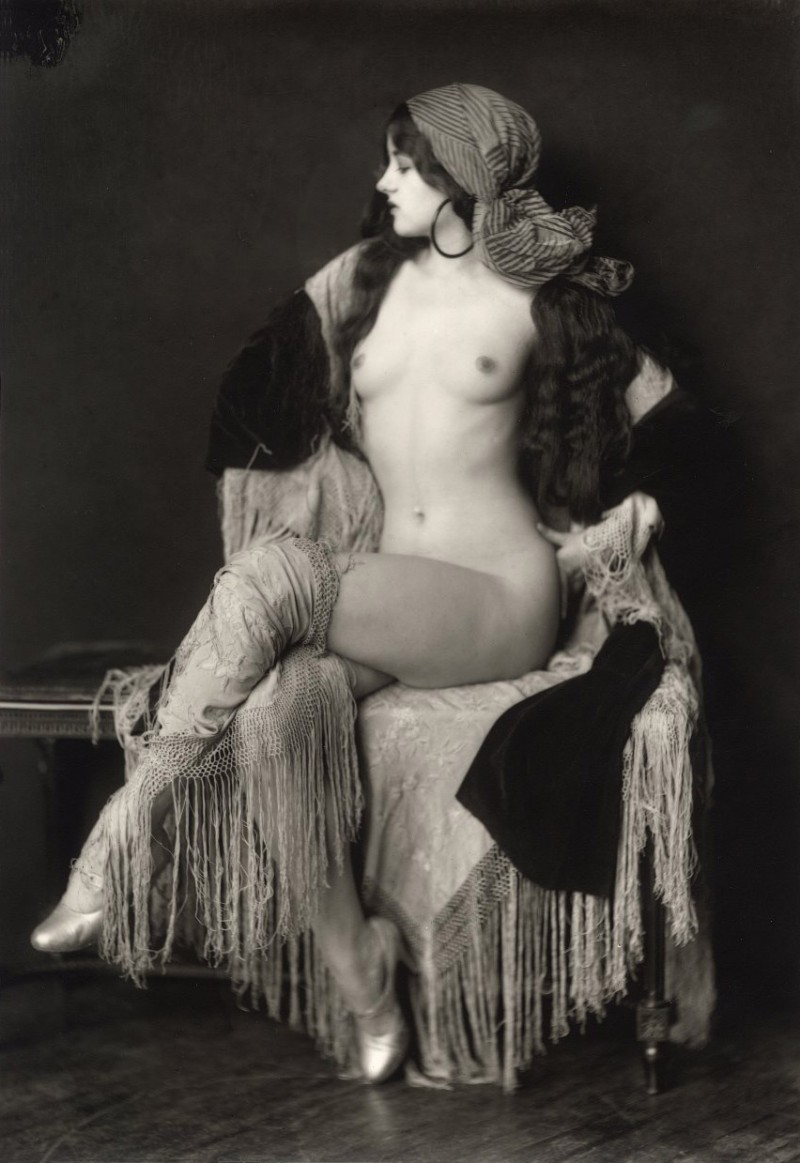
Virginia Biddle, by Alfred Cheney Johnston

Nude photography is the creation of any photograph which contains an image of a nude or semi-nude person, or an image suggestive of nudity. Nude photography is undertaken for a variety of purposes, including educational uses, commercial applications (including erotic or pornographic materials) and artistic creations.

The exhibition or publication of nude photographs may be controversial, more so in some cultures and countries than in others, and especially if the subject or viewer is a minor.

== Educational ==
Nude photographs may be used for scientific and educational purpose, such as ethnographic studies, human physiology or sex education. In this context, the emphasis of the photograph is not on the subject, or the beauty or eroticism of the image, but on the educational or demonstrative purpose for which the image was produced.

The nude image may be used for analysis or to accompany medical or other text books, scientific reports, articles or research papers. They are essentially of an illustrative nature, and so nude photographs of this type are often labeled to show key features in a supporting context.

== Commercial ==
=== Erotic ===
Since the first days of photography, the nude was a source of inspiration for those that adopted the new medium. Most of the early images were closely guarded or surreptitiously circulated as violations of the social norms of the time, since the photograph captures real nudity. Many cultures, while accepting nudity in art, shun actual nudity. For example, even an art gallery which exhibits nude paintings will typically not accept nudity in a visitor. Alfred Cheney Johnston (1885–1971) was a professional American photographer who often photographed Ziegfeld Follies. He also maintained his own highly successful commercial photo studio, producing magazine ads for a wide range of upscale retail commercial products—mostly men's and women's fashions—and also photographed several hundred artists and showgirls, including nude photographs of some. Most of his nude images (some named, mostly anonymous) were, in fact, showgirls from the Ziegfeld Follies, but such daring, unretouched full-frontal images would certainly not have been openly publishable in the 1920s–1930s, so it is speculated that these were either simply his own personal artistic work, and/or done at the behest of Flo Ziegfeld for the showman's personal enjoyment.

Showgirls (c. 1920)
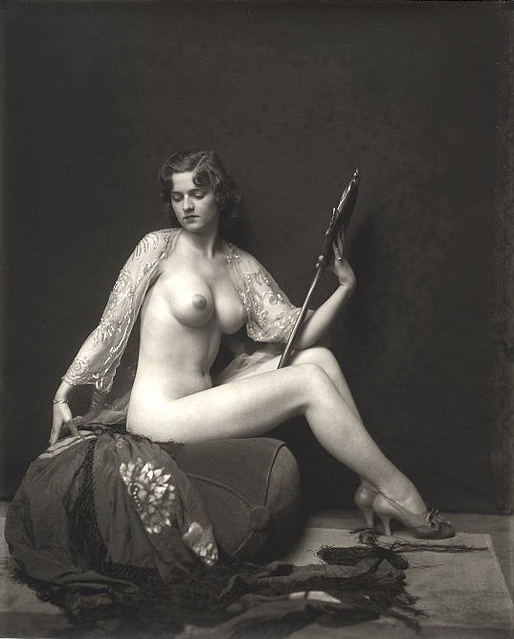
Ziegfeld Follies showgirl Dorothy Flood by Johnston

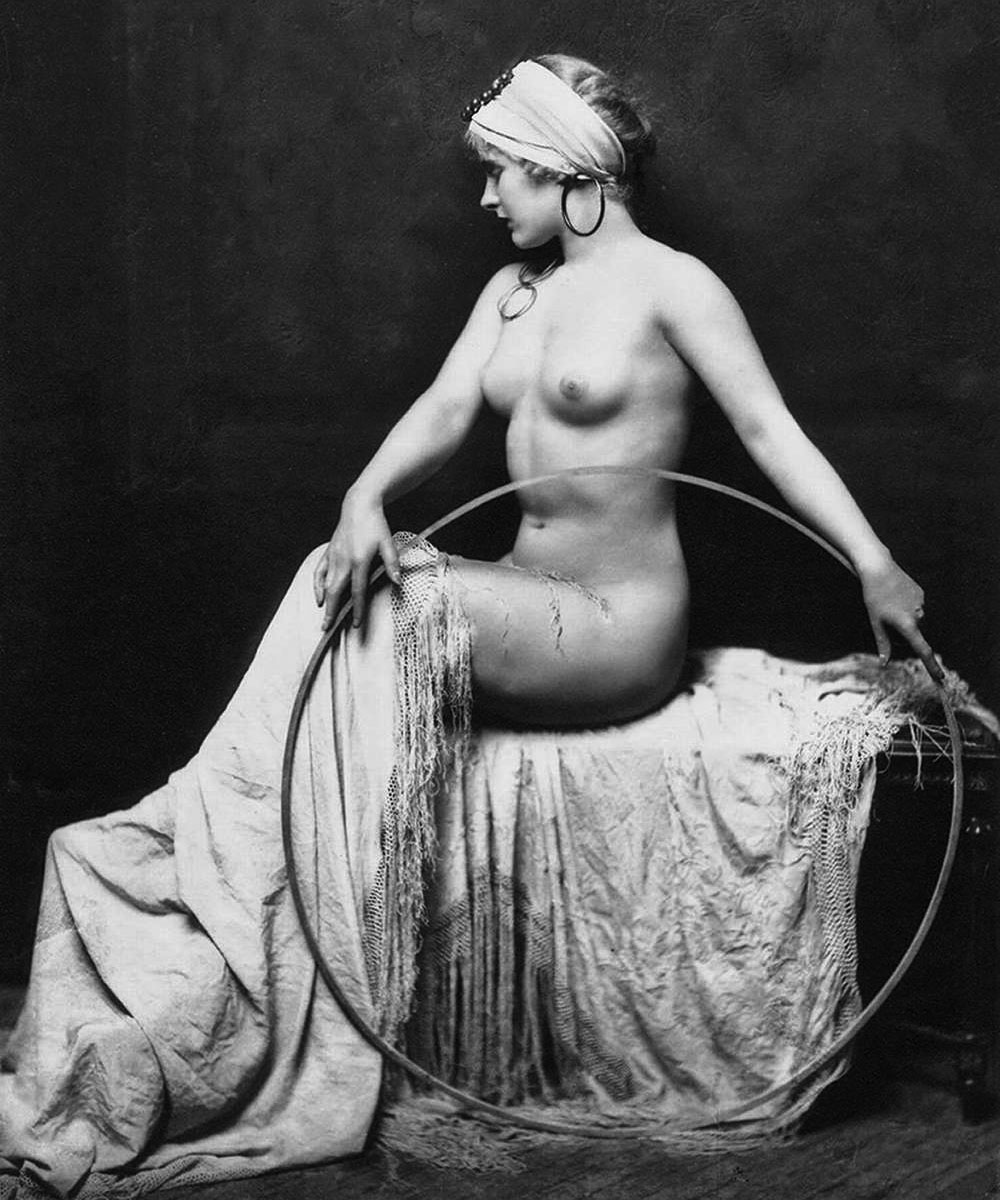
Unidentified model by Johnston

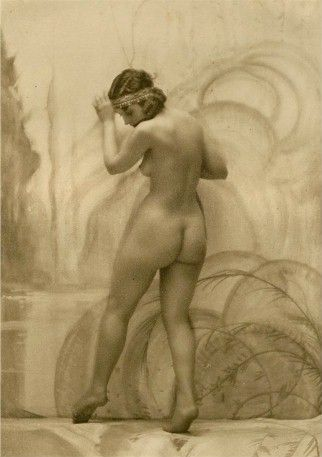
Folies Bergère showgirl by Stanisław Julian Ignacy Ostroróg

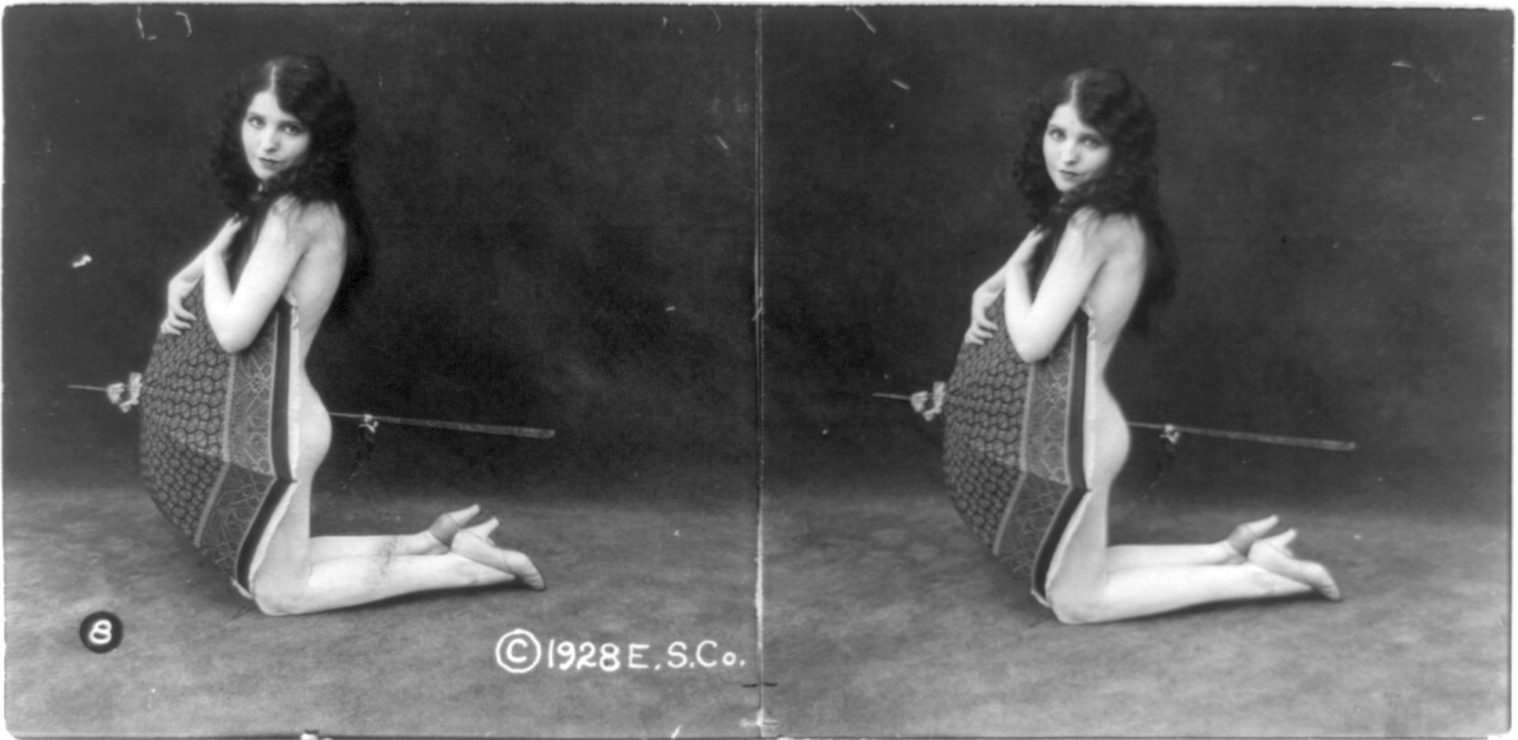
stereoscopic pair of an unidentified nude model kneeling with an open umbrella obscuring her torso

=== Glamour ===
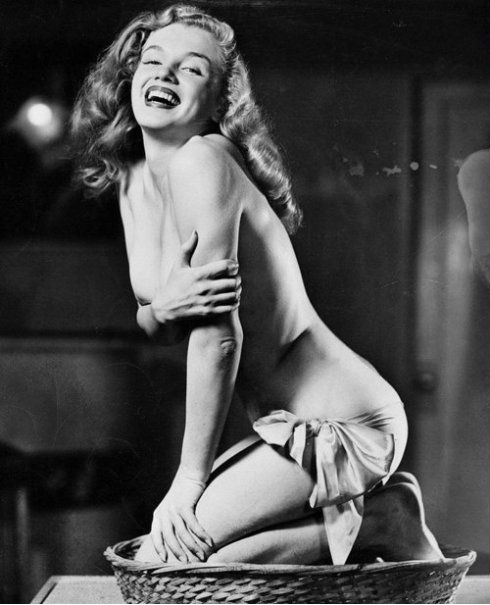
Marilyn Monroe posing topless for Earl Moran around 1950

Glamour photographs emphasize the subject, usually female, in a romantic and most attractive, sexually alluring manner. The subject may be fully clothed or semi-nude, but glamour photography stops short of intentionally sexually arousing the viewer and being pornographic. Before about the 1960s, glamour photography was commonly referred to as erotic photography.

=== Advertising ===
Nudity and sexually suggestive imagery is common in modern-day culture and widely used in advertising to help sell products. A feature of this form of advertising is that the imagery used typically has no connection to the product being advertised. The purpose of such imagery is to attract the attention of a potential customer or user. The imagery used may include nudity, actual or suggestive, and glamour photography.

=== Entertainment ===
Nude or semi-nude imagery is also widely used in entertainment, sometimes referred to as adult entertainment. This may be in the form of postcards, pin ups, and other formats.

Covers of mainstream magazines sometimes include images of nude or semi-nude subjects. In the early 1990s, Demi Moore posed for two covers of Vanity Fair: Demi's Birthday Suit and More Demi Moore. Some magazines, such as men's magazines, commonly feature nude or semi-nude images, and some magazines have created a reputation for their nude centerfolds.

=== Music album covers ===
Music album covers often incorporate photography, at times including nude or semi-nude images. Album covers that have incorporated nudity have included those of performers such as Jimi Hendrix (Electric Ladyland, 1968), John Lennon and Yoko Ono (Unfinished Music No. 1: Two Virgins, 1968), Nirvana (Nevermind, 1991), Blind Faith (Blind Faith, 1969), Scorpions (Virgin Killer, 1976) and Jane's Addiction (Nothing's Shocking, 1988). The covers for Blind Faith and Virgin Killer were especially controversial because the nude images were of prepubescent girls, and were re-issued with alternative covers in some countries.

== Fine art ==
The emphasis of fine arts is aesthetics and creativity; and any erotic interest, although often present, is secondary. This distinguishes nude photography from both glamour photography and pornographic photography. The distinction between these is not always clear, and photographers tends to use their own judgment in characterizing their own work, though viewers also have their judgement. The nude remains a controversial subject in all media, but more so with photography due to its inherent realism. The male nude has been less common than the female, and more rarely exhibited.

=== History ===
Durieu/Delacroix

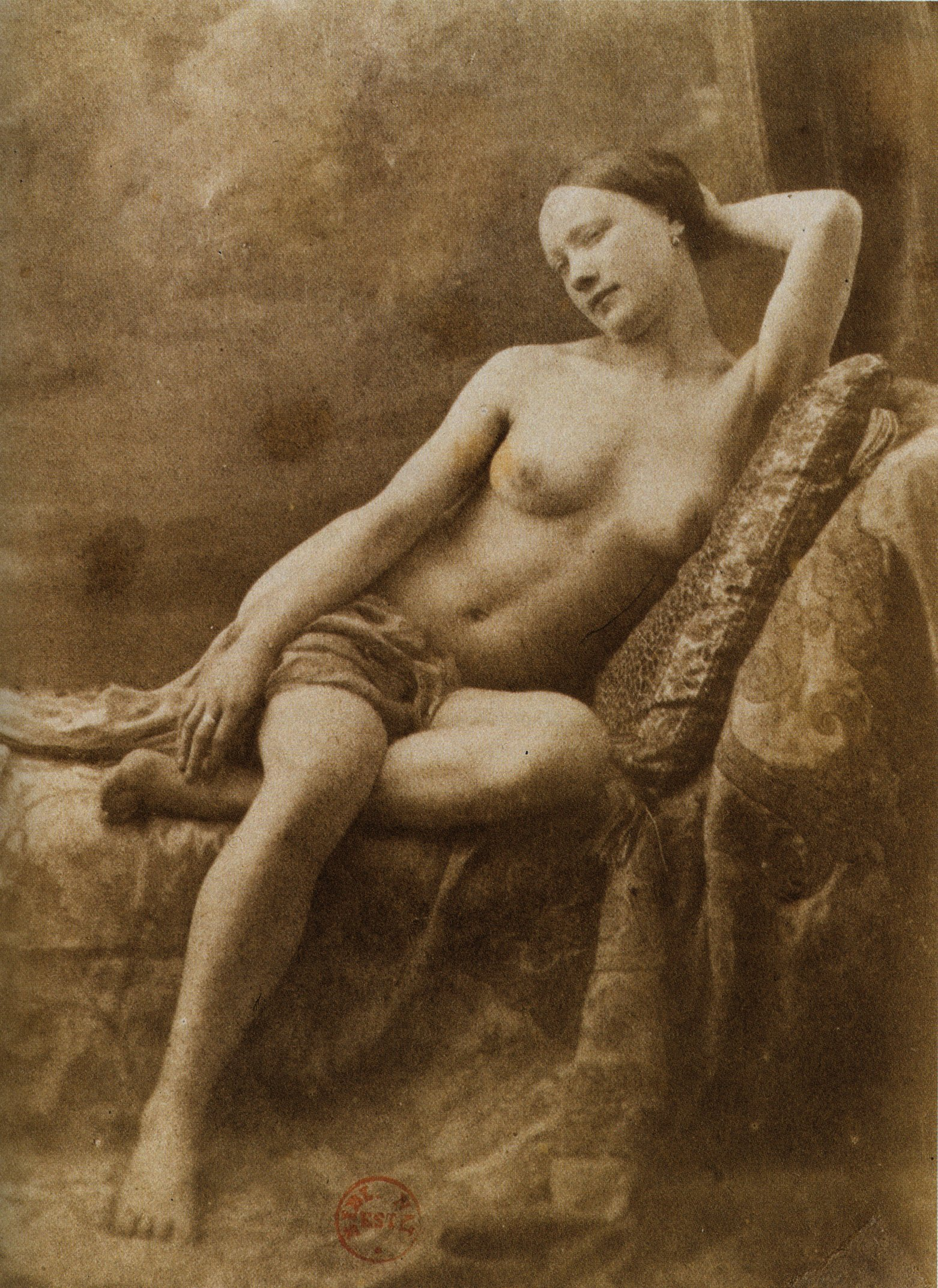
Photograph by Jean Louis Marie Eugène Durieu, part of a series made with Eugène Delacroix

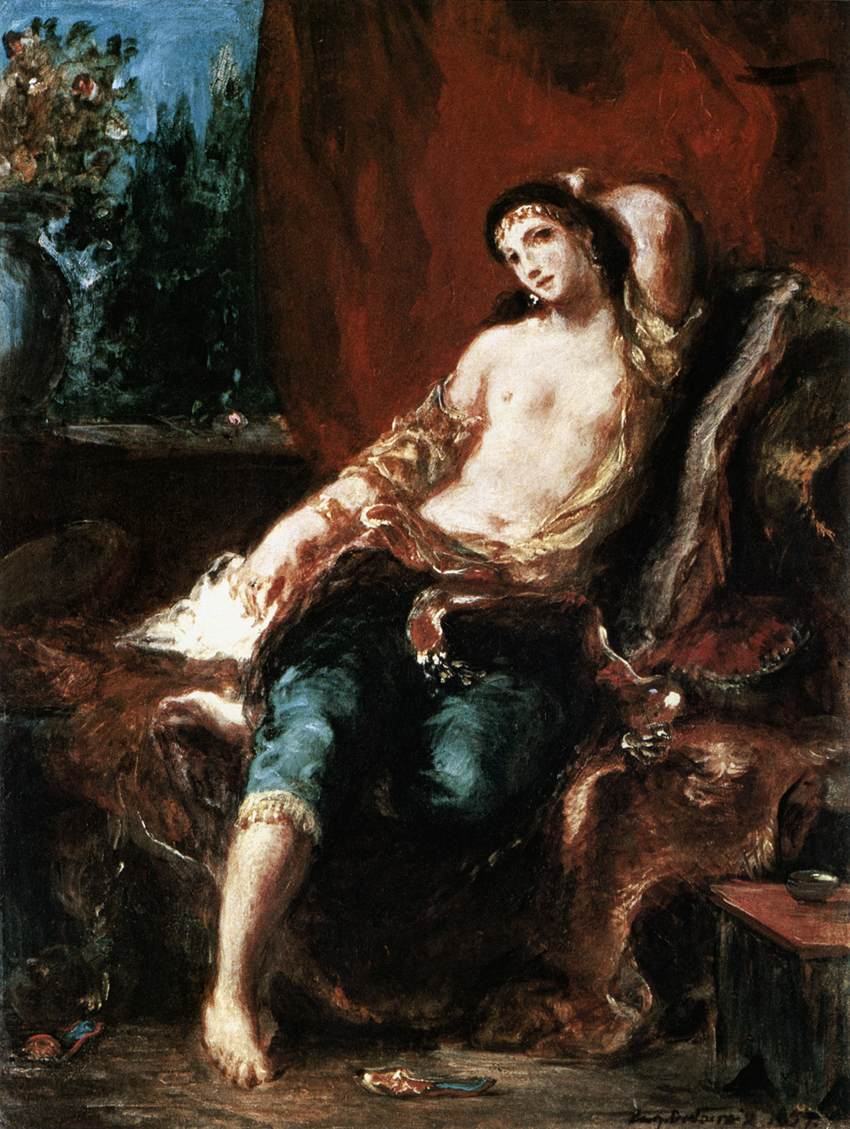
Odalisque (1857) by Eugène Delacroix, a painting with similar pose

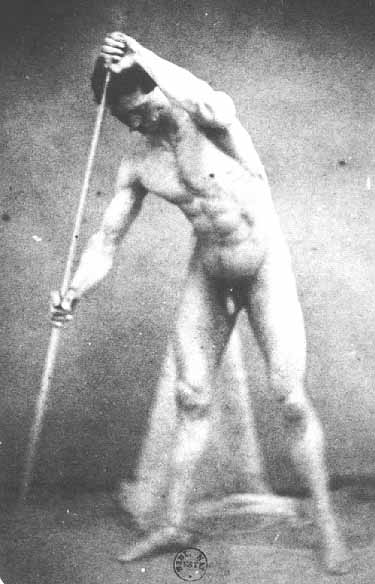
Photograph by Jean Louis Marie Eugène Durieu, c. 1855

==== 19th century ====
Early fine-art photographers in Western cultures, seeking to establish photography as a fine-art medium, frequently chose women as the subjects for their nudes, in poses that accorded with traditional practice in other media. Before nude photography, art nudes usually used allusions to classical antiquity; gods and warriors, goddesses and nymphs. Poses, lighting, soft focus, vignetting and hand retouching were employed to create photographic images that were comparable to the other arts at that time. Although 19th-century artists in other media often used photographs as substitutes for live models, the best of these photographs were also intended as works of art in their own right.

Historical images

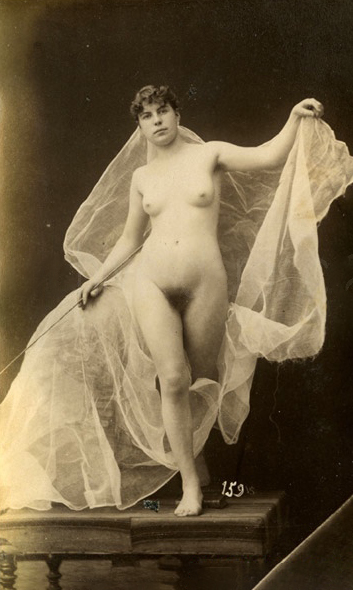
Nude by Gaudenzio Marconi, 19th century

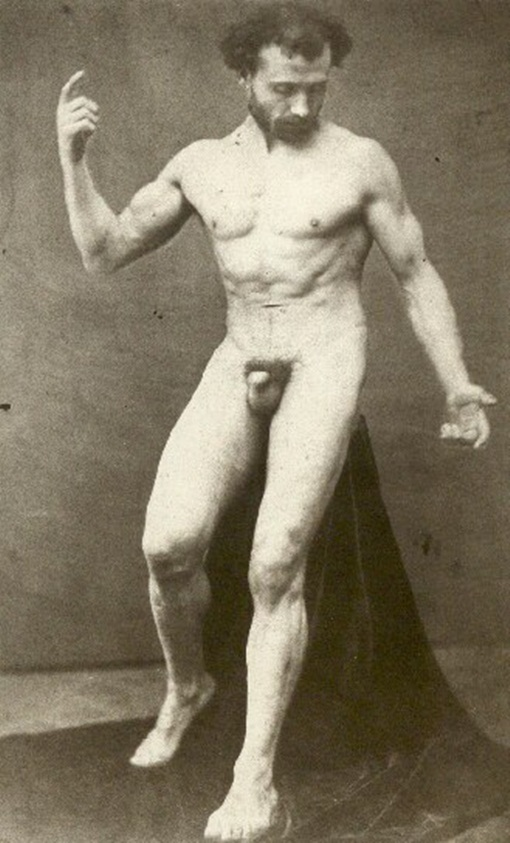
Nude by Gaudenzio Marconi, 1841–1885

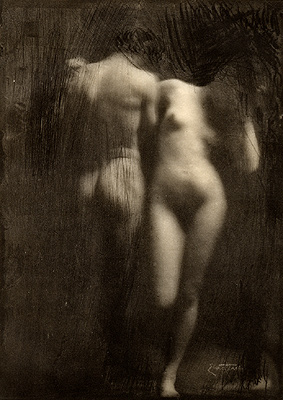
Adam and Eve by Frank Eugene, taken 1898, published in Camera Work no. 30, 1910

==== Modern ====
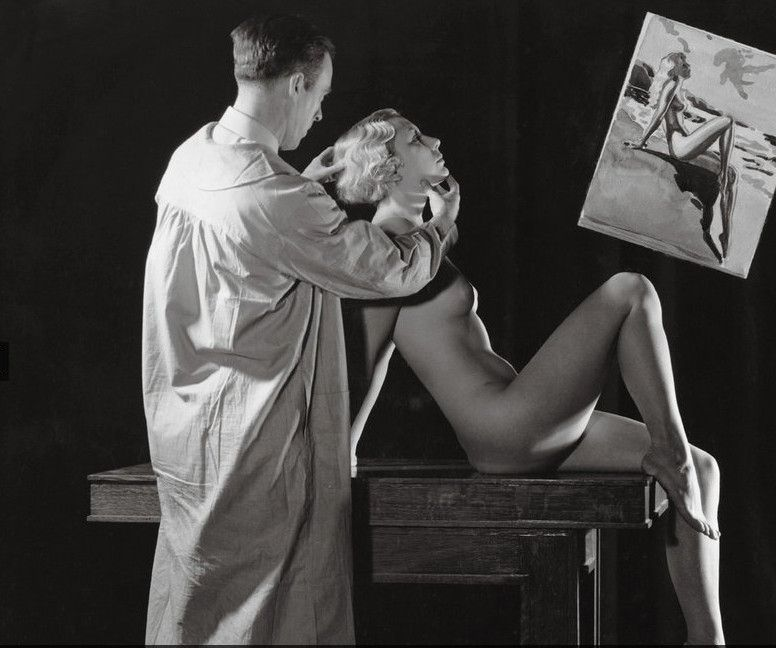
Zoë Mozert was one of Earl Moran's first nude models in the 1930s.

After World War I, avant-garde photographers such as Brassaï, Man Ray, Hans Bellmer, André Kertész and Bill Brandt became more experimental in their portrayal of nudity, using reflective distortions and printing techniques to create abstractions or depicting real life rather than classical allusions. Alfred Stieglitz's photos of Georgia O'Keeffe are examples of some of the earliest nudes presented in an intimate and personal style rather than with dispassionate idealization. Edward Weston, Imogen Cunningham, Ruth Bernhard, Harry Callahan, Emmet Gowin and Edward Steichen continued this trend. Weston evolved a particularly American aesthetic, using a large format camera to capture images of nature and landscapes as well as nudes, establishing photography as a fine-arts medium. In 1937 Weston became the first photographer to be awarded a John Simon Guggenheim Memorial Fellowship. For a famous example of Weston's work see: Charis Wilson. Many fine-art photographers have a variety of subjects in their work, the nude being one. Diane Arbus was attracted to unusual people in unusual settings, including a nudist camp. Lee Friedlander had more conventional subjects, one being Madonna as a young model.

==== Contemporary ====
The distinction between fine art and glamour is often one of marketing, with fine art being sold through galleries or dealers in limited editions signed by the artist, and glamour photos being distributed through mass media. For some, the difference is in the gaze of the model; glamour models look into the camera, while art models do not. Glamour and fashion photographers have aspired to fine-art status in some of their work. One such photographer was Irving Penn, who progressed from Vogue magazine to photographing fashion models such as Kate Moss nude. Richard Avedon, Helmut Newton and Annie Leibovitz have followed a similar path with portraits of the famous, many of them nude or partially clothed. In the post-modern era, where fame is often the subject of fine art, Avedon's photo of Nastassja Kinski with a python, and Leibovitz's magazine covers of Demi Moore pregnant and in body paint have become iconic. The work of Joyce Tenneson has gone the other way, from fine art with a unique, soft-focus style showing women at all stages of life to portraiture of famous people and fashion photography.

Although nude photographers have largely worked within established forms that show bodies as sculptural abstractions, some, such as Robert Mapplethorpe, have created works that deliberately blur the boundaries between erotica and art.

Several photographers have become controversial because of their nude photographs of underage subjects. David Hamilton often used erotic themes. Sally Mann was raised in rural Virginia, in a locale where skinny-dipping in a river was common, so many of her most famous photographs are of her own children swimming in the nude. Less well-known photographers have been charged as criminals for photos of their own children.

Body image has become a topic explored by many photographers working with models whose bodies do not conform to the largely universal perceptions of beauty.

Contemporary
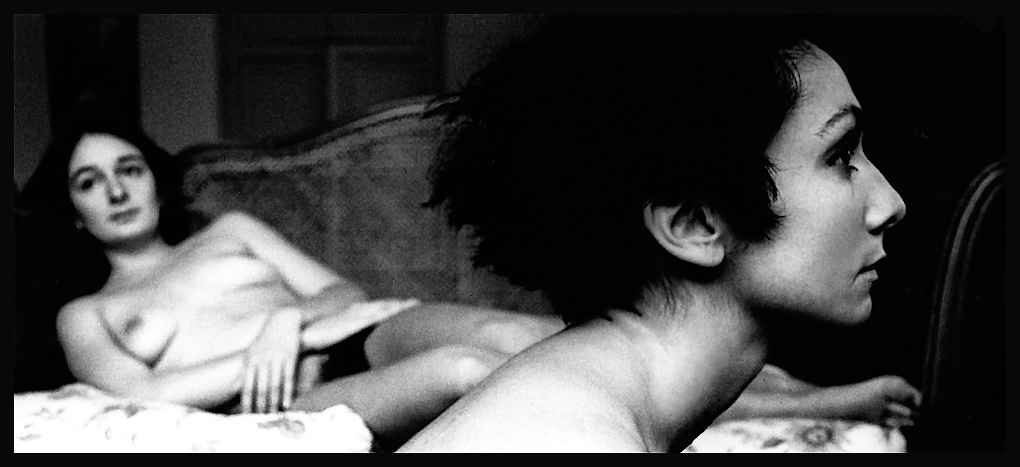
Nudes (1980) by Augusto De Luca

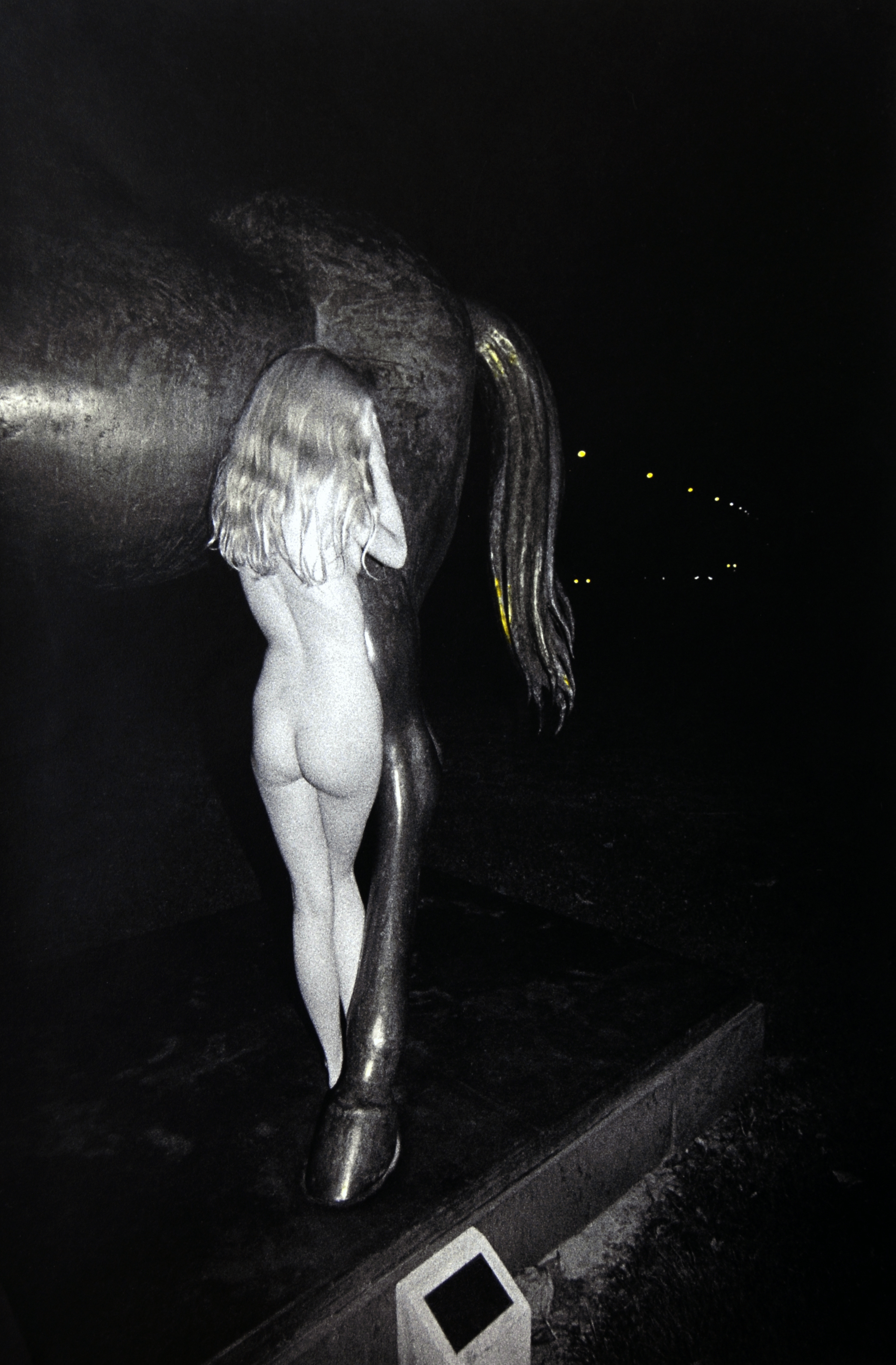
Equus (1989) by Sergio Valle Duarte

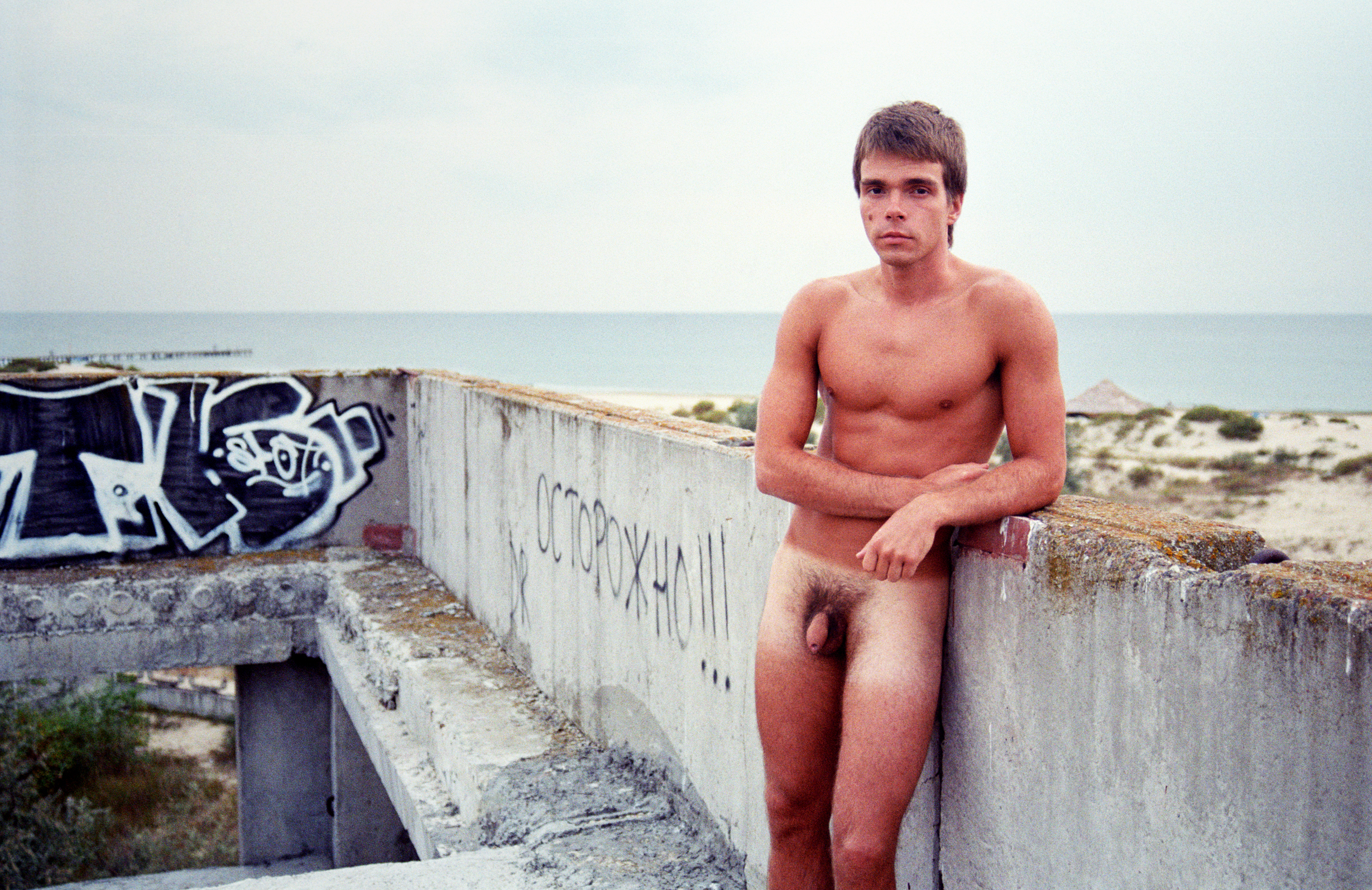
Nude male (2009) by Sasha Kargaltsev

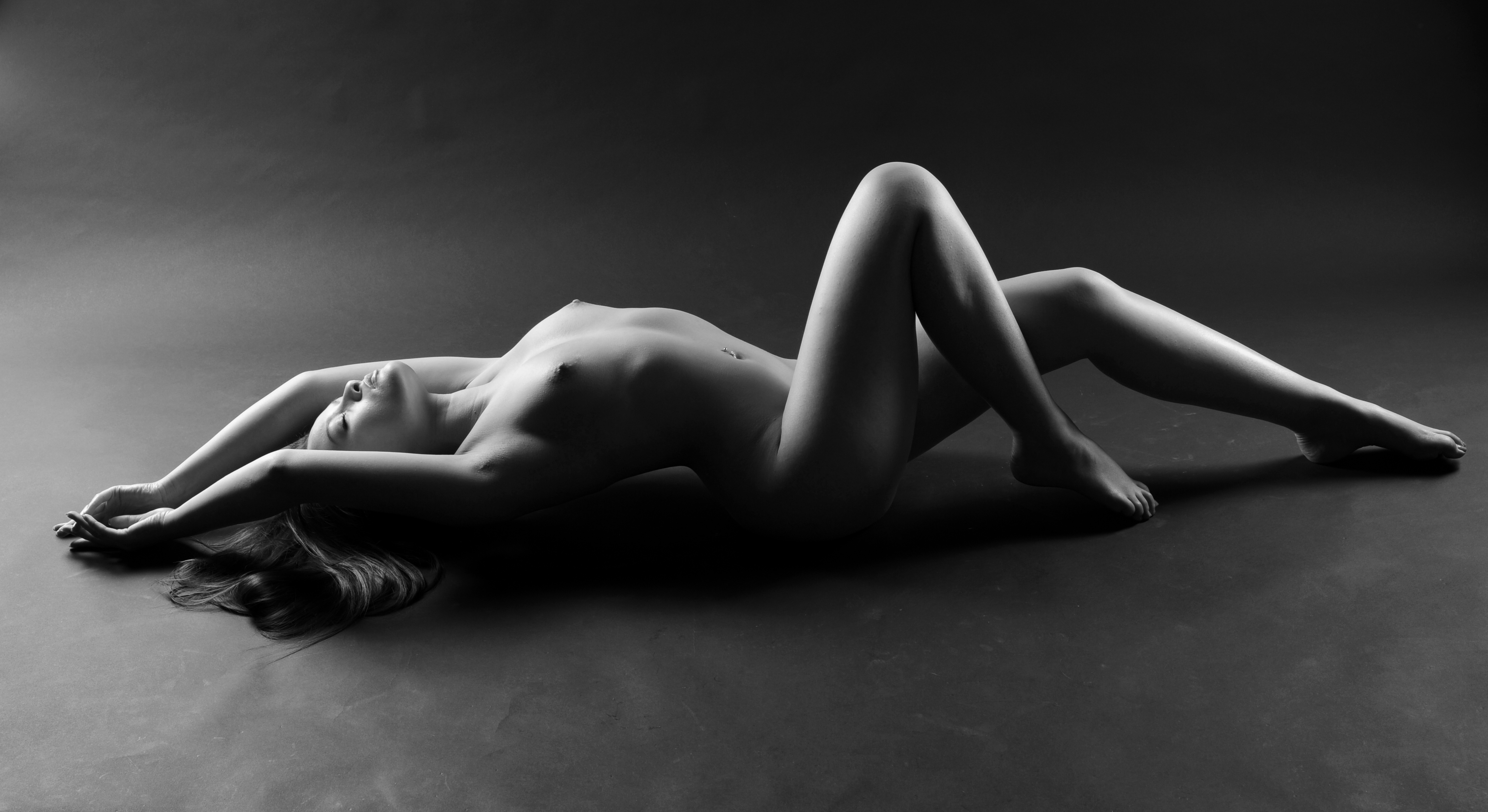
Nu artistique féminin (2011) by Jean-Christophe Destailleur

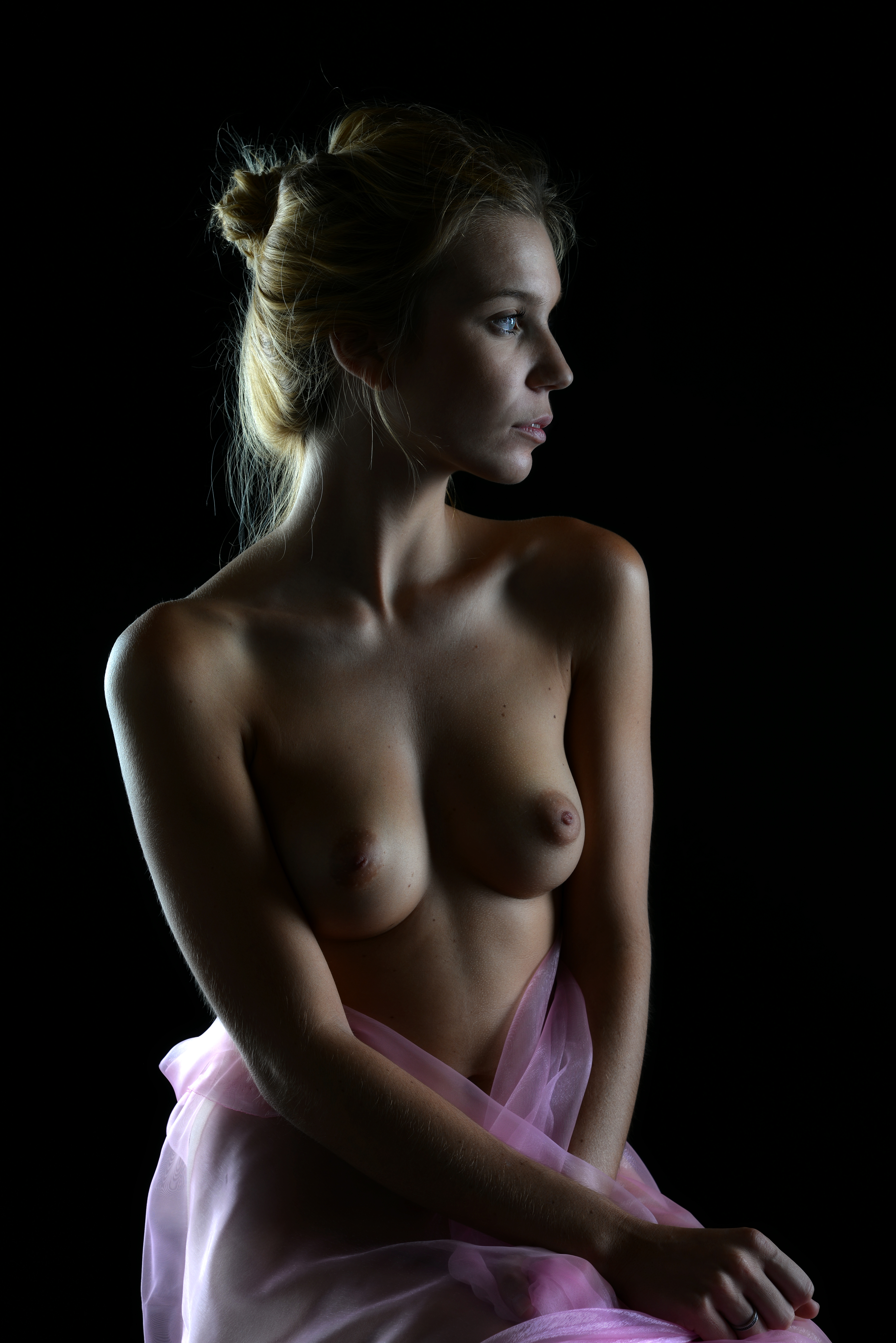
Topless sitting woman (2014) by Patrick Subotkiewiez

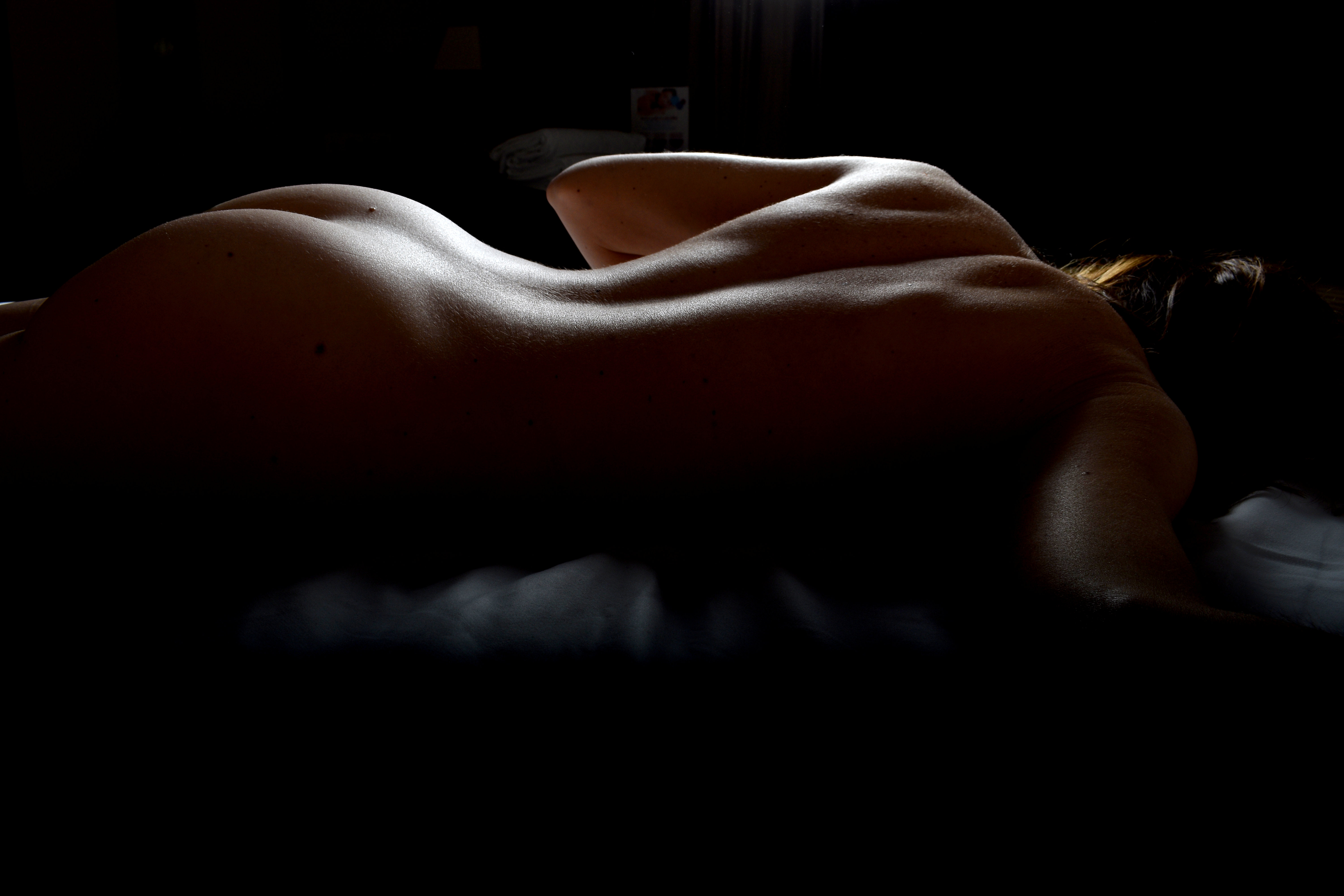
Female Body Landscape (2017) by Cosme Madini

== See also ==
- Nude (art)
- Depictions of nudity
- Deepfake pornography
- Fine-art photography
- Fine-art nude photography
- Glamour photography
- Erotic photography model
