= Danny Fuller =

Danny Fuller is the name of:

- Danny Fuller (EastEnders), a character in UK TV series EastEnders
- Danny Fuller (surfer) (born 1982), American surfer
- The second Kid Supreme, character in comic book Supreme
