= Disappearing Model =

Body painting by Joanne Gair

Disappearing Model, 2000

Disappearing Model is a trompe-l'œil body painting by Joanne Gair that was part of episode 1.19 or 119 of Ripley's Believe It or Not!, which was the highest-rated episode. The number 119 represents the nineteenth episode of the first season of the show, which aired exclusively on the TBS superstation.

== General episode details ==
The episode was hosted by Dean Cain, and it originally aired on either August 30 or September 6, 2000, depending upon the source. Both TV.com and IMDb.com claim the episode aired on the August date. TBS and Business Wire sources dated August 31, 2000, announce its premiere on the September date. Sony Pictures claims the episode aired on November 15, 2000, but does not clarify whether this was the premiere airing or a rerun. The episode had a total of six features.

== Gair's role on the episode ==
Descriptions of the episode describe Gair's notability for her ability to "make people disappear by painting them right into a background or paint clothing on a human body that is virtually undistinguishable from actual fabric!" More detailed descriptions of the episode describe the origin of Gair's notability as deriving from her production of the Vanity Fair magazine cover entitled Demi's Birthday Suit, also known as The Suit, in 1992.

During the episode, Gair exhibits body painting that appears to be no-fabric clothing and creates another work that causes the illusion that a model disappears into the background of a flower print. The 2000 body painting in which the model is indistinguishable from the red, blue and yellow flowers is known as Disappearing Model and is considered to be Gair's most famous work.

Gair's second book, Body Painting: Masterpieces by Joanne Gair, includes a photo of Disappearing Model. The section credits Tracy Bayne as the photographer of the Russian model Sasha. Gair notes that the show's producer, Gail Smerigan contacted her in 2000 about featuring her work in an episode. The intent was to capture a photo shoot specifically designed for the show with the intent of creating the illusion of causing the model to disappear.
