= Joanne Gair =

New Zealand artist, born 1958

- Born: c. 1958 (age 67–68); Auckland, New Zealand
- Known for: Body painting, Make-up artist
- Notable work: Demi's Birthday Suit (August 1992); Sports Illustrated Swimsuit Issues (1999–); Disappearing Model (2000)
- Movement: Trompe-l'œil
- Website: www.joannegair.com

Joanne Gair (born c. 1958), nicknamed Kiwi Jo (alternatively Kiwi Joe), is a New Zealand-born and -raised make-up artist and body painter whose body paintings have been featured in the Sports Illustrated Swimsuit Issue from 1999 to 2017. She is considered the world's leading trompe-l'œil body painter and make-up artist, and she became famous with a Vanity Fair Demi's Birthday Suit cover of Demi Moore in a body painting in 1992. Her Disappearing Model was featured on the highest-rated episode of Ripley's Believe It or Not. She is the daughter of George Gair.

In addition to achieving pop culture prominence and respect in the fashion and art worlds starting with her body painting of Demi Moore, she is a make-up artist in the rock and roll world who has helped several of her music clients win fashion and style awards. She is also considered a fashion and art trendsetter, and for a long time she was associated with Madonna. In 2001, she had her first retrospective and in 2005, she published her first book on body painting. At the peak of her pop culture fame after the Vanity Fair cover, she was seriously considered for an Absolut Vodka Absolute Gair ad campaign. She has done magazine editorial work, and in 2005, she became a photographer of her own body paintings in both books and magazines.

== Career ==
Gair, who is New Zealand-born and was raised in Auckland, lives in the United States and is based in Los Angeles. In 1977, she began teaching dance at a New Zealand primary school. She moved from New Zealand at the age of 21 and had a variety of stops on her way to Los Angeles. Most of the time was spent in Australia and Amsterdam, until she ventured to Los Angeles at the time of the 1984 Summer Olympics, after five years away from home. With the help of the Cloutier Agency she obtained a work permit. She then approached the Chanel and Gaultier beauty salons to offer her already well-respected make-up artist services. They both accepted her and she further solidified her reputation to the point where instead of being asked if she was George Gair's daughter it was more common for her father to be asked if he was Joanne Gair's father. Her early work in the music industry included album cover and music video work for David Lee Roth, Tina Turner, Grace Jones, Annie Lennox, and Mick Jagger. One of her early successes was being employed to do Roth's 1986 Eat 'Em and Smile album cover. These experiences led to work with Madonna, which started with music videos for "Express Yourself" and "Vogue". She has also done work on music videos for Aerosmith and Nine Inch Nails. Her work on the 1997 Nine Inch Nails video for "The Perfect Drug" won her the makeup portion of the best hair/makeup in a music video at the Music Video Production Awards. She had also won awards for Madonna's Frozen. Among the other notable musicians she has worked with is Gwen Stefani, who won Most Stylish Video at the 1999 VH1/Vogue Fashion Awards working with Gair on the video for No Doubt's song "New". Gair also worked on ad campaigns and for photo features in efforts to exhibit the artistic visions of others.

Eventually she expanded beyond make-up artistry to body painting to express her own artistic vision. In August 1991, Demi Moore caused international artistic commotion by appearing on the cover of Vanity Fair seven months pregnant with her daughter Scout LaRue in the photo More Demi Moore, with Gair as the make-up artist and Annie Leibovitz as the photographer. Exactly one year later, she returned to the cover of the same magazine nude as a product of Gair and Leibovitz in a nearly equally as shocking body painting, Demi's Birthday Suit. Gair was the primary body painter of this art and the magazine cover art propelled Gair to fame. Fifteen years later, it continues to be considered the most well-known example of modern body painting. The 1992 cover that entailed a thirteen-hour sitting for Gair and her team of make-up artists was a commemoration of the August 1991 photo. The shooting was storied because photographer Leibovitz could not decide where to shoot and reserved two mobile homes, four hotel rooms and five houses. The pop culture attention given to Gair and her body painting led Absolut Vodka to consider an Absolut Gair body painting promotion in 1993. In 1997, Gair also teamed with Rebecca Romijn and Dennis Rodman for a controversial bodypainting cover on GQ with Rodman's bodypainted hands on Romijn's breasts. The cover read "Dennis Rodman tries to get a grip on life, fame and career, but not on Rebecca Romijn." Home February 1997 edition subscribers received a total of 425,000 copies of the version with Gair's art, while 300,000 copies went to news stands with a more chaste version of the cover. Some vendors such as Wal-Mart refused to stock that edition.

Gair is considered a Trompe-l'œil body painter, but at times she describes herself more generally and colloquially as an illusionist. She also refers to herself and others refer to her as an image-maker for her contributions to people's perceptions of others. She was originally inspired to specialise in body painting by facial skin adornment of the indigenous Māori people of her native New Zealand. However, the glam rockers and heavy metal rockers as well as white-face geishas, Native American Indians and Indian mehndi all contributed to her inspiration. She began using Sharpies to draw on people in 1977. Her work, which became prominent with the August 1992 Vanity Fair cover of Demi Moore, has transcended various media and involved her with leading photographers, directors, super models and celebrities. Gair has worked with leading celebrities (Madonna, Cindy Crawford, Michelle Pfeiffer, Kim Basinger, Christina Aguilera, Gwyneth Paltrow, Sophia Loren and Celine Dion) and been in editorial (Vogue, W, Vanity Fair, Rolling Stone, Playboy, BlackBook, and Harper's Bazaar), fashion campaigns (Donna Karan, Versace, Victoria's Secret, Guess, and bebe), cosmetic companies (L'Oréal, Maybelline, Revlon, Oil of Olay, and Rimmel) and mega-brands such as Evian. At one point she was beauty editor of Black Book. Her work with Madonna includes music videos such as Express Yourself, Vogue, Fever, Rain, Frozen, the Blonde Ambition Tour and its subsequent feature documentary Truth or Dare. When Madonna teamed up with Herb Ritts for black and white photographs, Gair did the eyelashes and make-up. Gair has been the subject of numerous television programs and magazine articles, including what was the highest-rated episode of Ripley's Believe It or Not?. Her first retrospective was exhibited at the Auckland Museum as part of the Vodafone Body Art exhibition in 2001 and early 2002.

Gair has earned many motion picture credits for work as a make-up artist. In 1996 and 1997, she was employed on three of Moore's films (Striptease, If These Walls Could Talk & G.I. Jane). In addition, she earned a 1997 credit on Playboy: Farrah Fawcett, All of Me for Farrah Fawcett. In 2002, she earned a make-up credit on People I Know for working with Kim Basinger. She also earned a 2003 credit for work on the short documentary The Work of Director Chris Cunningham.

== Sports Illustrated ==
In her first year in the Swimsuit Issue (1999), she painted Rebecca Romijn, Heidi Klum, Sarah O'Hare, Michelle Behennah, Yamila Díaz-Rahi, and Daniela Peštová in a variety of beachware. The first Gair Sports Illustrated body paintings occurred at Richard Branson's Necker Island in the British Virgin Islands. Some of these also appeared in a 2001 Sports Illustrated calendar, and Heidi Klum's tie-dyed swimsuit bodypainting earned her and Gair the cover of the German edition of the Sports Illustrated Swimsuit Issue. In 2001, the Swimsuit Issue had a goddess theme. The cover featuring Elsa Benítez used the caption "Goddess of the Mediterranean". Gair contributed to this theme by body painting the models as statues of goddess: Klum (Athena), Díaz-Rahi (Thalia), Veronika Vařeková (Aphrodite, Venus), Molly Sims (Flora), Noémie Lenoir (Luna), Fernanda Tavares (Aurora), and Shakara Ledard (Diana) as goddesses. At about the same time in 2001, her work featuring Klum was featured on the cover of the tenth anniversary of Shape Magazine. In 2003, she painted a seven continent world map on Rachel Hunter, a fellow New Zealander, and purposely represented Australia and New Zealand "down under" (on the buttocks). In the 2004 issue, when she painted Jessica White, Petra Nemcova, Marisa Miller, Noemie Lenoir, Melissa Keller, and Hall, the paintings featured both body painting and real bathing suit portions in most images. However, bathing suit portions were not apparent in all images. In the 2005 issue, she painted Bridget Hall, White, Miller, Anne V, and Sarahyba with athletic team outfits. In the 2006 issue, she painted multiple bathing suits on Klum. One of these appeared on the cover of the German edition of Sports Illustrated. It was the ninth time that Gair and Klum worked together and the seventh time that they did so for Sports Illustrated. In the 2007 issue, where music was the theme and Beyoncé Knowles was featured on the cover, she painted rock and roll related tee shirts and bikini bottoms on Daniella Sarahyba, Miller, Praver and Ana Paula Araujo. In the 2008 Sports Illustrated Swimsuit Issue, when she painted bathing suits on Quiana Grant, Jessica Gomes, Marisa Miller, and Tori Praver, the average sitting time for the subjects/objects was thirteen hours.

The photographers in 1999, 2001, 2003 and 2004 were respectively Antoine Verglas, James Porto, Michael Zeppetello and Steven White for the Swimsuit Issue works. From 2005 to 2007 Gair took the photographs of her body paintings herself. Verglas again photographed the bodypainting for the 2008 Swimsuit Issue. No body painting pictures have been chosen as the exclusive main image on the cover of the Swimsuit Issue. However, in the 2005 Swimsuit Issue in which Carolyn Murphy is the cover model, Jessica White was shown as an inset on the cover in a Miami Dolphins jersey body painting by Gair. Thus, as a Sports Illustrated Swimsuit Issue photographer Gair debuted on the cover in a sense. In 2006 a small cropped portion of her photograph of a bodypainting of Klum appeared in an inset on the cover, but no bodypainting was apparent. The 2016 Swimsuit Issue designated three cover models for three separate covers, one of which was a photograph of Ronda Rousey in a Gair-painted one-piece bathing suit, thus making it the first Swimsuit bodypaint cover (albeit not the exclusive cover for that year).

One more round of bodypaint photos was done in 2017 (featuring models Anne de Paula, Hunter McGrady, Lisa Marie Jaftha, and McKenna Berkley); the magazine did not include a bodypaint feature in 2018 or 2019.

== Books ==
Gair has produced two English books: Paint A 'Licious: The Pain-Free Way to Achieving Your Naked Ambitions (ISBN 0-7407-5537-4, Andrews McMeel Publishing, 2005) and Body Painting: Masterpieces By Joanne Gair (with foreword by Heidi Klum) (ISBN 0-7893-1509-2, Universem, 2006) as well as one Spanish book: Arte en el cuerpo (ISBN 970-718-470-1, Numen, 2007). In her first book, Paint A 'Licious, she was both the painter and photographer as well as the arranger who conceived the scenes. Paint A 'Licious has a theme of helping people achieve their fantasies. Among the works included were one called It's a Stretch but You've Still Got It, which shows an older woman in a pink tutu doing the splits on a golden stage, with the help of an assistant painted to blend into the curtains and 'No Sweat' which shows an overweight woman happily leading an aerobics class with her body painted so that she appears 30 pounds slimmer. In the book, washboard abs are achieved by sitting still for a few hours, as is an hourglass figure. The book was produced over the course of ten months in New Zealand.

Her second book, Body Painting, includes seventy-five works and some of the photographers involved were Annie Leibovitz, Herb Ritts and David LaChapelle. The book includes many works from Gair's Auckland Museum exhibition as well as selected Swimsuit Issue images. Former model and current First Lady of France, Carla Bruni, was a subject of the book. Several Heidi Klum photos are included from various photo shoots, including the 1991 Shape magazine tenth anniversary shoot. Several photos of Demi Moore also appear including alternate photos from the Kauai, Hawaii portion of the 1992 Demi's Birthday Suit week of shooting as well as both photos of her 1994 pregnancy with Tallulah Belle Willis and subsequent 1995 Barbie body paintings. A photo from the Disappearing Model work from Ripley's Believe It or Not? is also included. The book also includes magazine work such as a May 1990 Fame shoot with Goldie Hawn and Matthew Rolston and a November 1998 Interview shoot with Pamela Anderson and David LaChapelle as well as some Pirelli calendar work with Herb Ritts, Carolyn Murphy and Alek Wek.

Sports Illustrated produced Sports Illustrated: In the Paint (ISBN 978-1-933821-20-7, Time, Inc. Home Entertainment, 2007) in November 2007. The book is subtitled The complete body-painting collection from the SI Swimsuit Issue: The Art of Joanne Gair. The book contains reproductions of photographs of all of the body paintings that have been included in the swimsuit issue since Gair has become involved and excludes all body painting that preceded Gair's involvement. Thus, she is the featured artist of the book that includes photographs by all of the aforementioned photographers. The book also contains stories that accompanied some of the issues by Sports Illustrated writers such as Rick Reilly who observed the process. The cover image of Sarah O'Hare was shot by Antoine Verglas who photographed Gair's 1999 bodypaintings for the Swimsuit Issue. The book includes images produced in Gair's earlier efforts for the Sports Illustrated Swimsuit Issue from 1999 to 2007. It also includes several behind-the-scenes images not include in the magazine.

== Television ==
Disappearing Model, 2000 has been mentioned as Gair's most famous work.

Although to many she is best known for Demi's Birthday Suit, art aficionados consider her most famous work Disappearing Model. The work appeared on Ripley's Believe it or Not!. In the trompe l'oeil body painting, the face and body of the model are almost indistinguishable from the red and blue and yellow flowers of the wallpaper in the background. Her first body paintings was also memorable as she painted a moko on a female Ford Modeling Agency fashion model named Jana, which is a tabooed employment of a traditionally male ritual face mask. An example from Gair's website of her ability to trick the eye into seeing a three-dimensional subject blend with a two-dimensional background is seen in a photograph of a pregnant Elle Macpherson. Other examples of this technique include the cover of her first book (pictured below) and images from within this book.

She participated in Germany's Next Topmodel by painting and photographing the final four contestants in leopard prints. During the episode, which was Cycle 1 episode 6, she handled two models per day working for six to seven hours with each. The works covered the shoulders, legs, breasts and stomach and included long hair extensions. The episode resulted in work that was so successful that none of the contestants were eliminated.

== Style ==
Gair has now developed a style as a body painter. Her typical job takes her and her team eight hours, but some jobs take twice that. She does not charge by the hour. Gair is always prepared for her jobs, but does not generally sketch her work on paper. In fact, she claims to have only had to do so twice in over twenty years of body painting. When she needs to test something out she usually uses her opposite (left) arm or hand.

In recent years, Gair has added photography to her professional skills. In addition to being the photographer of Paint A 'Licious, she has been the photographer in some years of her Sports Illustrated work. For example, she was the photographer of Heidi Klum in 2006. At the end of 2007, Gair was using a Canon 5D camera.

== Family ==
Gair is from Takapuna in the North Island of New Zealand, but she now lives in both Los Angeles and New York City. Her father was Hon. George Gair, a former New Zealand politician, and her nephew Alastair Gair is a competitive Etchells racer. Her father was a long-time Member of the Parliament of New Zealand (1966–1990) and later Mayor of North Shore City (1995–1998). Her mother was Fay Gair, and her elder sister Linda Gair served both as a model and as a painting assistant in several of the paintings in her first book. Linda also has a daughter named Lauren. One of the paintings for which Linda assisted was the cover of Paint A 'Licious. Gair also has an older brother named Warwick.
