= Ana Paula Araújo (model) =

Brazilian model (born 1981)

- Born: 25 October 1981 (age 44); Roraima, Brazil
- Modeling information
- Height: 5 ft 9.5 in (1.77 m)
- Hair color: Brown
- Eye color: Brown

Ana Paula Araújo (born 25 October 1981) is a Brazilian model who appeared in the 2007 Sports Illustrated Swimsuit Issue. In addition to working with world-class photographers on her SI shoots, she was the object/subject of Joanne Gair body painting works in the 2007 edition. She has also appeared in advertisements for Liz Claiborne.
