= Jessica Gomes =

Australian model and actress (born 1985)

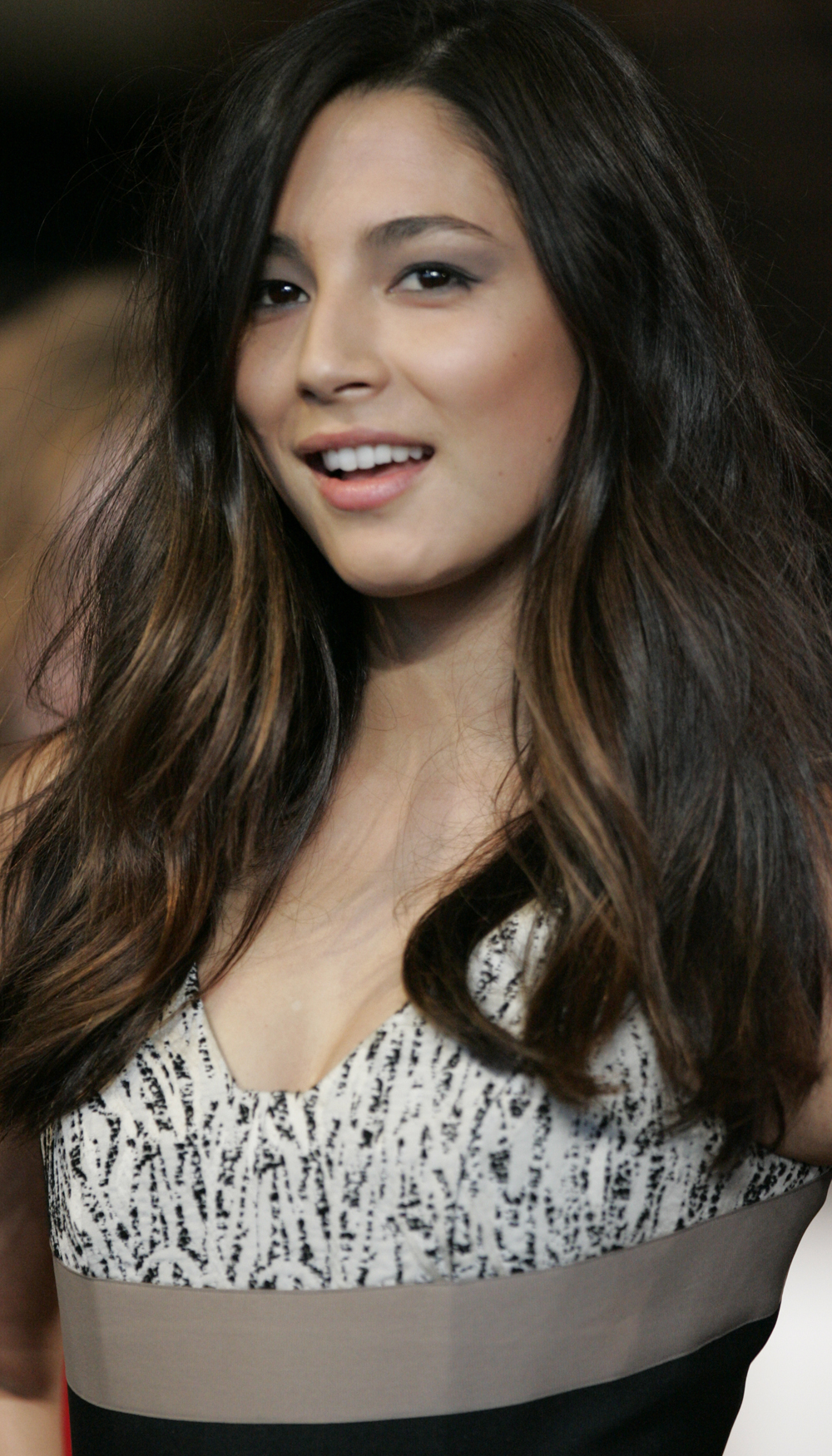
- Gomes at David Jones AW13 Fashion Launch (2013)
- Born: 25 September 1985 (age 41); Sydney, Australia
- Education: La Salle College
- Years active: 1996–present
- Modelling information
- Height: 1.76 m (5 ft 9 1/2 in)
- Hair colour: Dark Brown
- Eye colour: Brown
- Agency: Freedom Models (Los Angeles); IMG Models (Sydney)

Jessica Gomes (born 25 September 1985) is an Australian model who appeared in the Swimsuit Issue of the American publication Sports Illustrated every year from 2008 to 2015. She works extensively in Australia and Asia. Gomes was the featured spokesperson for David Jones from 2013 to Dec 2019. She has also been a spokesperson for South Korean conglomerates LG Electronics and Hyundai. Gomes served as the face of the Estee Lauder/Sean John fragrance "Unforgivable".

== Early life ==
She is the daughter of a Portuguese father, Joe Gomes (who spent time in Paris), and a Singaporean mother of Chinese descent, Jenny (who was born in Hong Kong but grew up in Singapore); both moved to Australia in the 1970s. She was born in Sydney and raised in Perth in a semi-rural environment as the youngest child in her family, with two older sisters and an older brother.

== Career ==
Gomes's mother sent her to modelling classes at Linda-Ann Model Academy in the Perth suburb of Midland at the age of 13. There her acting led to a modeling contest and the start of her career. In 2004, she signed with IMG Models after moving to New York City. She has avoided Paris and Milan and worked extensively in most of Asia's major markets — including Tokyo, Seoul, Hong Kong, Beijing, and Shanghai — where she feels mixed heritage models are more successful. According to Diane Smith, senior editor of the Sports Illustrated Swimsuit Issue, she is regarded as a "nontraditional" beauty and in her Australian homeland she is regarded for her multiracial background.

Gomes has enjoyed much success through South Korean advertising campaigns. In 2007 she appeared in advertisements for Hyundai Sonata. The following year, she appeared in an advertisement for LG Cyon Bikini Phone, in which she promoted the split screen cellphone wearing a two-piece bikini, under the tagline "Touch the Wonder." This ad campaign is credited as having pushed Gomes to stardom in South Korea. Her popularity grew, and by 2013 between her spokesmanships and Korean television show appearances, she had reached celebrity status.

Beyond her South Korean success, Gomes has appeared in Vogue, Teen Vogue, Glamour, American Glamour and Victoria's Secret catalogue, has modeled for DKNY Jeans, Garnier, Levi's, Motorola, Urban Outfitters and Victoria's Secret, and appeared on the cover of Biba. She signed with Estee Lauder as the face of Sean John's Unforgivable fragrance. She has been featured in ads for Jay-Z Rocawear. In 2009, she was in a Cass Beer ad campaign with Lee Min-ho. She was the Maxim Cover girl for November 2011. On Friday 22 March 2013, Gomes was announced as the fashion ambassador for Australian retail giant David Jones, replacing Miranda Kerr and joining Megan Gale, Jason Dundas, Montana Cox, Gai Waterhouse and Emma Freedman. That July, she debuted for David Jones on the runway. After Gomes became the face of Enprani Cosmetics, she launched a lip gloss named Gomes Pink. Gomes has also shot editorials for the Australian and Vietnamese editions of Harper's Bazaar and modelled for the cover of Cleo.

=== Public image ===
Gomes was listed at number 34, 8 and 94 in the 2012, 2013 and 2014 AskMen international poll of "world's most desirable women". She is listed at number 25 in the Maxim's Top 25 Hottest Females of 2012 and number 8 in Maxim Australia's Hot 100 of 2012. In 2013, she was listed at number 6.

By 2015 she had appeared in eight Sports Illustrated Swimsuit Issues (2008–2015).

In 2008, she was part of a record group of seven "rookie" Swimsuit Issue models, along with Quiana Grant, Melissa Haro, Yasmin Brunet, Melissa Baker, Jeisa Chiminazzo and Jarah Mariano. That year, she was featured in a bodypainting layout as a canvas for body-paint artist Joanne Gair. By the time of her fifth consecutive Swimsuit issue, she had surpassed all models of Asian heritage.

=== Acting ===
The modeling school in Midland that Gomes attended was also a child casting agency and in 1997, Gomes, along with many other students of the school, appeared as extras in the Australian miniseries The adventures of the Bush Patrol.

While she lived in New York City, she studied at the Stella Adler Studio of Acting. Her Chinese-Portuguese heritage has contributed to her popularity in the Asian market, and in 2009, her reality TV-show My Name Is Jessica Gomes was launched on the English language South Korean television network On Style owned by On-Media. In the show's second season it chronicled her time in New York.

She made her dancing debut in the Korean version of Dancing with the Stars on 10 June 2011. She placed third that season. In 2012, Gomes appeared in the 14th episode of the 7th cycle of Germany's Next Topmodel, teaching the candidates how to do jumping poses in fashion editorials.

Gomes appeared in the 2014 film Transformers: Age of Extinction, the 2017 films Once Upon a Time in Venice (starring Bruce Willis) and Father Figures (co-starring with Owen Wilson) and in the 2020 Netflix film Tigertail alongside John Cho.

=== Music ===
In January 2012, Gomes was revealed as the voice saying the name of Rick Ross's label Maybach Music Group at the beginning of certain tracks that the company produces. She is "name-dropped" in the Kanye West GOOD Fridays song "Christian Dior Denim Flow". Gomes participated as a celebrity driver in a promotional celebrity challenge racing event by Mazda associated with the 2013 Australian Grand Prix. In 2015, Gomes starred in Chinese Pop singer Z.Tao’s music video “Crown”.

== Personal life ==
One of Gomes' sisters, Bianca, was a successful model in Australia and overseas before Jessica began modeling seriously. She counts Australian Elle Macpherson and Chinese-born model China Machado, the latter of whom was the first model of colour to appear on the cover of an American fashion magazine, as her role models. She dined with Perth native and friend Heath Ledger in New York the day before he died.

In 2005, Gomes moved to New York City and was a flatmate of Gemma Ward. She formerly attended La Salle College. She continued to live in New York at the time of her Swimsuit Issue debut in 2008 and as late as 2011.

Prior to 2016, Jessica Gomes dated former Australian Rugby Union captain, Rocky Elsom.

From 2016 to 2018, Gomes was in a relationship with Xavier Samuel.
