= Tori Praver =

American model (born 1986)

- Born: Victoria Syde Praver; June 4, 1986 (age 40); San Diego, California, U.S.
- Other names: "Tori", "Tori Praver-Fuller"
- Occupation: Model
- Spouse: Mark Burnbaum (m. 2021)
- Children: 2
- Modeling information
- Height: 5 ft 11 in (1.80 m)
- Hair color: Blonde
- Eye color: Blue
- Agency: IMG Models (Worldwide); Uno Models (Barcelona); Modellink (Gothenburg); Place Models (Hamburg)
- Website: www.toripraver.com

Victoria Syde Praver (born 1986) is an American model and swimwear fashion designer perhaps best known for her appearances in the 2007–2009 Sports Illustrated Swimsuit Issue, as a Global Brand Ambassador for Billabong in 2009, and for being the youngest face of Guess in 2006, at the age of 17.

== Biography ==
Born in San Diego, California, and raised on the Hawaiian island of Maui, Praver's childhood was spent surfing, swimming and hanging out at local beaches with her friends. Discovered at age 13 at a Lahaina supermarket, Praver has gone on to work for Guess, Yamamay, Tally Weijl, and Liu-Jo. She has been on multiple covers of Cosmopolitan, Glamour, and Cover magazines. She made Sports Illustrated shoots and was the object/subject of Joanne Gair body painting works in the 2007 and 2008 editions and appeared again the following year in 2009.

Her initial career goals were to become a fashion designer and in 2009, Praver started her own line of swimwear, Tori Praver Swimwear. The successful swimwear line is sold through major retailers, boutiques and online. In 2013, she married long-time boyfriend and professional surfer Danny Fuller, they separated in June 2017. The former couple share a daughter, Ryan, born in 2013, and a son, Phoenix, born in 2016, and split their time between Hawaii, Malibu and New York.
