= Jennifer Loomis =

American photographer

Jennifer Loomis is a fine-art photographer and photojournalist, who is best known for depictions of pregnancy in art through photography.

== Early life ==
Loomis was born in Connecticut but lived all over the world as a child and young adult. She has resided in Virginia, Indiana, and Kansas, while living internationally in Japan, Indonesia, Singapore, and Kenya. Before becoming a photographer, Loomis was working in Annie Leibovitz's studio. There she witnessed a photo shoot of the pregnant Demi Moore to be featured in Vanity Fair. This photo shoot was an inspiration for Loomis to explore the beauty in the changing bodies of pregnant women.

== Career ==
By 2006, she had photographed over 1000 pregnant women. Loomis compiled photographs to create a book, Portraits of Pregnancy, co-authored by Hugo Kugiya, a journalist. Ricki Lake and Abby Epstein, authors of Your Best Birth, claim, “Jennifer Loomis’s evocative and moving portraits of pregnancy are a joy to behold. The images will captivate you and the stories of these women’s diverse journeys to motherhood will touch your heart.”

== Publicity ==
Loomis and her work as a pregnancy photographer have been featured in TIME Magazine, CBS News, CBS's The Morning Show, The New York Times, The Wall Street Journal, The Los Angeles Times, the Associated Press, Fit Pregnancy, Pregnancy Magazine, NPR, Good Morning America, and Inside Edition, along with other media.

== Exhibitions ==
Loomis has had her work included in a variety of exhibitions. In 2004, her photography was included in the exhibition "We are Family: Portraits of Gay and Lesbian Parents," at 2223 Restaurant in the Castro District, San Francisco. In 2011, Loomis had her work exhibited in Perugia, Italy in a museum of contemporary art called Palazzo Della Penna.

== Works ==
Portraits of Pregnancy:Birth of a Mother ISBN 1-59181-082-5
