= Quiana Grant =

American model (born 1982)

- Born: March 21, 1982 (age 44); Newport News, Virginia, U.S.
- Modeling information
- Height: 5 ft 10.5 in (1.79 m)
- Hair color: Black
- Eye color: Black
- Agency: IMG Models (New York, Paris, London, Sydney)

Quiana Grant is an American model who appeared in the 2008 Sports Illustrated Swimsuit Issue. She was featured in a bodypainting layout as a canvas for bodypaint artist Joanne Gair who is in her tenth year of producing bodypaint art for the Swimsuit Issue. She was part of a record-setting class of seven rookie Swimsuit Issue models along with Jessica Gomes, Melissa Haro, Yasmin Brunet, Melissa Baker, Jeisa Chiminazzo and Jarah Mariano.

== Biography ==
Grant attended Menchville High School and graduated in 1999. She now lives Harlem in New York, New York, but she considers Newport News, Virginia, to be her hometown. Although Grant was highly sought after for modeling at age 14, she stayed in school until age 16. At age 16, while her mother underwent a series of eye surgeries, she served as her mother's eyes. Her mother had chorioretinitis and could not even recognize Grant until she was 13. Her parents are Tony and Regina Grant, and she has a younger brother.

== Experience ==
Grant was twenty-six years old with over ten years of modeling experience at the time of the release of her debut in the Sports Illustrated Swimsuit Issue. She has modelled for GAP (photos by Steven Meisel) and Maybelline ad campaigns as well as done runway work for numerous leading fashion houses and designers such as Karl Lagerfeld, Michael Kors, Anne Klein and Bill Blass. She is represented by IMG in New York, Modelwerk in Germany, City Models in Paris, France, as well as Vision Model Management.
