= Demi's Birthday Suit =

1992 photograph by Annie Leibovitz

Demi's Birthday Suit, August 1992.

Demi's Birthday Suit, or The Suit, was a trompe-l'œil body painting by Joanne Gair photographed by Annie Leibovitz that was featured on the cover of the Vanity Fair August 1992 issue to commemorate and exploit the success of Leibovitz's More Demi Moore cover photo of Demi Moore one year earlier. As an example of modern body painting artwork, it raised the profile of Gair in pop culture as an artist in that genre.

The work is considered to be groundbreaking by some, although there is controversy surrounding its originality. The converse of this image serves as the dust jacket art to Gair's second bodypainting book, Body Painting. The photo shoot also let Moore show off the results of her fitness regimen.

== Artistic perspective ==
Gene Newman considers the body painting of Moore to be the introduction of modern body painting to the world. Although willing to credit Moore and Gair with the rebirth of bodypainting in a San Francisco Chronicle story, the "makeup artist, wig maker and stylist" Jim Ponder had difficulty calling interest in bodypainting a trend because it traces back to the "beginnings of man." Joanne Gair has described the painting as a stylized reference to Botticelli, since the sinuous pose is reminiscent of the central figures in both Primavera and The Birth of Venus. The Amazon.com product description for Gair's book calls her participation in this photoshoot as her "defining moment." Soon after the release of the magazine Gair became such a pop culture icon that she was considered for an Absolut Vodka Absolut Gair ad campaign according to a story in The New York Times. The work is considered to be an example from the most sophisticated end of the bodypainting spectrum which extends all the way to Henna tattoos.

Some sources have claimed that the work is a derivative of preceding works. Playboy published a photo with similar bodypainting, with a necktie, suit jacket and similar pose, in its March 1968 issue, as part of a feature on bodypainting.

== Details ==
Gair had worked with Leibovitz and Moore on More Demi Moore. Departing Vanity Fair editor Tina Brown felt "The only thing to do for the anniversary cover was to reprise it." According to a Houston Chronicle story that quotes both Moore and Brown, about 100 million people had seen the earlier cover, and this cover capitalized on the anniversary.

They decided to attempt a body painting during the week-long shoot at the Chateau Marmont in Los Angeles, California in 1992. Gair was provided with a pinstriped three-piece suit by Richard Tyler as a model to paint onto Moore. Since in those days she did not generally work with assistants, the day started at 6:30 A.M. and Demi Moore slept that night in the painted-on suit in case they needed to resume the next day. It took 15 hours to apply the suit because it was difficult for Gair to build the proper paint density. Moore's body heat melted the paint. For the 1992 cover, which required a full-day sitting for Gair and her team of make-up artists, Leibovitz could not decide where to shoot, and "reserved two mobile homes, four hotel rooms and five houses". Stylist Lori Goldstein assisted with the application.

Having started rigorous workouts in the final trimester of her pregnancy the year before to prepare for her role in A Few Good Men, Moore was physically fit for the photoshoot. Thus she appeared in additional nude photos within the magazine's cover story. Moore viewed the photos as a chance to show off the results of her workouts: "I said I would get better with each baby and I have." The weeklong effort also involved shots taken in Kauai, Hawaii that are included in Gair's second book, Body Painting. Moore felt she looked better on the cover at age 29 than she had in a bikini nine years earlier in Blame It on Rio.

== More Demi Moore ==
Demi Moore had appeared on the cover of Vanity Fair exactly one year earlier in the August 1991 edition in Leibovitz's photograph, More Demi Moore. As a groundbreaking work, the photograph of her pregnant pose was an iconic one for Moore, Leibovitz and women in general who now view public representation of pregnancy as socially acceptable. It had a cultural impact by causing numerous celebrities to pose for photographs in advanced pregnancy, which has made pregnancy photos fashionable and created a profitable business for photographers such as Jennifer Loomis. The American Society of Magazine Editors regards it as one of the best U.S. magazine covers ever, and it is one of Leibovitz' best-known works. Additionally, the photo served as a litmus test when Internet decency standards were first being legislated and adjudicated.
