= More Demi Moore =

1991 photograph by Annie Leibovitz

August 1991 More Demi Moore cover

More Demi Moore or the August 1991 Vanity Fair cover is a controversial handbra nude photograph of then seven-months pregnant Demi Moore taken by Annie Leibovitz for the August 1991 cover of Vanity Fair to accompany a cover story about Moore.

The cover has had a lasting societal impact. Since the cover was released, several celebrities have posed for photographs in advanced stages of pregnancy, although not necessarily as naked as Moore. This trend has made pregnancy photos fashionable and created a booming business. The photograph is one of the most highly regarded magazine covers of all time, and it is one of Leibovitz's best known works.

The picture has been parodied several times, including for advertising Naked Gun 33 1/3: The Final Insult (1994). This led to the 1998 Second Circuit fair use case Leibovitz v. Paramount Pictures Corp. In addition to being satirically parodied and popularizing pregnancy photographs, there was also backlash. Some critics rated it grotesque and obscene, and it was also seriously considered when Internet decency standards were first being legislated and adjudicated. Others thought it was a powerful artistic statement.

In each of the subsequent two years, Moore made follow-up cover appearances on Vanity Fair, the first of which propelled Joanne Gair to prominence as a trompe-l'œil body painter.

== Background ==
In 1991, Demi Moore was a budding A-list film star who had been married to Bruce Willis since 1987. The couple had had their first child Rumer Willis in 1988, and they had hired three photographers for an audience of six friends for the delivery. In 1990, she had starred in that year's highest-grossing film, Ghost, for which she was paid $750,000, and she had earned $2.5 million for 1991 roles in The Butcher's Wife and Mortal Thoughts. Following the photo, she would earn $3 million for A Few Good Men and $5 million apiece for Indecent Proposal (1993), Disclosure (1994) and The Scarlet Letter (1995).

Annie Leibovitz had been chief photographer at Rolling Stone from 1973 until 1983, when she moved to Vanity Fair. In 1991, she had the first mid-career show, Annie Leibovitz Photographs 1970-1990, ever given to a photographer by the National Portrait Gallery in Washington, D.C., with a similarly titled accompanying book. The show traveled to New York City at the International Center of Photography for a showing that would run until December 1, 1991.

== Details ==
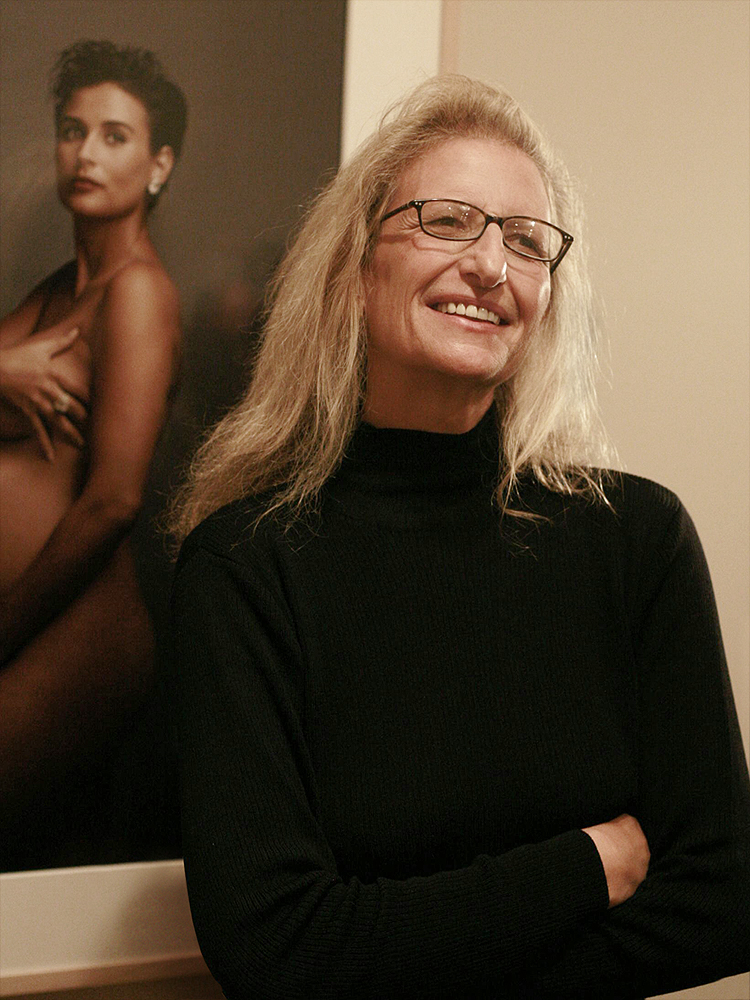
Leibovitz in 2008 standing in front of her More Demi Moore photo

The photograph was one of several taken by Leibovitz of 28-year-old Moore, then seven-months pregnant with the couple's second daughter, Scout LaRue Willis. The photographs ranged from Moore in lacy underwear and spiked high heels, to a revealing peignoir. The final selection had Moore wearing only a diamond ring. Joanne Gair was the makeup artist for the shoot. Samuel Irving Newhouse, Jr., chairman of Conde Nast Publications, was very supportive of the cover despite the potential for lost sales. Tina Brown, Vanity Fair editor, quickly realized that there would be harsh backlash for regular distribution of the magazine; the issue had to be wrapped in a white envelope with only Moore's eyes visible. Some editions had a brown wrapper that implied naughtiness. However, Brown viewed the image as a chance to make a statement about the decade of the 1990s after a decade dominated by power suits. Approximately 100 million people saw the cover.

The use of a pregnant sex symbol was in a sense an attempt to combat the pop culture representations of the anathema of the uncomfortable and grotesquely excessive female form in a culture that values thinness. Leibovitz' candid portrayal drew a wide spectrum of responses from television, radio, and newspaper personalities and the public at large ranging from complaints of sexual objectification to celebrations of the photograph as a symbol of empowerment. One of the judges in Leibovitz v. Paramount Pictures Corp. stated that the image evoked Botticelli's Birth of Venus. The retrospective view of some was that the photograph is "high art". The intent of the photograph was to portray pregnancy with a celebrity in a way that was bold and understated in an "anti-Hollywood, anti-glitz" manner. It was successful in some regards as many perceived it as a statement of beauty and pride. However, many took offense and the cover drew unusually intense controversy for Vanity Fair in the form of ninety-five television spots, sixty-four radio shows, 1,500 newspaper articles, and a dozen cartoons. Some stores and newsstands refused to carry the August issue, while others concealed it in the wrapper evocative of porn magazines.

The photo is not only considered one of Leibovitz's most famous, but also an almost mythical representation. It is considered emblematic of Si Newhouse's reputation for "newsy features and provocative photos." It is the first photo mentioned in the New York Times review of Leibovitz's exhibition Annie Leibovitz: A Photographer's Life, 1990-2005 at the Brooklyn Museum and it is contrasted with another of her female pregnancy photographs (of Melania Trump).

A year later, Moore still did not understand the controversy that caused photos of a naked, pregnant woman to be viewed as morally objectionable. Moore stated that, "I did feel glamorous, beautiful and more free about my body. I don't know how much more family oriented I could possibly have gotten." She considered the cover to be a healthy "feminist statement." In 2007, Moore stated that the picture was not originally intended for publication. She had posed in a personal photo session, not a cover shoot. Leibovitz has had personal photo sessions of Moore and all of her daughters.

=== Cover story ===
One journalist's professional account of the cover story describes it as "relentlessly long", and a second journalist's description is that it is a "very long profile". The article discussed the then three-year-old Rumer Willis and husband Bruce Willis. Willis and Moore discuss each other in the article. The article also spends three pages recounting her life. The article spent little time on her next film, The Butcher's Wife, or the child she was pregnant with, Scout Willis.

== Legal issues ==
Leslie Nielsen in the Naked Gun 33 1/3: The Final Insult advertisement

=== Naked Gun 33 1/3 ===
The photograph was parodied on several occasions, including the computer-generated Spy magazine version, which placed Willis' head on Moore's body. In Leibovitz v. Paramount Pictures Corp., Leibovitz sued over one parody featuring Leslie Nielsen, made to promote the 1994 film Naked Gun 33 1/3: The Final Insult. In the parody, the model's body was used and "the guilty and smirking face of Mr. Nielsen appeared above". The teaser said "Due this March". The case was dismissed in 1996 because the parody relied "for its comic effect on the contrast between the original".

In a parody ruling, the court must determine whether a work is transformative in a way that gives a new expression, meaning or message to the original work. In this case, the court ruled that the "ad may reasonably be perceived, as commenting on the seriousness and even pretentiousness of the original." It also ruled that the ad differed from the original "in a way that may, reasonably, be perceived as commenting, through ridicule on what a viewer might reasonably think is the undue self-importance conveyed by the subject of the Leibovitz photograph."

=== Other issues ===
When the Internet arose as a popular and important medium and the United States Supreme Court issued a ruling on the Communications Decency Act of 1996 (CDA), Moore's image was described as a sort of litmus test to determine if the law could be reasonably applied in the current environment by the trial court. When John Paul Stevens rendered an opinion over a year later, the image was still on the minds of legal scholars.

== Follow-ups ==
In the Demi's Birthday Suit August 1992 issue of Vanity Fair, Moore was shown on the cover in the body painting photo by Joanne Gair. It made Gair an immediate pop culture star as the most prominent body paint artist, which prompted consideration for an Absolut Vodka Absolut Gair ad campaign. The 1992 cover, which required a thirteen-hour sitting for Gair and her team of make-up artists, was a commemoration of the August 1991 photo. Leibovitz could not decide where to shoot, and reserved two mobile homes, four hotel rooms and five houses.

In December 1993, Moore was again on the cover of Vanity Fair, but this time she was dressed in two straps and a large red bow and was sitting on David Letterman's lap while he was dressed up as Santa Claus.

Other celebrities have since posed nude or semi-nude while in advanced pregnancy, including Christina Aguilera and Britney Spears whose billboard advertisements led to great controversy. Newsweek referred to the pose more than a decade later, and The New York Times coined "demiclad" for the nude pregnant handbra pose. Eventually, Vogue and Harper's Bazaar included pregnant cover models, and Star included a pregnant foursome of Katie Holmes, Gwen Stefani, Gwyneth Paltrow and Angelina Jolie. They also had a "Bump Brigade" of Jennie Garth, Maggie Gyllenhaal and Sofia Coppola. Vogue had a very pregnant 37-year-old Brooke Shields on the cover of its April 2003 issue. By the time Linda Evangelista appeared pregnant (and clothed) on the August 2006 cover of Vogue, pregnancy was not the emphasis of the story. However, even at the end of 2007 appearing bare-bellied and pregnant on the cover of a magazine, as Aguilera did for Marie Claire, was still considered a derivative of Moore's original. When Melania Trump appeared in American Vogue, she held in esteem as a model of maternity fashion by Anna Wintour. A commemoration of the photo was a self-portrait by Leibovitz in which she appeared in profile and pregnant for her A Photographer's Life exhibition. Myleene Klass posed for a similar nude pregnant photo for Glamour magazine in 2007.

Serena Williams appeared pregnant in very nearly the same pose on the cover of the August 2017 issue of Vanity Fair, 26 years after the August 1991 cover featuring pregnant Demi Moore.

== Legacy ==
The photo has had long cultural and social impact in the U.S. Many women feel that the rush of celebrities taking pregnant photos has made taking such photos glamorous for pregnant mothers. As the photos have become more common on magazine covers the business of documenting pregnancies photographically has boomed. Furthermore, the photo is critically acclaimed. Almost fifteen years after its publication the American Society of Magazine Editors listed it as the second best magazine cover of the last forty years.

In 2023 Glamour recreated a version of the image featuring Logan Brown, a pregnant transgender man.

=== Parodies ===
Two months after the photo's publication, it was parodied by Marvel Comics on the cover of The Sensational She-Hulk #34 in October 1991. The cover features She-Hulk, a character known for breaking the fourth wall and parodying pop culture, in the same pose as Moore with a green beach ball in place of the baby bump, while telling the reader "It's not fair to accuse me of vanity! I just thrive on controversy!" Marvel parodied the photo again on the cover of Quasar #29 in December 1991; this time with Wendell Vaughn posing as pregnant with the tag line: "Momma never said there'd be days like this!"

In 2006, graffiti artist Banksy used a Simpsons-like character to replace Moore's head for a promotion in Los Angeles, California. He illegally posted the parody around Los Angeles to promote his website and his exhibition.

== See also ==
- List of photographs considered the most important
- Pregnancy fetishism
