= Gaudenzio Marconi =

Italian photographer

- Born: 12 March 1841; Comologne, Switzerland
- Died: 1885 (aged 43–44); Schaerbeek, Belgium
- Known for: Photography; painting
- Movement: Academic art
- Spouse: Adrienne Fontaine (born 1844)
- Patrons: Auguste Rodin

Gaudenzio Marconi (12 March 1841, Comologne, Switzerland – 1885, Schaerbeek, Belgium) was a Swiss/Italian photographer who later worked in France and Belgium.

== Early life ==
Born into a family of probable Italian origin on 12 March 1841 in Comologne, in French-speaking Switzerland. He married Adrienne Fontaine (born Amsterdam, 1844).

== Paris ==
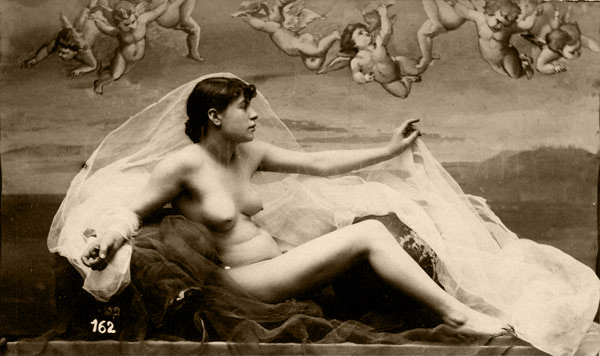
Allegorical nude

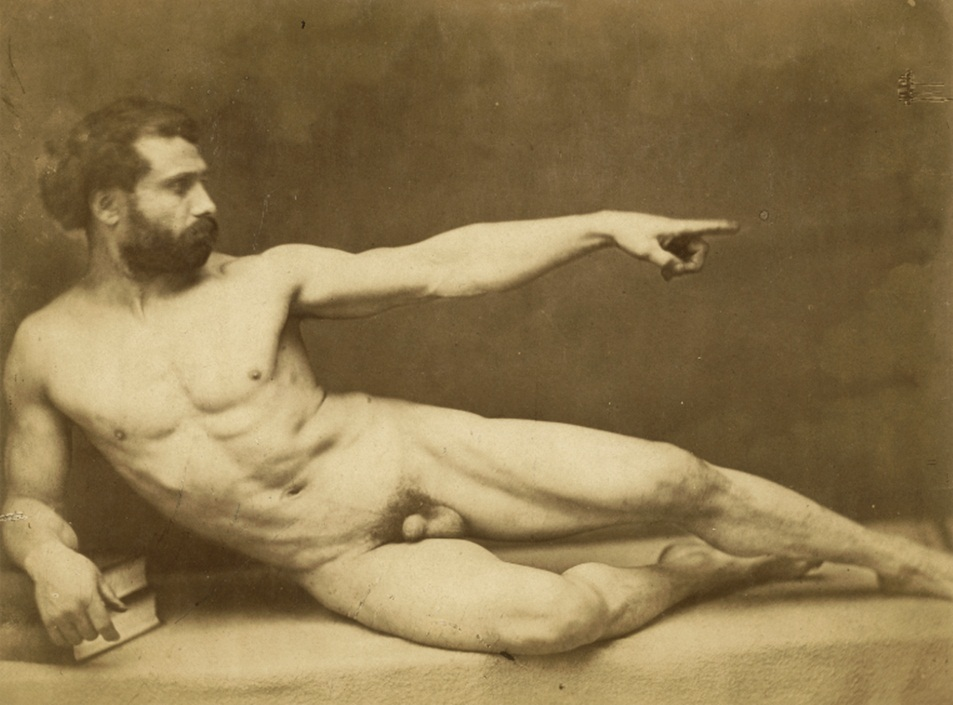
Academic nude

In 1862, Marconi is recorded as an "artist-painter" with a studio at 11 rue de Buci. A skilled photographer, he acquired the Paris studio, and some of the merchandise, abandoned by Joseph Auguste Belloc in 1868, and listed himself in the Paris directory as a photographer specialising in studies for artists, sold as académies (photographic figure studies), of nude men, women, and children. In 1869, he registered his photographs in the depot legale or copyright office through which the government censorship administration approved photographs for sale. He marketed them, and some later attributed to his Austrian colleague Hermann Heid, to students at the École des beaux-arts (School of Fine Arts) in Paris.

The Marconi collection of albumen prints from wet collodion plates are among the best-known of this type of nude which relate to tableaux vivants and which imitated celebrated works of classical antiquity and Renaissance art recognisable immediately by the viewer, or at least with some certainty. Backgrounds and props were kept minimal, as they would be in a life studio, to support their identification as artists' reference material, rather than intended as pornography. Accomplished artists and students often sketched the figure from photographs when living models were not available or proved too costly. Marconi's photographs were used by famous artists to whom he offered allegorical nudes with indicative titles: "a Michelangelo" and one "a P.P. Rubens", or "a tribal woman". The académies are thus a special form of the tableaux vivants in terms of meaning and artistic purpose, and were not officially regarded as pornographic, although they clandestinely had such a market.

== Style ==
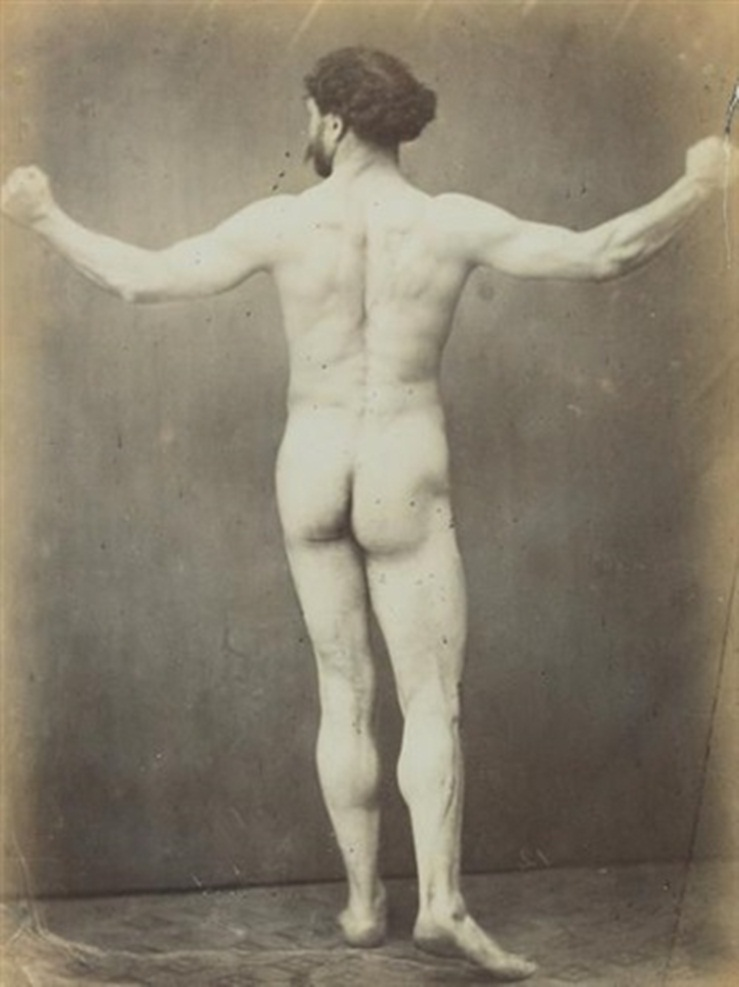
Male nude c. 1870

Cavatorta notes that his subjects were often male, whereas others photographed only female models:

The compositions he created show particular attention to the plastic quality of the bodies, with a clear intent of highlighting the movements of the muscle masses. The subjects are almost always photographed against neutral backgrounds or simple landscape backdrops, making very little use of decorations or props except for a few essential drapes. The Michelangelo-style representation of the vigor and volume of the bodies comes through forcefully—contrary to the works of other artists—and excludes any evocation of unreal atmospheres or the adoption of sensual poses.

== Censorship ==
Marconi fell foul of more strictly enforced French censorship laws imposed between 1871 and 1877, under the conservative regime of President MacMahon. From April 1871, even académies were forbidden to be displayed in the public spaces of Paris; thus even photographic reproductions of paintings of nudes that had been publicly displayed in the Salon and the Louvre were restricted, so that photographs of Bouguereau's Birth of Venus, Boucher's Venus and Adonis, Ingres' Roger Rescuing Angelica and Regnault's Three Graces produced by Goupil and other firms, while approved for sale, could not be displayed in shop windows. On 1 July 1873, in the seventh chamber of the Tribunal correctionnel de Paris, Marconi was convicted of crimes against public morality.

== Brussels ==
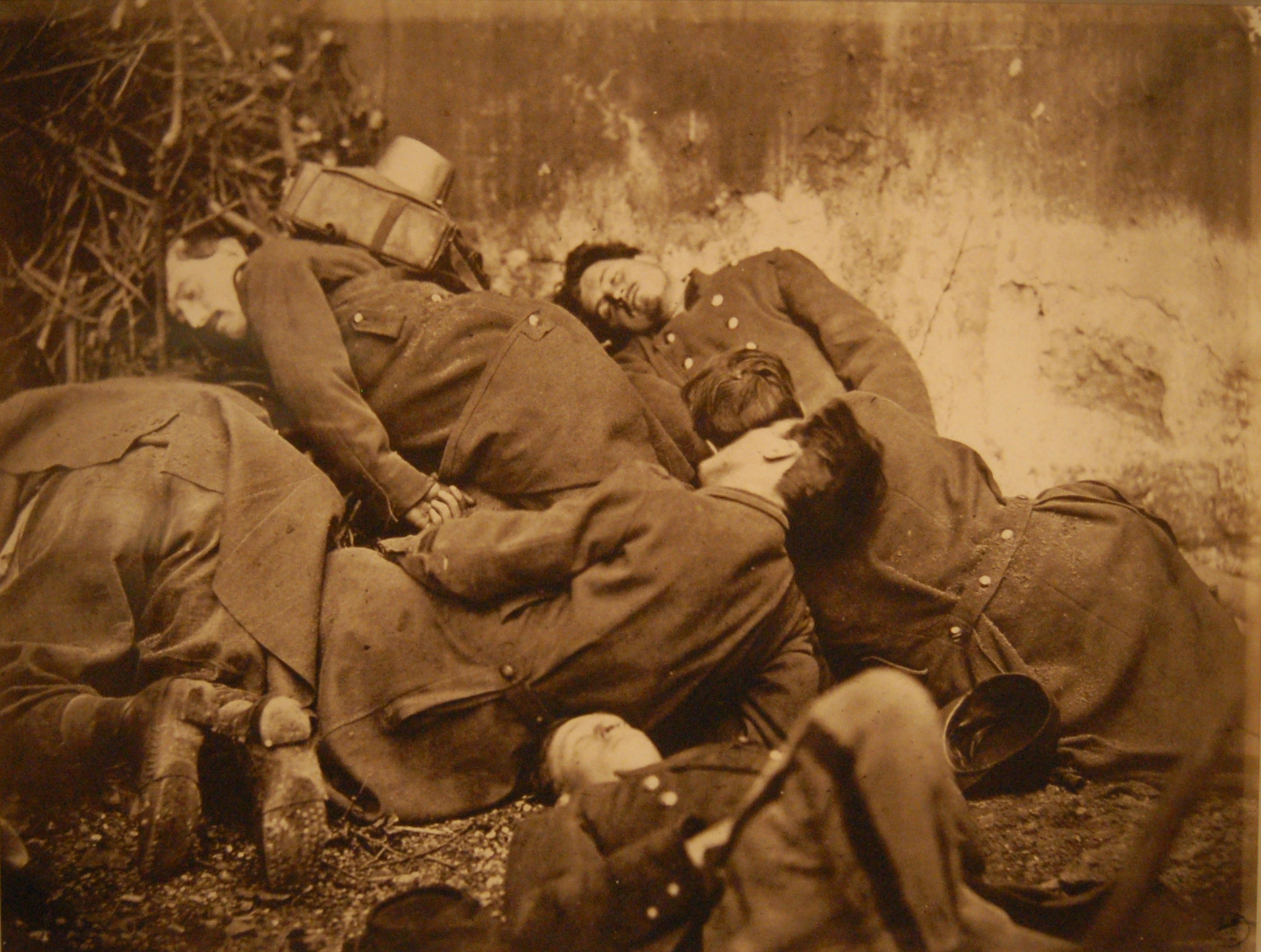
Bodies of soldiers of the Paris Commune (1871)

In 1871, Marconi staged in his studio several scenes of episodes from the siege of Paris. Due to the Franco-Prussian wars Marconi relocated to Brussels where he continued to produce and distribute photography of similar subjects. He opened a studio at first in place du Grand-Sablon, and from 22 September 1876 in the rue du Commerce.

== Rodin ==
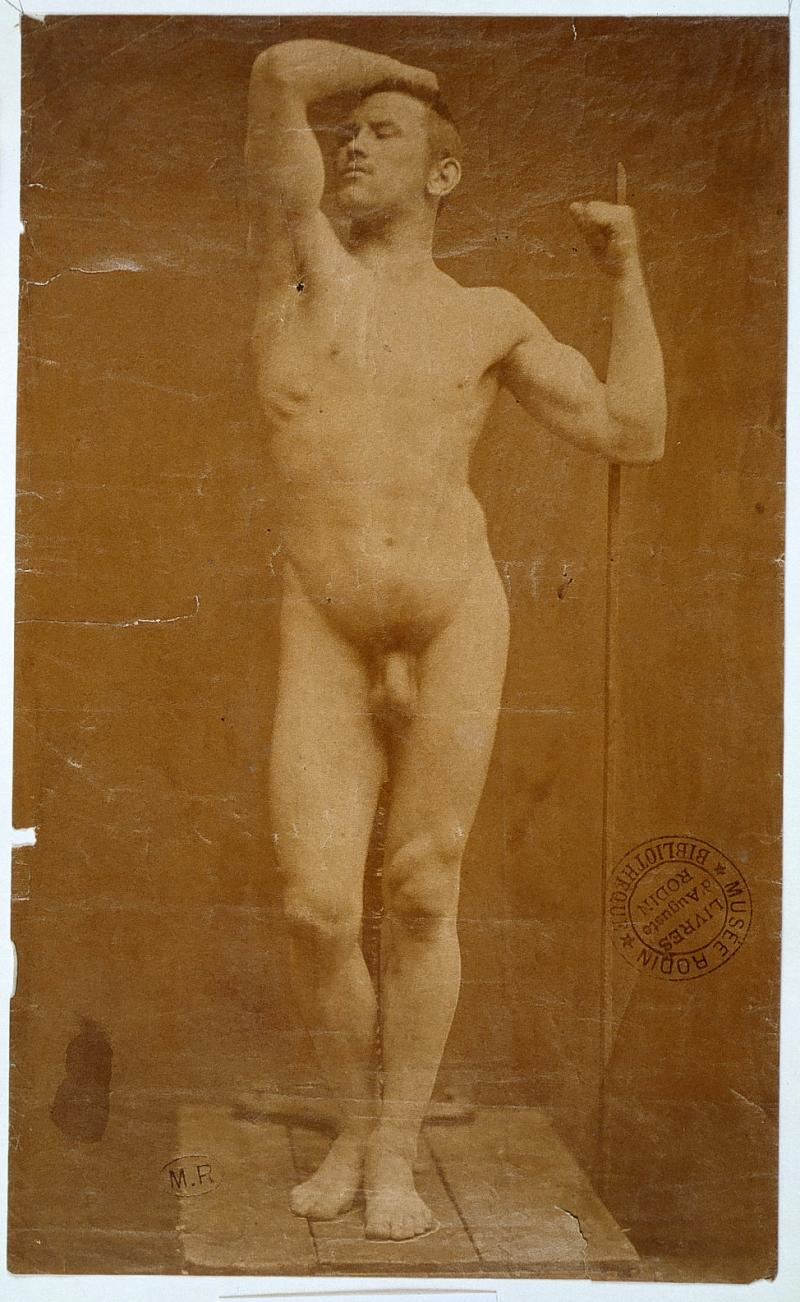
Auguste Neyt, model for Rodin's L'Âge d'airain, stamped albumen print (1877)

Notably, Marconi collaborated with the sculptor Auguste Rodin, for whom he posed the soldier August Neyt, rather than a professional model, for the creation of the 1877 L'Âge d'airain (The Age of Bronze). Rodin also commissioned Marconi for a photographic reproduction of the finished work, in its preview in Brussels in January 1877 prior to its submission to the Salon of Paris.

The Rodin Museum holds two reproductions of L'Âge d'airain (front and back views) labelled with Marconi's stamp with the studio address "Place Grand Sablon 19, Bruxelles", as well as two standing portraits of the model. Other photographs there by Marconi are marked extensively with cuts and over-drawings in pencil made by Rodin in working from these images.

== Later life ==
On 23 July 1879, Marconi moved to Schaerbeek, on the outskirts of Brussels, and remained there working in rue Potter 5 as both a painter and photographer until his death in 1885.

== Bibliography ==
- De Decker-Heftler, Sylviane (1985). "Suite Marconi 1. La Piste belge". Photographies (in French). 7: 110–112.
- Joseph, Steven F.; Schwilden, Tristan; Claes, Marie-Christine (1997). "Marconi Gaudenz[io]". Directory of Photographers in Belgium, 1839–1905. Rotterdam/Antwerpen: Ed. De Vries/Museum voor Fotografie. p. 271.
