= Danny Fuller (surfer) =

American surfer (born 1982)

Daniel Fuller
- Born: February 15, 1982 (age 44); Hanalei, Kauai, Hawaii, U.S.
- Occupation: Surfer
- Surfing career
- Nickname: "Danny"
- Years active: 1992–present
- Height: 6 ft 1 in (1.85 m)
- Weight: 175 lb (79 kg)
- Sport: Surfing

Surfing specifications
- Stance: Goofy
- Shaper: Michael Barron
- Quiver: 5’10” x 20 3/4” x 2 5/8” (Campbell Brothers Bonzer, Octafish Model), 5’10” (Joel Tudor surfboards single fin), 11’7” (Bret Surfboards pintail quad), 5’9” x 19 1/2” x 2 3/8” (Byrne Surfboards, Peanut round pin)

Danny Fuller (born February 15, 1982) is a Pipeline surfer ranked 527th in the world.

He was married to Tori Praver, a model and swimwear designer; they separated in June 2017. The couple have a daughter, Ryan, and a son, Phoenix.
