= Annie Leibovitz =

American photographer (born 1949)

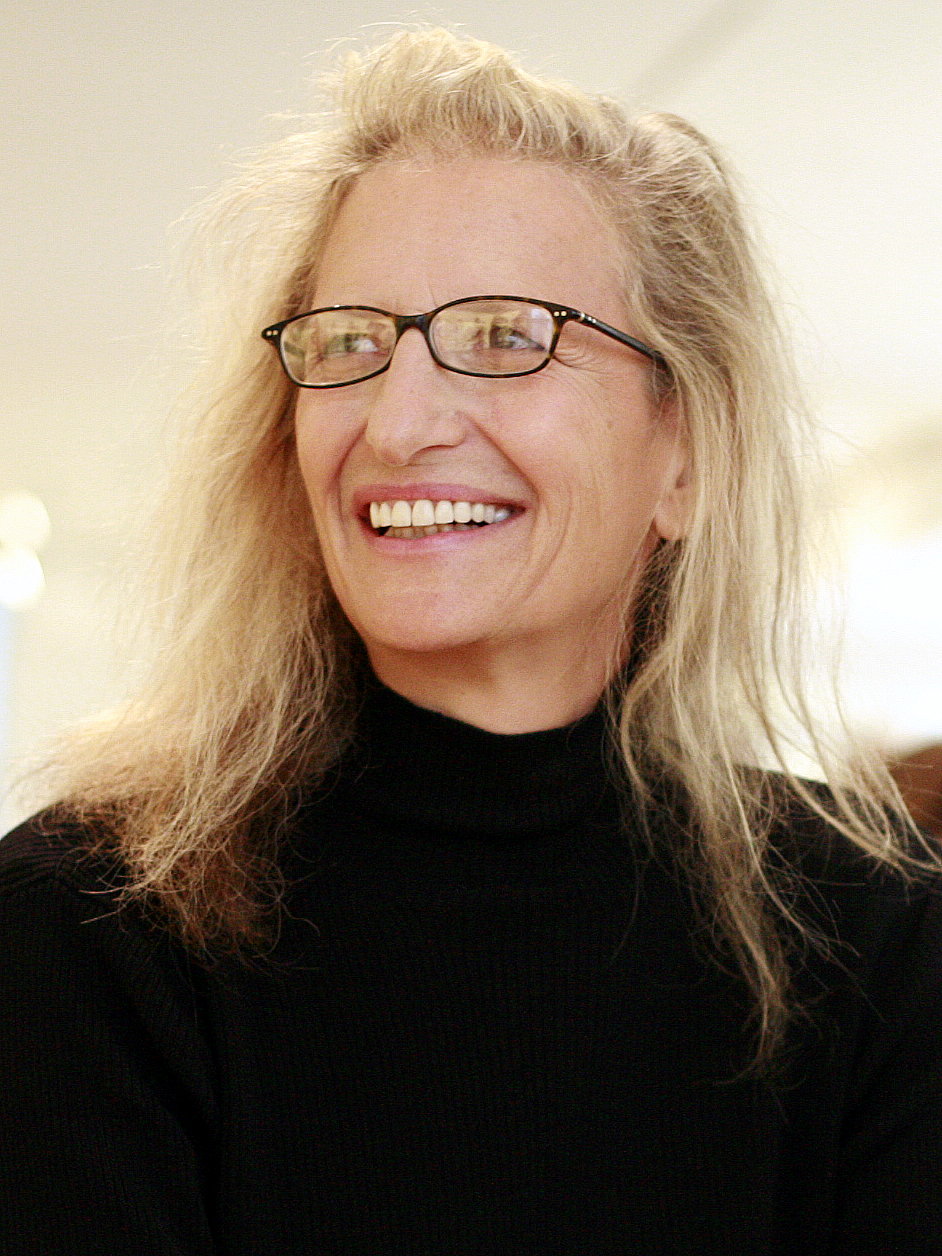
- Leibovitz in 2008
- Born: Anna-Lou Leibovitz; October 2, 1949 (age 77); Waterbury, Connecticut, U.S.
- Education: San Francisco Art Institute
- Occupations: Photographer; visual artist
- Partner(s): Susan Sontag (1989–2004; Sontag's death)
- Children: 3
- Awards: Commandeur, Ordre des Arts et des Lettres

Anna-Lou Leibovitz (/ˈliːbəvɪts/ LEE-bə-vits; born October 2, 1949) is an American portrait photographer best known for her portraits, particularly of celebrities, which often feature subjects in intimate settings and poses. Leibovitz's Polaroid photo of John Lennon and Yoko Ono, taken five hours before Lennon's murder, is considered one of Rolling Stone magazine's most famous cover photographs. The Library of Congress declared her a Living Legend, and she is the first woman to have a feature exhibition at Washington's National Portrait Gallery.

Leibovitz was a student in the 1970s when her photos were published for the first time: pictures of Vietnam War protesters in Israel, taken on assignment for Rolling Stone, one of which landed on the cover. Since then, she has captured film stars, politicians, athletes, royalty and artists for features and cover stories in other major publications, including Vanity Fair, Vogue and Time.

== Early life and education ==
Born in Waterbury, Connecticut, on October 2, 1949, Anna-Lou Leibovitz is the third of six children of Marilyn Edith (née Heit) and Samuel Leibovitz. She is a third-generation American. Her father was a lieutenant colonel in the U.S. Air Force of Romanian-Jewish heritage and her mother was a modern dance instructor of Estonian-Jewish heritage. Her love for photography began at a young age when her father gave her a camera. The family moved frequently with her father's duty assignments, and she took her first pictures when he was stationed in the Philippines during the Vietnam War. After her family returned from the Philippines, she attended the San Francisco Art Institute, where she studied painting and photography. Leibovitz's passion for art was born out of her mother's engagement with dance, music, and painting.

While attending Northwood High School in Silver Spring, Maryland, she became interested in various artistic endeavors and began to write and play music.

Leibovitz attended the San Francisco Art Institute, where she studied painting with the intention of becoming an art teacher. At school, she had her first photography workshop and changed her major to photography. She was inspired by the work of Robert Frank and Henri Cartier-Bresson. For several years, she continued to develop her photography skills while holding various jobs, including a stint on a kibbutz in Amir, Israel, for several months in 1969. Leibovitz attended the San Francisco Art Institute from 1967 until 1971. By the time Leibovitz received her bachelor of fine arts degree in 1971, her photographs of Israel and a picture of the poet Allen Ginsberg at a San Francisco peace march had already landed her a job at the music magazine Rolling Stone.

== Career ==
For many years, Leibovitz's camera of choice was a Mamiya RZ67. She also has used the following cameras:

- Hasselblad 500 C/M
- Minolta SRT-101
- Nikon D810
- Fuji 6×9 medium format camera (a.k.a. The 'Texas Leica')
- Canon 5D Mark II
- Hasselblad H5D

=== 1970–1980 ===
==== Rolling Stone ====
When Leibovitz returned to the United States in 1970, she started her career as staff photographer for Rolling Stone magazine. In 1973, publisher Jann Wenner named Leibovitz chief photographer of Rolling Stone, a job she would hold for 10 years. Leibovitz worked for the magazine until 1983, and her intimate photographs of celebrities helped define the Rolling Stone look.

While working for Rolling Stone, Leibovitz learned that she could work for magazines and still create personal work of her family, which for her was the most important: "You don't get the opportunity to do this kind of intimate work except with the people you love, the people who will put up with you. They're the people who open their hearts and souls and lives to you. You must take care of them."

==== The Rolling Stones ====
Leibovitz photographed the Rolling Stones in San Francisco in 1971 and 1972, and served as the concert-tour photographer for the Rolling Stones' Tour of the Americas '75. Her favorite photo from the tour was a photo of Mick Jagger in an elevator. The mid-1970s brought Leibovitz an increasing amount of notoriety and its concomitant tribulations. In 1975, the Rolling Stones invited Leibovitz to document their six-month concert tour. Living in the world of her subjects, her camera did not shield Leibovitz from the rock 'n' roll life-style. She began using cocaine on tour and struggled for years afterward to recover.

==== John Lennon ====
Leibovitz's portrait of John Lennon and Yoko Ono a few hours before Lennon's murder

On December 8, 1980, Leibovitz had a photo shoot with John Lennon for Rolling Stone, and she promised him he would make the cover. She had initially tried to get a picture with just Lennon alone, as Rolling Stone wanted, but Lennon insisted that both he and Yoko Ono be on the cover. Leibovitz then tried to re-create something like the kissing scene from the couple's Double Fantasy album cover, a picture Leibovitz loved. She had Lennon remove his clothes and curl up next to Ono on the floor. Leibovitz recalls,

What is interesting is she said she'd take her top off and I said, "Leave everything on"—‌not really preconceiving the picture at all. Then he curled up next to her and it was very, very strong. You couldn't help but feel that he was cold and he looked like he was clinging on to her. I think it was amazing to look at the first Polaroid and they were both very excited. John said, "You've captured our relationship exactly. Promise me it'll be on the cover." I looked him in the eye and we shook on it.

Leibovitz was the last person to professionally photograph Lennon‍—‌he was shot and killed five hours later. About a month later, Rolling Stone gave grieving music fans his "last image".

The photograph was subsequently re-created in 2009 by the couple's son Sean Lennon posing with his girlfriend Charlotte Kemp Muhl, with male/female roles reversed (Lennon clothed, Kemp naked), and by Henry Bond and Sam Taylor-Wood in their YBA pastiche on October 26, 1993.

=== 1980–2000 ===
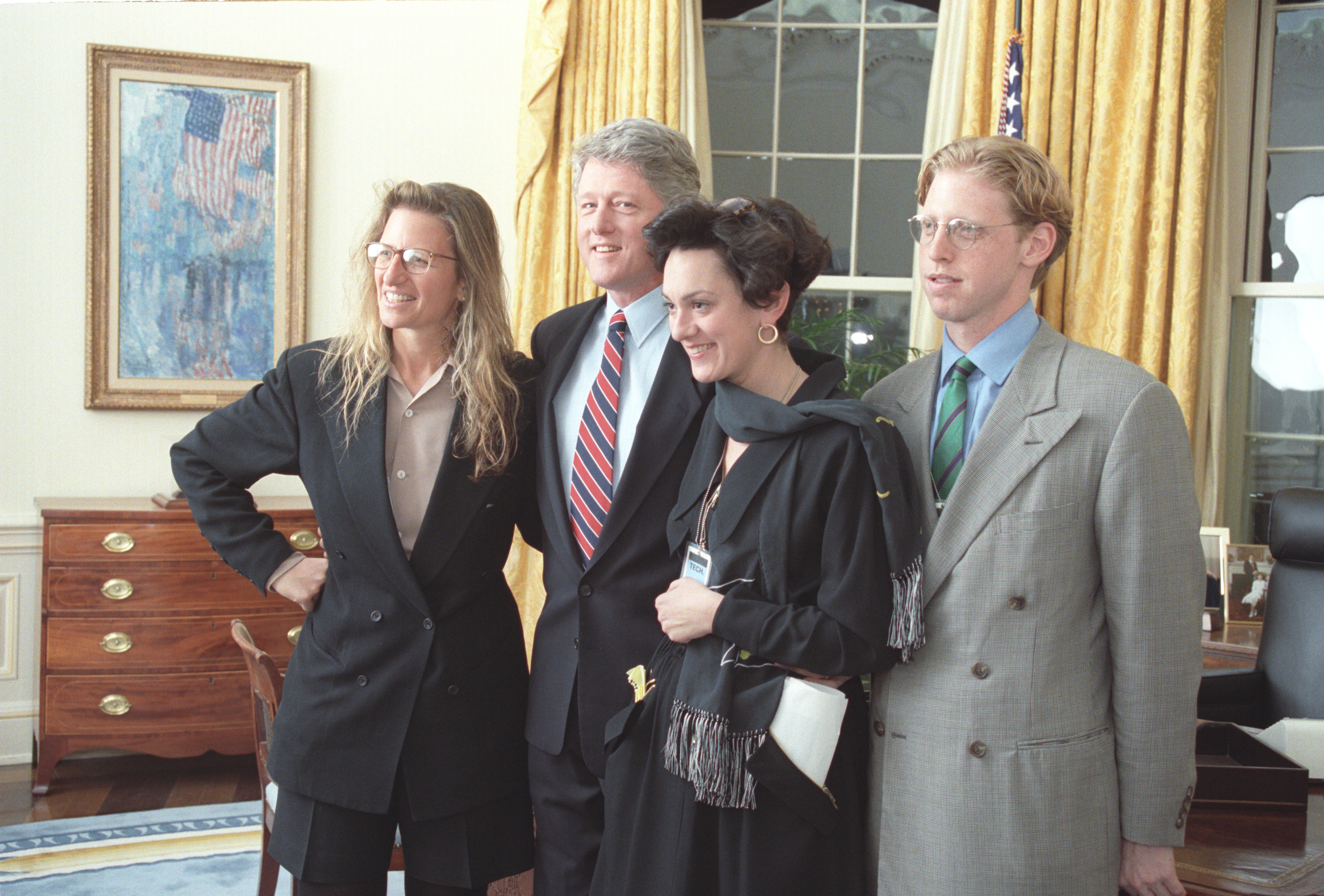
Leibovitz with Bill Clinton, January 1993

Leibovitz's new style of lighting and use of bold colors and poses got her a position with Vanity Fair magazine in 1983.

Leibovitz photographed celebrities for an international advertising campaign for American Express charge cards, which won a Clio award in 1987.

In 1991, Leibovitz mounted an exhibition at the National Portrait Gallery. She was the second living portraitist and first woman to show there. That same year, Leibovitz was also made Commandeur de l'Ordre des Arts et des Lettres by the French government. Also in 1991, Leibovitz emulated Margaret Bourke-White's feat by mounting one of the eagle gargoyles on the 61st floor of the Chrysler Building in Manhattan, where she photographed the dancer David Parsons cavorting on another eagle gargoyle. Noted Life photographer and picture editor John Loengard made a gripping photo of Leibovitz at the climax of her danger (Loengard was photographing Leibovitz for The New York Times that day).

In 1994, Leibovitz photographed Carl Lewis for Pirelli's famous Power Is Nothing Without Control ad campaign. The most well-known advertisement featured Lewis crouched in a sprinting position sporting bright red stilettos.

In 1998, Leibovitz began to work regularly for Vogue.

=== 2000–present ===
==== Brooklyn Museum retrospective ====
In 2007, a major retrospective of Leibovitz's work was held at the Brooklyn Museum. The retrospective was based on her book, Annie Leibovitz: A Photographer's Life, 1990–2005 and included many of her professional (celebrity) photographs and numerous personal photographs of her family, children, and partner Susan Sontag. This show, which was expanded to include three official portraits of Queen Elizabeth II, then went on the road for seven stops. It was on display at the Corcoran Gallery of Art in Washington, D.C., from October 2007 to January 2008 and at the Palace of the Legion of Honor in San Francisco from March 2008 to May 2008. In February 2009, the exhibition was moved to Berlin, Germany. The show included 200 photographs. This exhibition and her talk focused on her personal photographs and life.

==== Other work ====
- In 2007, The Walt Disney Company hired her to do a series of photographs with celebrities in various roles and scenes for the Walt Disney Parks and Resorts "Year of a Million Dreams" campaign.
- In 2010, Fotografiska Stockholm opened with inaugural exhibitions that included Annie Leibovitz's "A Photographer's Life, 1990 to 2005."
- In 2011, Leibovitz was nominated alongside Singaporean photographer Dominic Khoo and Wing Shya for Asia Pacific Photographer of the Year.
- In October 2011, Leibovitz had an exhibit in Moscow. In an interview with Rossiya 24, she explained her photography style.
- In 2014, Leibovtiz did a shoot of Kim Kardashian, Kanye West, and their daughter North West for an article in Vanity Fair.
- In the same year, the New-York Historical Society mounted an exhibit of Leibovitz's work, based on her 2011 book, Pilgrimages.
- From January 2016 to February 2017, WOMEN: New Portraits, commissioned by UBS and reflecting the changing roles of women, was shown in 10 cities worldwide.
- In 2017, Leibovitz announced the release of an online photography class entitled "Annie Leibovitz Teaches Photography".
- In January 2018, Leibovitz's cover photo for Vanity Fair was criticized online for image manipulation that appeared to show actress Reese Witherspoon with three legs.
- February–April 2019: "Annie Leibovitz. The Early Years, 1970–1983: Archive Project No. 1" at Hauser & Wirth Gallery, Los Angeles
- In 2025, Leibovitz produced several portraits for the television series The Chosen.

==== Pirelli calendar ====
In 2015, Leibovitz was the principal photographer for the 2016 Pirelli calendar. Leibovitz took a drastic shift from the calendar traditional style by focusing on admirable women as opposed to sexuality. The calendar included Amy Schumer, Serena Williams, and Patti Smith. Leibovitz had previously worked on the 2000 calendar.

==== IKEA ====
In 2023, Leibovitz was commissioned by IKEA to "create a series of 25 portraits that illuminate the nuances of 'life at home'."

==== Crystal Bridges: Annie Leibovitz at Work ====
Running from September 16, 2023, to January 29, 2024, the Crystal Bridges Museum of American Art hosted "Annie Leibovitz at Work", an exhibition of more than 300 images encompassing more than 50 years of Leibovitz's career. Vogue magazine called the show "a sweeping retrospective of 300 photographs taken by Leibovitz throughout her illustrious career. The works on display range from celebrity portraiture to images from the pages of Vogue and Vanity Fair to indelible moments in history like the Apollo 17 launch and Watergate. In one room, a table piled high with photo books is paired with a set of cheeky Polaroid snaps of policemen who have ticketed Leibovitz over the years for driving too fast in her '63 Porsche on California's Highway 5. With the prints pinned up on the first two sections of gallery walls in a strikingly relaxed format, the show feels akin to a tour of her studio."

=== Controversies ===
==== Queen Elizabeth II photoshoot ====
In 2007, the BBC misrepresented Leibovitz's portrait shooting of Queen Elizabeth II to take the Queen's official picture for her state visit to Virginia. This was filmed for the BBC documentary A Year with the Queen. A promotional trailer for the film showed the Queen reacting incredulously to Leibovitz's suggestion ("less dressy") that she remove her tiara, stating "less dressy? What do you think this is?" This cut immediately to a scene of the Queen walking down a corridor, telling an aide "I'm not changing anything. I've had enough dressing like this, thank you very much." The BBC later apologized and admitted that the sequence of events had been misrepresented, as the Queen was in fact walking to the sitting in the second scene, not storming off from it like the BBC implied by presenting the scenes in that order. This led to a BBC scandal and a shake-up of ethics training. However, a 2015 article in The Times contradicts this story. It stated that the Queen was both incredulous at being asked to remove her crown as "no-one tells her what to do" and insulted, as the item was only a tiara.

==== LeBron James / King Kong photoshoot ====
In 2008, Leibovitz choreographed a photoshoot featuring LeBron James and Gisele Bündchen that appeared on the cover of Vogue. The cover was the first time a black man appeared on Vogue. The cover drew controversy due to its depiction of James posing with his hand around Bündchen's waist, similar to that of a poster of King Kong holding onto Fay Wray. People including Jemele Hill said the gorilla-like pose played on racial stereotypes. Magazine analyst Samir Husni believed the photo to be deliberately provocative, adding on Today, "So when you have a cover that reminds people of King Kong and brings those stereotypes to the front, black man wanting white woman, it's not innocent". The Fashion Post magazine ranked it the third-most controversial Vogue magazine cover.

==== Miley Cyrus photoshoot ====
On April 25, 2008, Entertainment Tonight reported that 15-year-old Miley Cyrus had posed topless for a photo shoot with Vanity Fair. The photograph and subsequently released behind-the-scenes photographs show Cyrus topless, her bare back exposed but her front covered with a bedsheet. The photo was taken by Leibovitz. The full photograph was published with an accompanying story on The New York Times' website on April 27, 2008. On April 29, 2008, The New York Times clarified: though the pictures left an impression that she was bare-breasted, Cyrus was wrapped in a bedsheet and was actually not topless. Some parents expressed outrage at the nature of the photograph, which a Disney spokesperson described as "a situation [that] was created to deliberately manipulate a 15-year-old in order to sell magazines". In response to the Internet circulation of the photo and ensuing media attention, Cyrus released a statement of apology on April 27: "I took part in a photo shoot that was supposed to be 'artistic' and now, seeing the photographs and reading the story, I feel so embarrassed. I never intended for any of this to happen and I apologize to my fans who I care so deeply about." Leibovitz also released a statement saying: "I'm sorry that my portrait of Miley has been misinterpreted.... The photograph is a simple, classic portrait, shot with very little makeup, and I think it is very beautiful."

== Personal life ==
=== Children ===
Leibovitz has three daughters. She gave birth to her first, Sarah Cameron Leibovitz, in October 2001 when Leibovitz was 52 years old. Twin girls Susan and Samuelle were born by a surrogate in May 2005.

=== Relationships ===
Leibovitz had a close relationship with writer and essayist Susan Sontag from 1989 until Sontag's death in 2004. During Sontag's lifetime, neither woman publicly disclosed whether the relationship was a platonic friendship or romantic. In 2006, Newsweek magazine made reference to Leibovitz's decade-plus relationship with Sontag, stating, "The two first met in the late '80s, when Leibovitz photographed her for a book jacket. They never lived together, though they each had an apartment within view of the other's." When Leibovitz was interviewed for her autobiography A Photographer's Life: 1990–2005, she said that the book told a number of stories, and "with Susan, it was a love story." While The New York Times in 2009 referred to Sontag as Leibovitz's "companion", Leibovitz wrote in A Photographer's Life: "words like 'companion' and 'partner' were not in our vocabulary. We were two people who helped each other through our lives. The closest word is still 'friend'." That same year, Leibovitz said the descriptor "lover" was accurate. She later reiterated: "Call us 'lovers'. I like 'lovers.' You know, 'lovers' sounds romantic. I mean, I want to be perfectly clear. I love Susan."

=== Religion ===
When asked if being Jewish is important to her, Leibovitz replied, "I'm not a practicing Jew, but I feel very Jewish." In 2024, she stated she goes to the Central Synagogue in Manhattan, New York. Her daughters' bat mitzvahs were hosted at the Synagogue.

=== Financial troubles ===
In February 2009, Leibovitz borrowed US$15.5 million, after having experienced financial challenges, putting up several houses as well as the rights to all of her photographs as collateral. The New York Times noted that "one of the world's most successful photographers essentially pawned every snap of the shutter she had made or will make until the loans are paid off", and that, despite a US$50 million archive, Leibovitz had a "long history of less than careful financial dealings" and "a recent series of personal issues" including the loss of her parents and the 2004 death of Sontag, as well as the addition of two children to her family, and controversial renovation of three Greenwich Village properties.

The Greenwich Village properties, at 755–757 Greenwich Street, are part of the Greenwich Village Historic District, and thus the New York City Landmarks Preservation Commission must review and approve any work done to the buildings. However, work initiated on the buildings in October 2002, without a permit, began a chain of destruction of those buildings and the neighbor's at 311 W 11th Street. Due to pressure from the Greenwich Village Society for Historic Preservation and other groups, the buildings were finally stabilized, though the preservation group criticized the eventual repairs as shoddy and historically insensitive.

In July 2009, the Art Capital Group filed a breach of contract lawsuit against Leibovitz for US$24 million regarding repayment of these loans. In a follow-up article from September 5, 2009, an Associated Press story quoted legal experts as saying that filing for bankruptcy reorganization might offer Leibovitz her best chance to control and direct the disposition of her assets to satisfy debts. On September 11, Art Capital Group withdrew its lawsuit against Leibovitz and extended the due date for repayment of the US$24 million loan. Under the agreement, Leibovitz retains control over her work and will be the "exclusive agent in the sale of her real property (land) and copyrights".

In March 2010, Colony Capital concluded a new financing and marketing agreement with Leibovitz, paying off Art Capital and removing or reducing the risks to Leibovitz of losing her artistic works and real estate. The following month, Brunswick Capital Partners sued Leibovitz, claiming it was owed several hundred thousand dollars for helping her restructure her debt. In December 2012, Leibovitz listed her West Village townhouse for sale at $33 million, stating she wanted to move closer to her daughter.

== Notable photographs ==
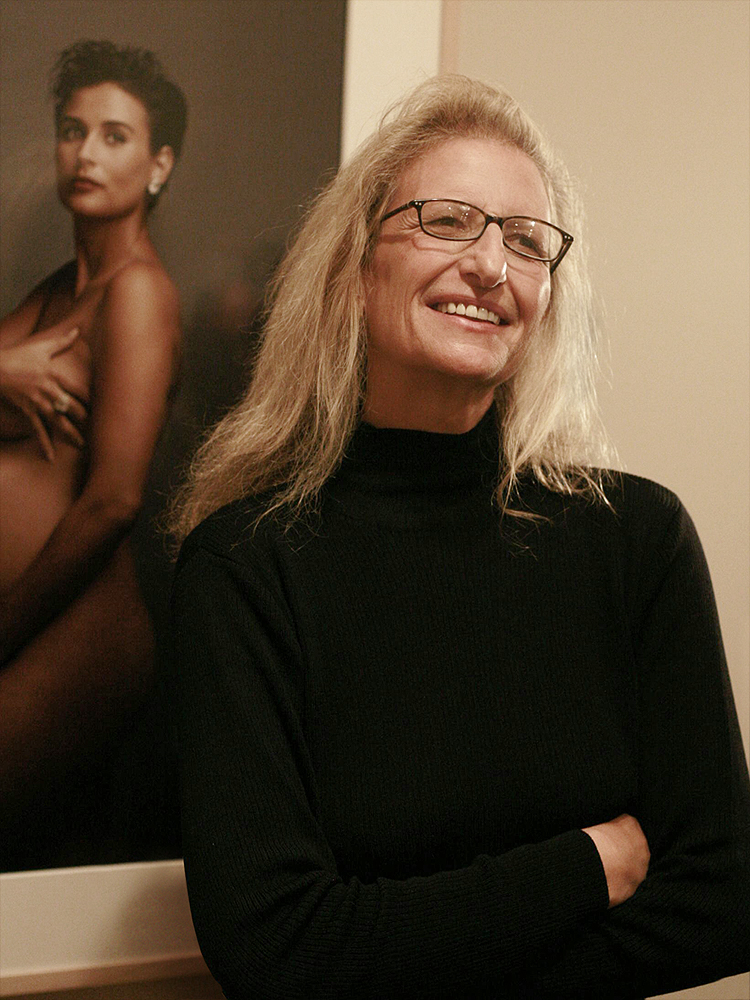
Leibovitz in front of her More Demi Moore Vanity Fair cover photo, 2008

- In 1978, Leibovitz photographed the cover for Joan Armatrading's fifth studio album To the Limit, spending four days at her house capturing the images. Leibovitz also did the photography for Armatrading's live album, Steppin' Out.
- In 1980, Leibovitz photographed Ann & Nancy Wilson of Heart for the May 15, 1980 cover of Rolling Stone magazine on the beach in Biloxi, Mississippi. It happened while the band were on tour to promote the album Bébé le Strange. According to the sisters autobiography Kicking & Dreaming: A Story of Heart, Soul, and Rock and Roll, Leibovitz wanted to photographed the sisters in the nude. Nancy stayed covered up, while Ann was coaxed to pose topless, but went on, and later regretted it by trusting Leibovitz, because she was a female photographer. The sisters were not happy with the results of the photos. They wanted Leibovitz to destroy the photo negatives, but she refused to. They took her to court and filed a lawsuit against her. The judge ordered that the photo negatives be placed in a rotting safe deposit box, while the key was given to Leibovitz and Wilson. So the photos will not see the light of day.
- Sonia Braga was photographed for an American Express campaign in 1991.
- John Lennon and Yoko Ono for the January 22, 1981, Rolling Stone cover, taken the day Lennon was murdered. Leibovitz called it "the photograph of my life" and the photograph she would be remembered for.
- Linda Ronstadt in a red slip, on her bed, reaching for a glass of water in a 1976 cover story for Rolling Stone magazine.
- Demi Moore has been the subject of two highly publicized Vanity Fair covers taken by Leibovitz: More Demi Moore (Aug. 1991) featuring Moore pregnant and nude, and Demi's Birthday Suit (Aug 1992), showing Moore nude with a suit painted on her body.
- Marion Cotillard for the Autumn/Winter 2009 collection of the Lady Dior - Lady Rouge handbag campaign and for the November 2009 cover of Vogue with the cast of Nine.
- Fleetwood Mac for a 1977 issue of Rolling Stone magazine. Stevie Nicks and Mick Fleetwood are shown lying together, as are Christine McVie and Lindsey Buckingham at the opposite end of the bed. John McVie is shown reading Playboy magazine.
- Christo, fully wrapped so the viewer must take the artist's word that Christo is actually under the wrapping.
- Dolly Parton vamping for the camera while Arnold Schwarzenegger flexes his biceps behind her, featured in an August 25, 1977, Rolling Stone photo spread.
- Dan Aykroyd and John Belushi as The Blues Brothers, with their faces painted blue.
- Keira Knightley and Scarlett Johansson, both nude, with a fully clothed Tom Ford, for the cover of Vanity Fair's March 2006 Hollywood Issue.
- Knut with Leonardo DiCaprio, a 2007 Vanity Fair cover.
- Queen Elizabeth II on occasion of her state visit in United States in 2007, and in 2016 at Windsor Castle to mark her 90th birthday.
- Sting, naked in the desert, covered in mud to blend in with the scenery.
- Closeup portrait of Pete Townshend framed by his bleeding hand dripping real blood down the side of his face.
- "Fire" portrait and caption "Patti Smith Catches Fire."
- Cyndi Lauper, She's So Unusual (1983) and True Colors (1986) album covers.
- Bruce Springsteen, Born in the U.S.A. and Tunnel of Love album covers.
- Gisele Bündchen and LeBron James on the April 2008 cover of Vogue America.
- Family of Barack Obama in the White House.
- Lance Armstrong riding his bicycle in the buff in the rain. It was shown in Vanity Fair's 1999 December issue.
- Benedict Cumberbatch for Vogue in 2013.
- Kim Kardashian, Kanye West and their daughter North for Vogue in 2014.
- The cast of Star Wars: The Force Awakens for Vanity Fair in 2015 and the cast of Star Wars: The Last Jedi for Vanity Fair in 2017.
- Caitlyn Jenner for Vanity Fair in 2015.
- Mark Zuckerberg and his pregnant wife Priscilla Chan in 2015.
- Ariana Grande for Vogue in 2019.
- Christopher Hitchens at dinner on the night of his marriage to Carol Blue. Used on the cover of Hitchens' 1993 book For the Sake of Argument.
- Serena Williams on the cover of Vanity Fair August 2017, while pregnant.
- Ukraine's First Lady Olena Zelenska and President Volodymyr Zelenskyy for Vogue during the 2022 Russian invasion of Ukraine.
- Felipe VI of Spain and Queen Letizia for the Bank of Spain.
- Gavin Newsom for Vogue in 2026.

== Awards ==
- 1999: ADC Hall of Fame
- 2003: The Lucie Awards
- 2009: The Royal Photographic Society's Centenary Medal and Honorary Fellowship (HonFRPS) in recognition of a sustained, significant contribution to the art of photography
- 2013: Prince of Asturias Award for Communication
- 2015: Paez Medal of Art from VAEA
- 2016: International Photography Hall of Fame and Museum
- 2018: Honorary Doctorate of Fine Arts, Rhode Island School of Design

== Bibliography ==
- Leibovitz, Annie (1983). Annie Leibovitz: Photographs, Pantheon/Rolling Stone Press. ISBN 978-0394532080
- Leibovitz, Annie (1991). Annie Leibovitz: Photographs, 1970-1990. HarperCollins, New York. ISBN 978-0060166083, 0060166088
- Leibovitz, Annie (1992). Dancers. Smithsonian Press. ISBN 978-1560982081
- Leibovitz, Annie (1991). The White Oak Dance Project: 1990-1991 American Tour. Baryshnikov Productions.
- Leibovitz, Annie (1996). Olympic Portraits, Bulfinch Press / Little, Brown and Company
- Leibovitz, Annie; Adichie, Chimamanda Ngozi; Sontag, Susan; Steinem, Gloria (2000). Women. Random House. ISBN 978-0375756467
- Leibovitz, Annie (2003). American Music. Random House. ISBN 978-0224072717, 978-0375505072
- Leibovitz, Annie (2006). A Photographer's Life 1990–2005. (Accompanied her exhibition that debuted at the Brooklyn Museum in October 2006.) ISBN 081297963X
- Leibovitz, Annie (2008). Annie Leibovitz at Work. Random House. ISBN 978-1838668204
- Leibovitz, Annie; Goodwin, Doris Kearns (2011). Pilgrimage. Random House. ISBN 978-0375505089
- Leibovitz, Annie; Carter, Graydon; Martin, Steve; Obrist, Hans Ulrich; Roth, Paul (2022). Annie Leibovitz SUMO. Taschen. ISBN 978-3836582186
- Leibovitz, Annie; Fuller, Alexandra (2017). Annie Leibovitz: Portraits 2005–2016. Phaidon Press ISBN 978-0714875132
- Leibovitz, Annie; Wintour, Anna (2021). Wonderland. Phaidon Press. ISBN 978-1838661526

=== Exhibition catalogs ===
- Leibovitz, Annie, Raatikainen, Riita (Ed.) (1999). Annie Leibovitz. Helsinki City Art Museum. ISBN 9789518965407

== See also ==
- Leibovitz v. Paramount Pictures Corp.
- LGBT culture in New York City
- List of LGBT people from New York City
- NYC Pride March
