= List of Sports Illustrated Swimsuit Issue models =

This is a list of models who have appeared in the annual Sports Illustrated Swimsuit Issue.

== A ==
- Nina Agdal
- Adaora Akubilo
- Lily Aldridge
- Karen Alexander
- Kim Alexis
- Carol Alt
- Michelle Alves
- May Andersen
- Anitta
- Alex Aust
- Katie Austin

== B ==
- Melissa Baker
- Bianca Balti
- Tyra Banks
- Natasha Barnard
- Ana Beatriz Barros
- Michaela Bercu
- Kylie Bax
- Jamee Becker
- Michelle Behennah
- Monica Bellucci
- Elsa Benítez
- Rose Bertram
- Simone Biles
- Sue Bird
- Kate Bock
- Caprice Bourret
- Cameron Brink
- Christie Brinkley
- Olivia Brower

== C ==
- Carla Campbell
- Naomi Campbell
- Chase Carter
- Nina Cash
- Laetitia Casta
- Haley Cavinder
- Jordan Chiles
- Jeisa Chiminazzo
- Ciara
- Hailey Clauson
- Kim Cloutier
- Napheesa Collier
- Te'a Cooper
- Natalie Coughlin
- Cindy Crawford
- Kamie Crawford
- Olivia Culpo
- Ehrinn Cummings
- Sophie Cunningham

== D ==
- Myla Dalbesio
- Sonia Dara
- Hannah Davis
- Anne de Paula
- Jenna de Rosnay
- Brooklyn Decker
- Yamila Diaz
- Cintia Dicker
- Skylar Diggins
- Lucia Dvorská
- Emily DiDonato
- Hilary Duff
- Crystal Dunn
- Olivia Dunne
- Lorena Durán

== E ==
- Alix Earle
- Selita Ebanks
- Angie Everhart
- Kelly Emberg

== F ==
- Hannah Ferguson
- Luján Fernández
- Calle Fetzer
- Jennie Finch
- Isabeli Fontana
- Louise Forsling
- Kenza Fourati
- Megan Fox
- Azzi Fudd

== G ==
- Yasmeen Ghauri
- Esti Ginzburg
- Kim Glass
- Jessica Gomes
- Ekaterina Gordeeva
- Izabel Goulart
- Ashley Graham
- Erin Gray
- Eileen Gu

== H ==
- Tiffany Haddish
- Gigi Hadid
- Ella Halikas
- Alicia Hall
- Anna Hall
- Bridget Hall
- Melissa Haro
- Jessica Hart
- Lori Harvey
- Erin Heatherton
- Bregje Heinen
- Julie Henderson
- Danielle Herrington
- Eva Herzigová
- Kristy Hinze
- Samantha Hoopes
- Marloes Horst
- Brenna Huckaby
- Rachel Hunter

== I ==
- Chanel Iman
- Kathy Ireland

== J ==
- Kate James
- Melissa Jefferson-Wooden
- Maria João
- Olivia Jordan

== K ==
- Haley Kalil
- Mia Kang
- Kim Kardashian
- Amanda Kay
- Melissa Keller
- Cindy Kimberly
- Gayle King
- Vendela Kirsebom
- Heidi Klum
- Beyoncé Knowles
- Nelly Korda
- Camille Kostek

== L ==
- Padma Lakshmi
- Robyn Lawley
- Shakara Ledard
- Suni Lee
- Estelle Lefebure
- Kim Lemanton
- Noémie Lenoir
- Damaris Lewis
- Angela Lindvall
- Roberta Little
- Kathy Loghry
- Michelle Lombardo
- Vanessa Lorenzo
- Tara Lynn

== M ==
- Ilona Maher
- Brittany Mahomes
- Shirley Mallmann
- Simone Manuel
- Josie Maran
- Babette March
- Jarah Mariano
- Natalie Mariduena
- Caroline Marks
- Juliana Martins
- Judit Mascó
- Alexa Massari
- Valeria Mazza
- Turia Mau
- Hunter McGrady
- Elle Macpherson
- Lauren Mellor
- Ariel Meredith
- Kelsey Merritt
- Alyssa Miller
- Marisa Miller
- Barbara Minty
- Coco Mitchell
- Jolie Mitnick Salter
- Tanya Mityushina
- Alex Morgan
- Solveig Mørk Hansen
- Genevieve Morton
- Fernanda Motta
- Karen Mulder
- Jessie Murph
- Carolyn Murphy
- Maye Musk

== N ==
- Brooks Nader
- Aline Nakashima
- Petra Nemcova
- Navia Nguyen
- Chandra North
- Yumi Nu

== O ==
- Lana Ogilvie
- Nneka Ogwumike
- Raica Oliveira
- Oluchi Onweagba
- Julie Ordon
- Naomi Osaka
- Carré Otis

== P ==
- Barbara Palvin
- Irina Pantaeva
- Danica Patrick
- Jessica Perez
- Daniela Pestova
- Ann Peterson
- Kim Petras
- Olivia Ponton
- Paulina Porizkova
- Tori Praver

== Q ==
- Audrey Quock

== R ==
- Aly Raisman
- Megan Rapinoe
- Emily Ratajkowski
- Frankie Rayder
- Gabrielle Reece
- Angel Reese
- Bar Refaeli
- Alexis Ren
- Crystal Renn
- Sofia Resing
- Hilary Rhoda
- DiDi Richards
- Ashley Richardson
- Rachel Roberts
- Rebecca Romijn
- Kelly Rohrbach
- Pania Rose
- Ronda Rousey

== S ==
- Sara Sampaio
- Daniella Sarahyba
- Stephanie Seymour
- Ingrid Seynhaeve
- Maria Sharapova
- Irina Shayk
- Josephine Skriver
- Renée Simonsen
- Molly Sims
- Amber Smith
- Ashley Smith
- Kim Smith
- Mallory Snyder
- Tamara Spoelder
- Megan Thee Stallion
- Sloane Stephens
- Breanna Stewart
- Martha Stewart
- Yvette Sylvander
- Yvonne Sylvander

== T ==
- Fernanda Tavares
- Niki Taylor
- Chrissy Teigen
- Hannah Teter
- Gabby Thomas
- Duckie Thot
- Cheryl Tiegs
- Tinashe
- Yésica Toscanini
- Ali Truwit

== U ==
- Kate Upton
- Cris Urena

== V ==
- Valerie van der Graaf
- Jessica Van Der Steen
- Hailey Van Lith
- Apollonia van Ravenstein
- Paige VanZant
- Veronika Vařeková
- Michelle Vawer
- Patricia Velásquez
- Manon von Gerkan
- Lindsey Vonn
- Anne Vyalitsyna

== W ==
- Akure Wall
- Katherine Webb
- Amy Wesson
- Caroline Wozniacki
- Jessica White
- Summer Wilson
- Nicole Williams
- Roshumba Williams
- Serena Williams
- Stacey Williams
- Venus Williams
- Berkleigh Wright

== Y ==
- Kara Young
