= List of Sports Illustrated Swimsuit Issue cover models =

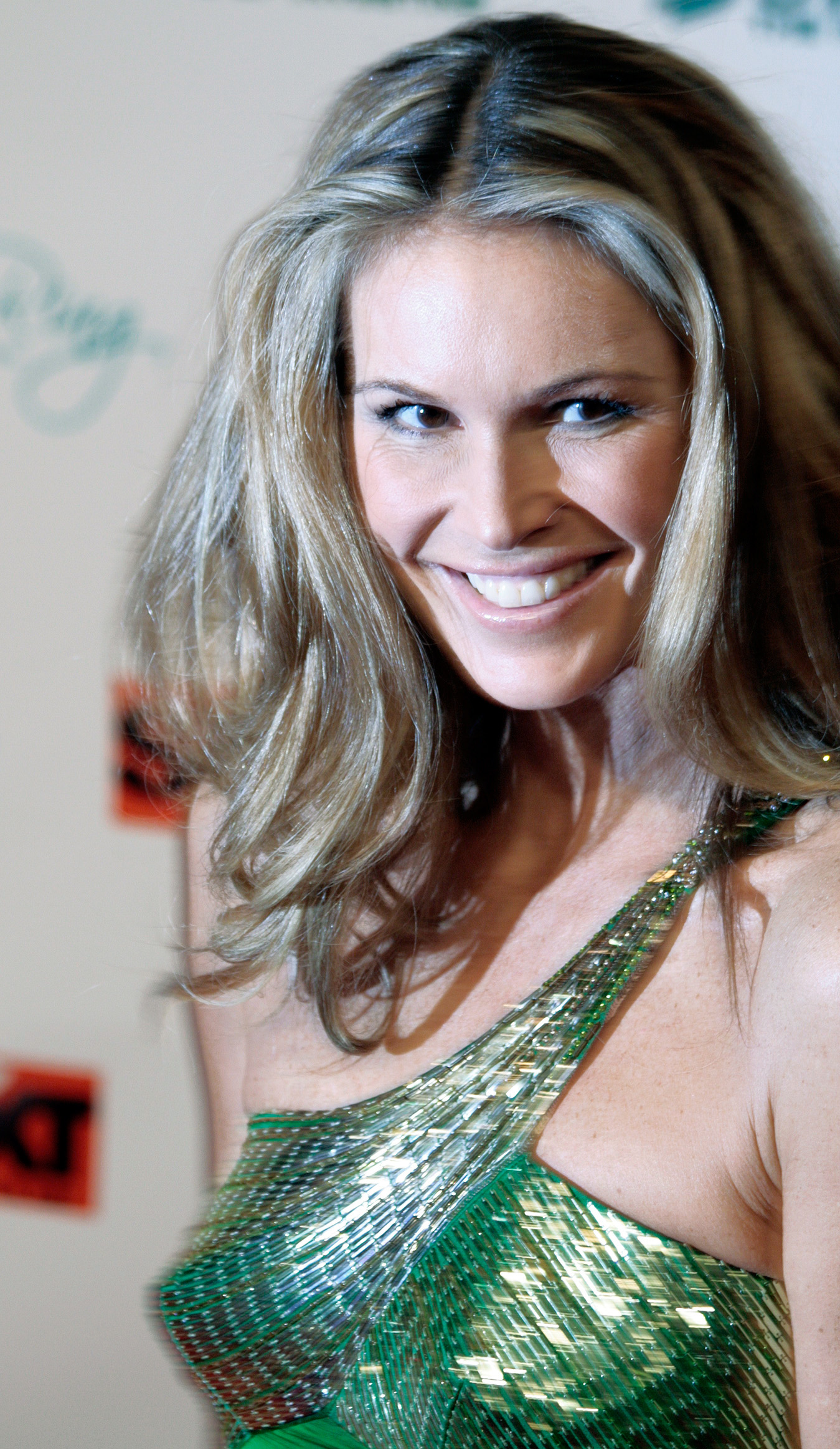
Elle Macpherson holds the record for most swimsuit issue covers, with five

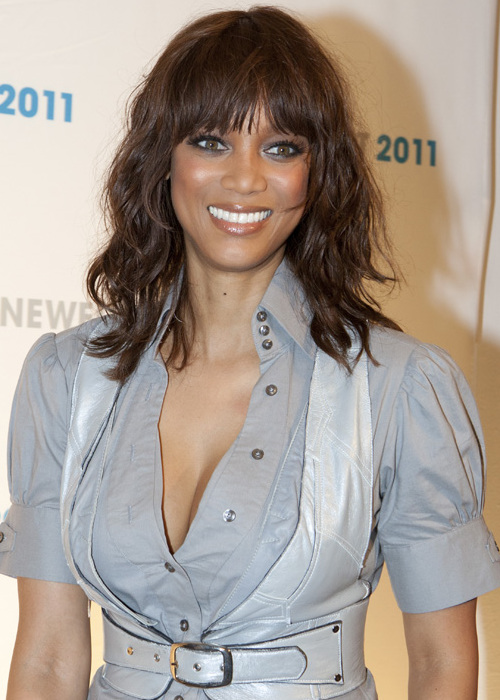
Tyra Banks was the first African American swimsuit issue cover model

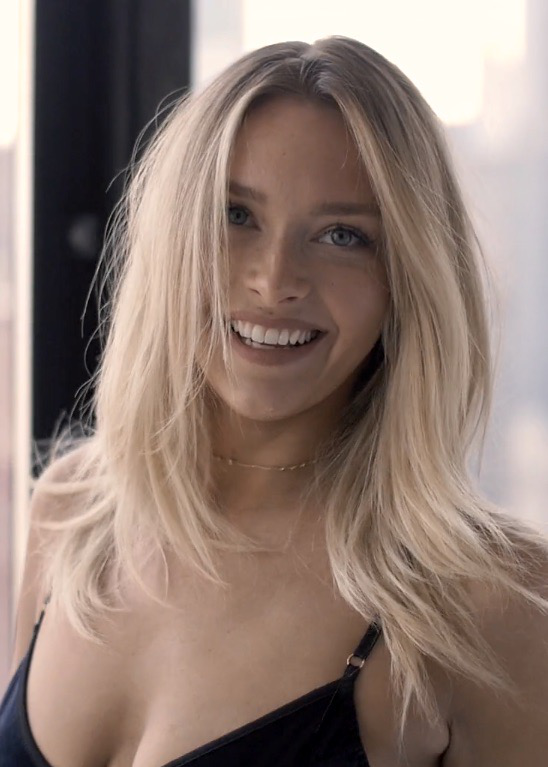
Camille Kostek landed a solo cover in 2019 after being scouted in the issue's first ever open casting call

This is the chronological history of cover models for the Sports Illustrated Swimsuit Issue. The Sports Illustrated Swimsuit Issue has grown from being an issue of Sports Illustrated magazine created to fill space at a time of year with little sports news into a major marketing franchise that includes a special separate issue, a website, television specials, calendars, books and enormous amounts of advertising. It began as a short photo spread of women in bathing suits and has become a fashion issue for beachwear worn by the world's top models. Being the subject of the Sports Illustrated magazine cover is a well chronicled event which has both become a measure by which fame is measured and a status which is supposedly accompanied by a curse known as the "SI jinx". There seems to have been no reports of any association of the SI jinx with the swimsuit issue.

There is much public interest in who is on the cover of fashion magazines with websites dedicated to the subject. For supermodels, being on the cover of prominent magazines, such as Sports Illustrated's annual swimsuit edition, is regarded as an accomplishment, especially if the model appears solo. The unveiling of the swimsuit issue cover and its model is a media event, widely reported in the press.

For some, the image of these models on the cover of a sports magazine is a moral issue. Each year, the issue generates numerous letters from readers both in support and in opposition of the issue. Numerous subscribers cancel subscriptions as a matter of propriety annually. Recently, Time Warner took action to avoid many of the complainants by withholding the Swimsuit issue from certain types of recipients, such as libraries and schools.

Numerous types of trivia and statistics are monitored regarding the swimsuit issue cover subjects. Several have gone on to subsequent success in Hollywood. Others have become the spouses of notable celebrities. The following list is a list of models chosen as subjects for the Sports Illustrated Swimsuit Issue cover, incorporating some related statistics and trivia.

== List of covers ==
Issue	Name (appearance)	Notes
January 20, 1964	Babette March	
January 18, 1965	Sue Peterson	
January 17, 1966	Sunny Bippus	
January 16, 1967	Marilyn Tindall	
January 15, 1968	Turia Mau	
January 13, 1969	Jamee Becker	
January 12, 1970	Cheryl Tiegs	
February 1, 1971	Tannia Rubiano	
January 17, 1972	Sheila Roscoe	
January 29, 1973	Dayle Haddon	
January 28, 1974	Ann Simonton	
January 27, 1975	Cheryl Tiegs (2)	first repeat cover model
January 19, 1976	Yvette Sylvander; Yvonne Sylvander	first multi-subject cover
January 24, 1977	Lena Kansbod	
January 16, 1978	Maria Joao	most cancellations (340), most letters regarding a cover (2947)
February 5, 1979	Christie Brinkley	
February 2, 1980	Christie Brinkley (2)	
February 9, 1981	Christie Brinkley (3)	first three-time cover model
February 8, 1982	Carol Alt	
February 14, 1983	Cheryl Tiegs (3)	
February 13, 1984	Paulina Porizkova	youngest Swimsuit Issue cover model at age 18
February 11, 1985	Paulina Porizkova (2)	
February 10, 1986	Elle Macpherson	
February 9, 1987	Elle Macpherson (2)	
February 15, 1988	Elle Macpherson (3)	
February 7, 1989	Kathy Ireland	Best selling swimsuit issue, 25th anniversary
February 12, 1990	Judit Mascó	
February 11, 1991	Ashley (Richardson) Montana	
March 9, 1992	Kathy Ireland (2)	
February 22, 1993	Vendela Kirsebom	
February 14, 1994	Kathy Ireland (3); Elle Macpherson (4); Rachel Hunter	pregnant cover models (Ireland & Hunter), first four-time cover model (Macpherson)
February 20, 1995	Daniela Peštová	
January 29, 1996	Valeria Mazza; Tyra Banks	first African-American cover model
February 21, 1997	Tyra Banks (2)	first dedicated special issue, first African-American solo cover model.
February 20, 1998	Heidi Klum	
February 12, 1999	Rebecca Romijn	
February 1, 2000	Daniela Peštová (2)	
February 1, 2001	Elsa Benítez	
February 1, 2002	Yamila Diaz-Rahi	
February 18, 2003	Petra Němcová	
February 10, 2004	Veronika Vařeková inset Anna Kournikova	40th anniversary
February 15, 2005	Carolyn Murphy inset Jessica White, Marisa Miller, Yamila Diaz-Rahi	
February 17, 2006	Veronika Vařeková (2); Elle Macpherson (5); Rebecca Romijn (2); Rachel Hunter (2); Daniela Peštová (3); Elsa Benítez (2); Carolyn Murphy (2); Yamila Diaz-Rahi (2) inset Heidi Klum, Maria Sharapova	record 5th cover for Macpherson
February 15, 2007	Beyoncé Knowles inset Bar Refaeli	First non-model and non-athlete
February 12, 2008	Marisa Miller	
February 10, 2009	Bar Refaeli inset Brooklyn Decker	
February 12, 2010	Brooklyn Decker	
February 15, 2011	Irina Shayk inset Kate Upton	
February 14, 2012	Kate Upton inset Alex Morgan	
February 13, 2013	Kate Upton (2) inset Hannah Davis	
February 18, 2014	Nina Agdal; Lily Aldridge; Chrissy Teigen (1) flip-cover Kate Upton	50th Anniversary
February 20, 2015	Hannah Davis	
February 23, 2016	Ronda Rousey; Ashley Graham; Hailey Clauson	First issue with multiple front covers
February 20, 2017	Kate Upton (3)	First cover model with multiple front covers
February 18, 2018	Danielle Herrington	
May 13, 2019	Tyra Banks (3); Camille Kostek; Alex Morgan	
July 13, 2020	Kate Bock; Jasmine Sanders; Olivia Culpo	
July 19, 2021	Megan Thee Stallion; Naomi Osaka; Leyna Bloom	Stallion is the first rapper cover. 2nd non-athlete or model to cover. Osaka is the first tennis player to cover, and first person of Asian descent to cover. Bloom is the first trans model to cover.
May 19, 2022	Kim Kardashian; Ciara; Maye Musk; Yumi Nu	Musk was the oldest model to ever appear on the cover until 2023.
May 19, 2023	Martha Stewart; Kim Petras; Megan Fox; Brooks Nader	Stewart became the oldest model to ever appear on the cover. Petras is the second openly trans woman to appear on the cover.
May 17, 2024	Kate Upton (4); Chrissy Teigen (2); Gayle King; Hunter McGrady; Legends	60th Anniversary. Sports Illustrated Swimsuit 2024 - Celebrating 60 years of Influence.
May 13, 2025	Salma Hayek Pinault; Olivia Dunne; Lauren Chan; Jordan Chiles	
May 26, 2026	Hilary Duff; Alix Earle; Tiffany Haddish; Nicole Williams English	

== Models on multiple covers ==
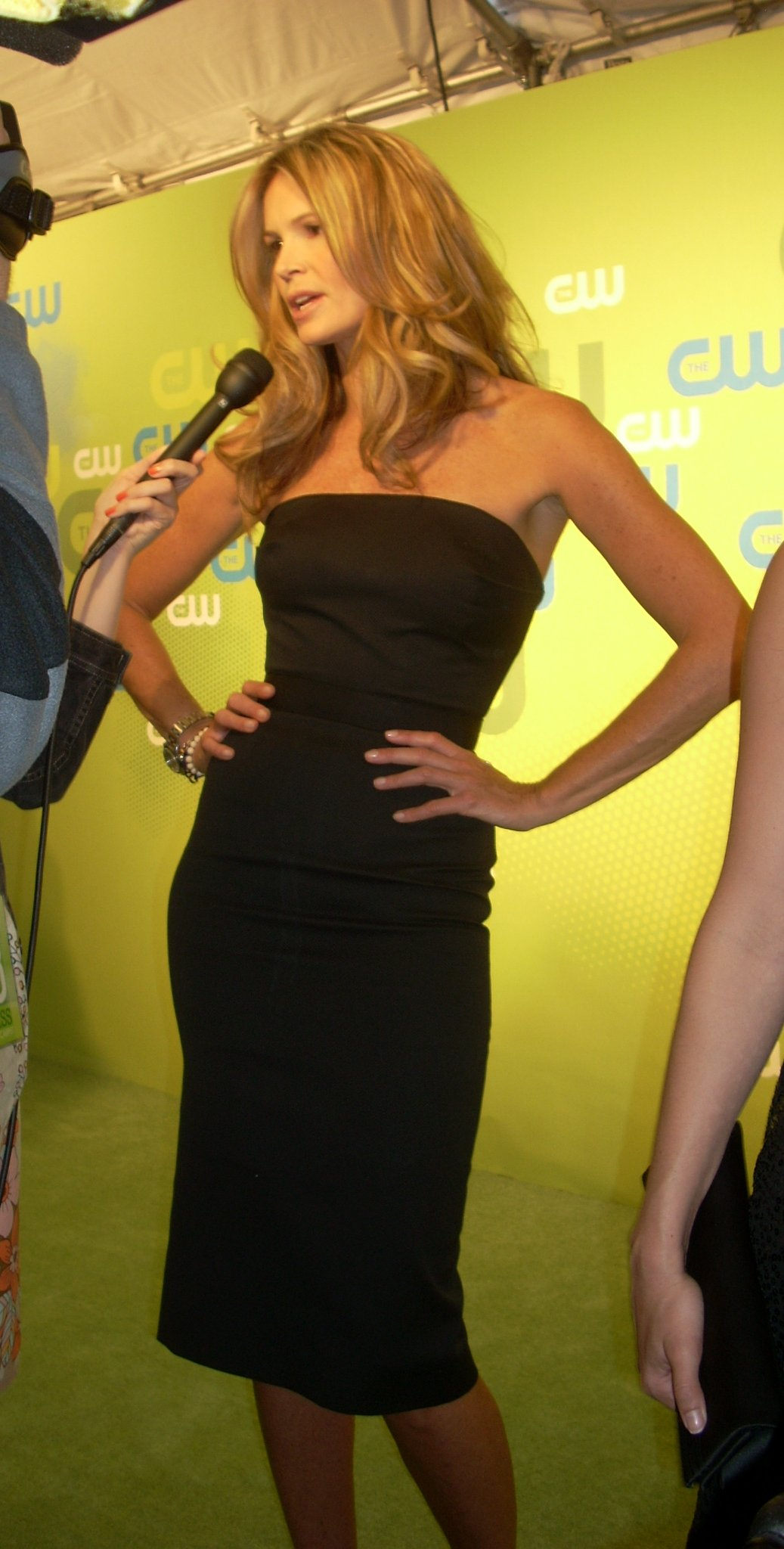
Elle Macpherson has the most covers in the issue's history with five

Most covers by model
Model	Number of covers	Issues
Elle Macpherson	5	1986, 1987, 1988, 1994, 2006
Kate Upton	4	2012, 2013, 2017, 2024
Christie Brinkley	3	1979, 1980, 1981
Cheryl Tiegs	3	1970, 1975, 1983
Kathy Ireland	3	1989, 1992, 1994
Daniela Pestova	3	1995, 2000, 2006
Tyra Banks	3	1996, 1997, 2019
Paulina Porizkova	2	1984, 1985
Rachel Hunter	2	1994, 2006
Rebecca Romijn	2	1999, 2006
Elsa Benítez	2	2001, 2006
Yamila Diaz-Rahi	2	2002, 2006
Veronica Varekova	2	2004, 2006
Carolyn Murphy	2	2005, 2006
Chrissy Teigen	2	2014, 2024
