= Sports Illustrated Swimsuit Model Search =

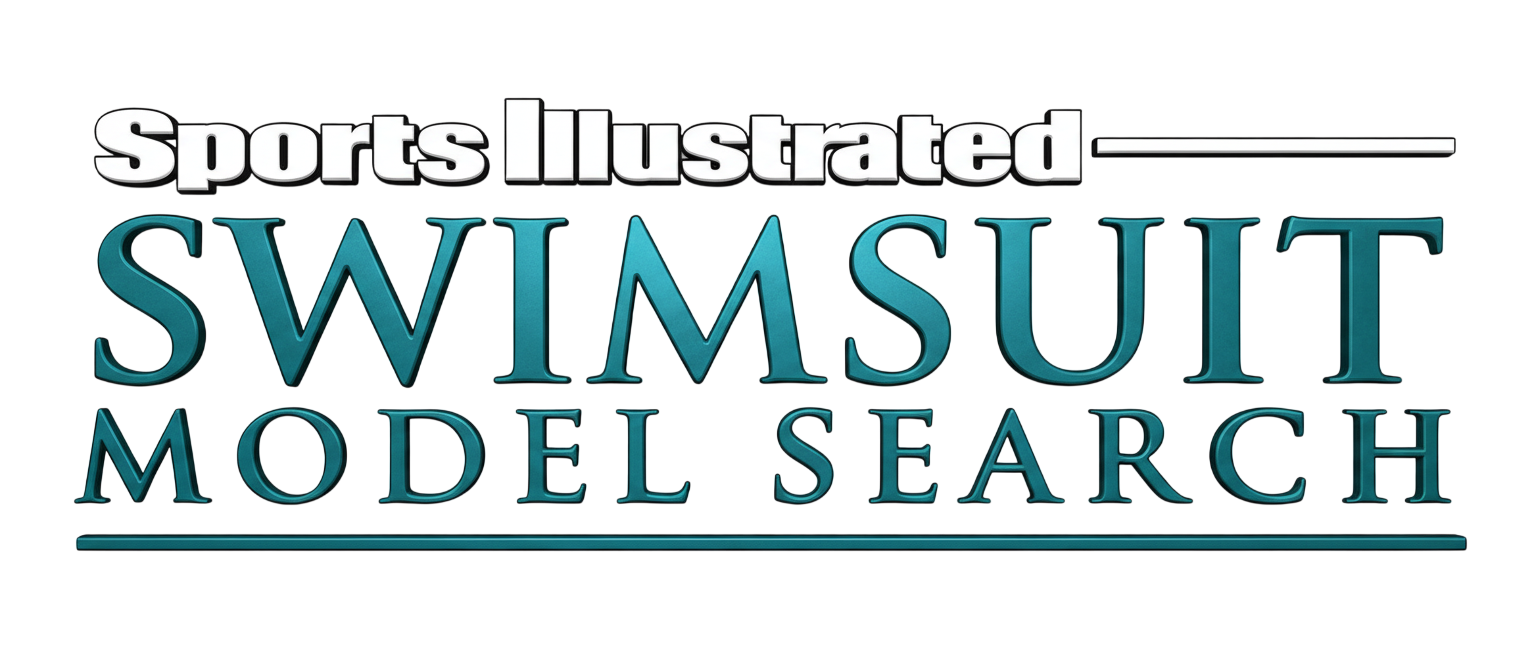
- Judges: Roshumba Williams; Joel Wilkenfeld; Jule Campbell
- No. of episodes: 5

Original release
- Network: NBC
- Release: January 2005

The Sports Illustrated Swimsuit Model Search is a reality television show produced by NBC that debuted in January 2005, prior to the launch of that year's Sports Illustrated Swimsuit Issue in February.

== Premise ==
The show documented twelve previously unknown fashion models as they competed against one another for a pictorial in the 2005 edition of the Sports Illustrated Swimsuit Issue in addition to a modeling contract with NEXT Model Management worth 1 million dollars.

The twelve contestants were chosen after NBC and Sports Illustrated launched a nationwide search of 3,000 women. The finalists were judged on their photo shoots as well fitness tests.

The show's tagline was "The business of being beautiful is about to get ugly."

== Judges ==
- Roshumba Williams, former Sports Illustrated Swimsuit Model
- Joel Wilkenfeld, president of NEXT Model Management
- Jule Campbell, founder of the SI Swimsuit Issue and former editor

== Contestants ==
(In order of elimination)

Week 1 – Come As You Are

- Marcela Ziemiansk
- Nancy Stelmaszcyzk
- Sabrina Sikora
- Shantel VanSanten

Week 2 – 70s Shoot

- Adaora Akubilo
- Stella Diaz

Week 3 – Freeze Frame

- Krisi Ballentine
- Betti Formeus

Week 4 – Runway

- Jenna Spilde

Week 5 – Final Shoot

- Stacy Klimek
- Shannon Hughes (runner-up)
- Alicia Hall (winner)

== Sports Illustrated Swim Search ==
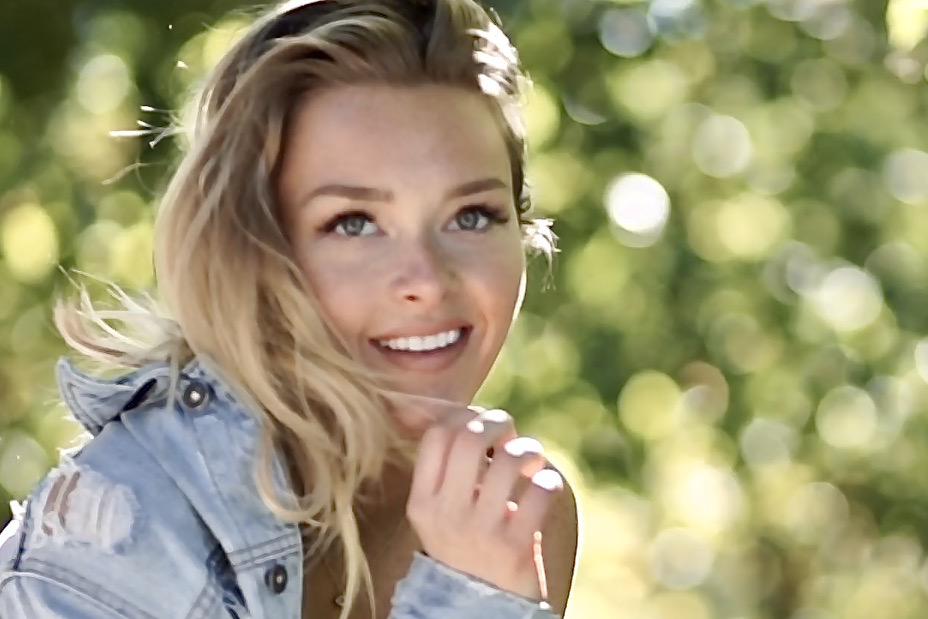
Camille Kostek won the first ever Sports Illustrated Swim Search in 2018, eventually landing a solo cover the following year

In 2017, the issue hosted its first ever open casting call where aspirants were asked to submit a 60-second video via Instagram. The three-part series called Sports Illustrated Swim Search which documented the first ever open casting call with Camille Kostek as a winner (becoming a cover model in 2019) premiered on SI TV and Amazon Prime Video in February 2018. The following year, the model search held an in-person open casting call in Miami, and has been held annually since. The 2019 show of finalists was characterized as the magazine's most diverse group of models in its history, featuring among others 55-year-old model Kathy Jacobs, alopecia sufferer Christie Valdiserri, and plus-sized model Ashley Alexiss.

== See also ==
- List of Sports Illustrated Swimsuit Issue cover models
- List of Sports Illustrated Swimsuit Issue models
