= Sports Illustrated: Exposure =

2005 photography book

- Author: Raphael Mazzucco
- Cover artist: Steven Hoffman
- Language: English
- Genre: Photography
- Publisher: Time Publishing
- Publication date: 2006
- Pages: 144
- ISBN: 1-933405-85-6

Sports Illustrated: Exposure (ISBN 1-933405-85-6, LCCN 2006-900231 is a collection of photographs taken by photographer Raphael Mazzucco in the summer of 2005. The photo shoot spanned nine days on a Caribbean island with eight Sports Illustrated Swimsuit Issue cover models.

The 144-page book was published in 2006, several months after the release of the 2006 Swimsuit Issue. All the models that were featured on the cover were part of this book. The shoot was a "reunion shoot" featuring models such as: Elsa Benítez, Yamila Diaz-Rahi, Rachel Hunter, Elle Macpherson, Carolyn Murphy, Daniela Peštová, Rebecca Romijn and Veronica Vařeková.

The cover price was $29.95 (US) and $39.95 (Canada). The cover and layout of the book was designed by Steven Hoffman. The producer of the photo shoot was Diane Smith, while M. J. Day and Jennifer Kaplan were the project co-ordinators.
