= Jule Campbell =

American magazine editor (1925/1926–2022)

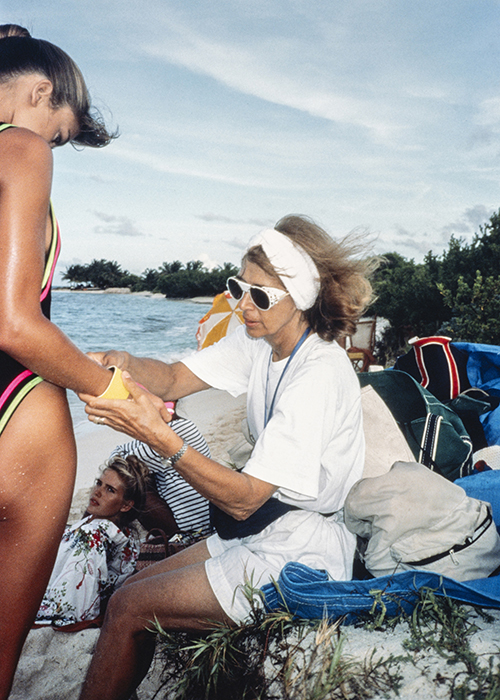
- Campbell with Kathy Ireland in 1989
- Died: 19 November 2022; Raritan Township, New Jersey, U.S.
- Education: Stephens College; University of Missouri
- Occupation: Magazine editor
- Known for: Founding editor of the Sports Illustrated Swimsuit Issue
- Spouse: Ronald Campbell (m. 1956; died 2015)
- Children: 1

Jule Campbell (1925 or 1926 – November 19, 2022) was an American magazine editor. She was the founding editor of the Sports Illustrated Swimsuit Issue, which she oversaw for 32 years from its creation in 1964 until her retirement in 1996. Under her editorship, the annual feature grew from a brief mid-winter photo spread into one of the most profitable and widely discussed franchises in American magazine publishing, and it was credited with helping to launch the careers of models including Cheryl Tiegs, Christie Brinkley, Paulina Porizkova, Elle Macpherson, Kathy Ireland and Tyra Banks.

== Career ==
=== Early career ===
Campbell graduated from Stephens College in Missouri and studied journalism at the University of Missouri. Campbell began her career as an assistant at Glamour magazine, where she rose to become accessories editor. In 1960 she joined Sports Illustrated as a fashion writer and reporter in the magazine's fashion department.

=== Sports Illustrated Swimsuit Issue ===
In 1964, managing editor André Laguerre assigned Campbell to produce a swimwear feature to fill the slow period in the sporting calendar during the winter months. The resulting cover feature, with model Babette March photographed in a white two-piece swimsuit, is considered the first Swimsuit Issue. The first model Campbell personally selected was Sue Peterson, who appeared on the 1965 cover.

Campbell's editorial approach departed from the fashion industry's prevailing preference for very thin models; she instead sought what she described as more natural-looking women, many of whom she scouted in California. She was also the first editor to insist that the models' names be printed alongside their photographs, a decision intended to present them as individuals rather than anonymous figures. She later reflected, "I wanted them to look like real people that were beautiful". Kathy Ireland credited Campbell with having "humanized models", saying that Campbell gave them a voice at a time when models at other magazines were expected only to pose. The visibility the issue provided helped usher in the era of the supermodel.

The Swimsuit Issue became both a commercial success, generating substantial revenue for the magazine, and a recurring source of controversy: supporters viewed it as a celebration of women, while feminist critics protested it as objectification and some readers cancelled subscriptions in response. The 1978 edition, featuring Cheryl Tiegs in a white mesh swimsuit, reportedly set a record for the volume of reader letters received.

Campbell retired in 1996 after 32 years as editor of the Swimsuit Issue. Her final issue featured Tyra Banks—the first Black model to appear on its cover—alongside Argentine model Valeria Mazza. Beginning in 1997, the year after her departure, the Swimsuit Issue was published as a standalone edition separate from the regular magazine.

Campbell on location during production of the 1989 Sports Illustrated Swimsuit Issue

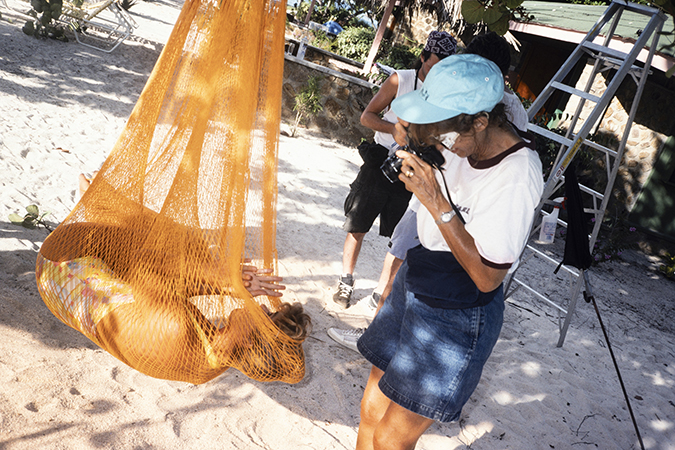
Campbell with Kathy Ireland

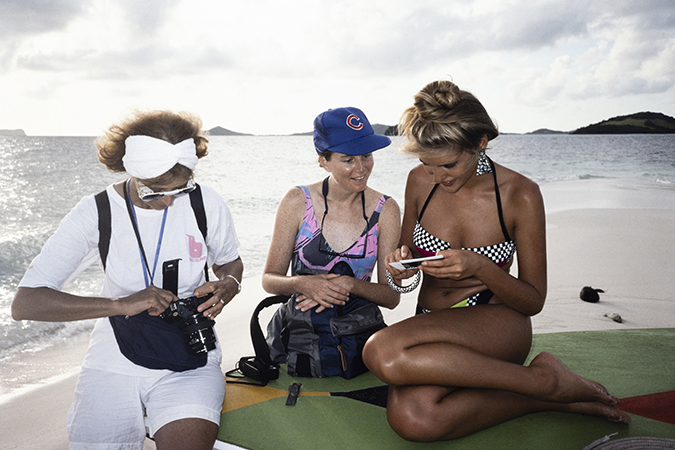
Campbell with Christine Walker and Judit Mascó

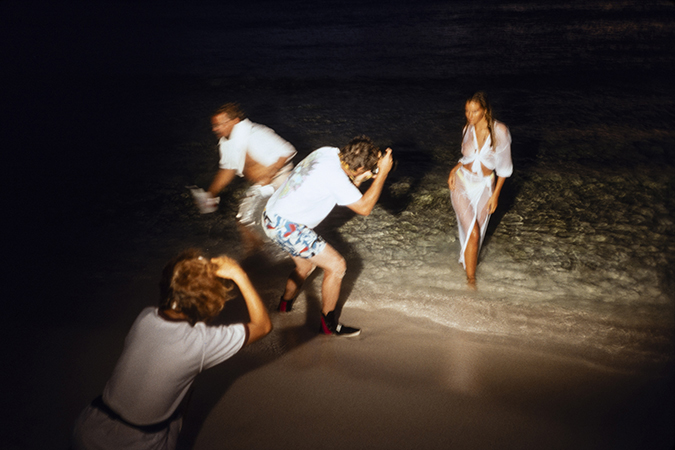
Campbell with Walker and Mascó

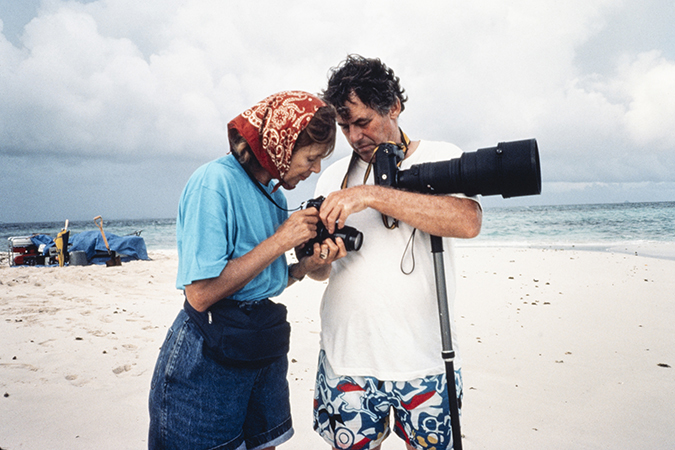
Campbell with photographer Robert Huntzinger

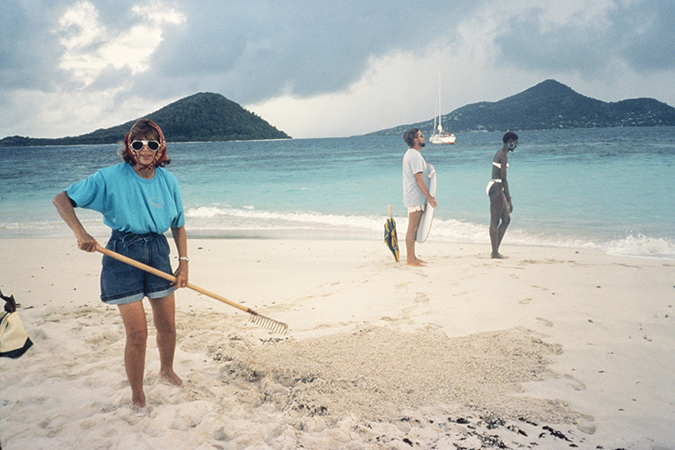
Campbell in Saint Vincent and the Grenadines

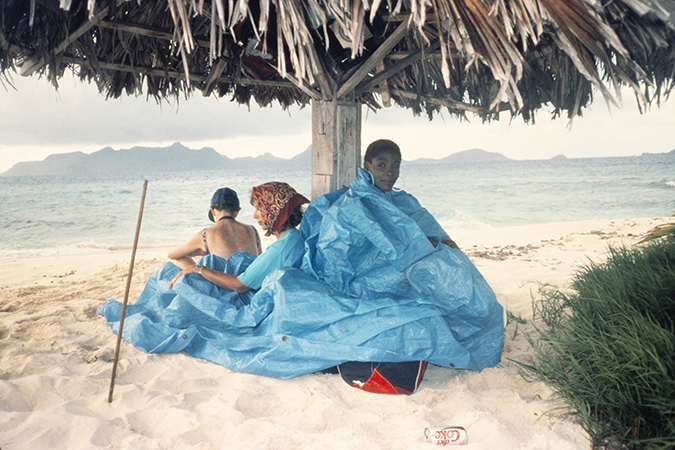
Campbell with Roshumba Williams

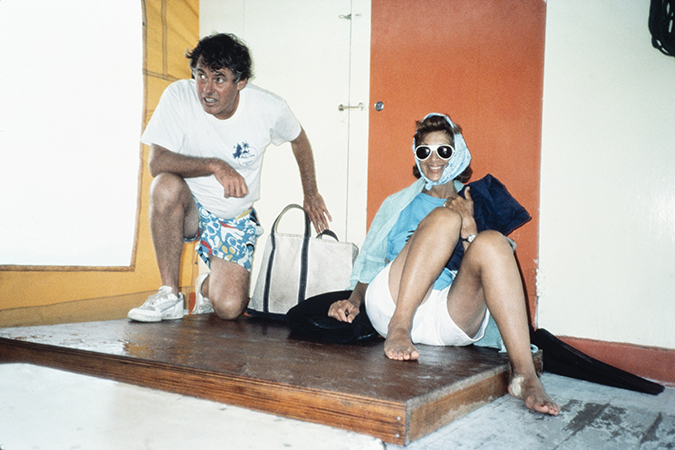
Campbell with Roshumba Williams

== Personal life ==
In 1956, Campbell married Ronald Campbell, a longtime art director at Fortune magazine; they remained married for nearly six decades until his death in 2015. The couple had a son, Bruce.

Campbell died on November 19, 2022, in Raritan Township, New Jersey, at the age of 96. The cause of death was complications of pneumonia.

== Legacy ==
A documentary film about Campbell, Beyond the Gaze: Jule Campbell's Swimsuit Issue, was directed by her daughter-in-law, filmmaker Jill Campbell, and wrapped production in 2024. The film had its world premiere at the Woodstock Film Festival in October 2024 and was subsequently screened at festivals including the Newport Beach Film Festival, the Montclair Film Festival and DOC NYC. It features interviews with Campbell and with models whose careers she supported, including Brinkley, Banks, Macpherson, Porizkova, Ireland and Carol Alt, and received awards including Best Documentary at the Omaha Film Festival.
