= Danielle Herrington =

American model

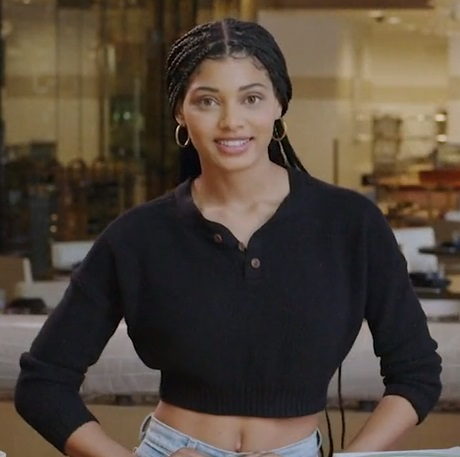
- Herrington in 2021
- Born: Danielle Nicole Herrington; May 26, 1993 (age 33); Compton, California, U.S.
- Occupation: Model
- Years active: 2015–present
- Modeling information
- Height: 1.78 m (5 ft 10 in)
- Hair color: Dark Brown
- Eye color: Hazel
- Agency: Elite Model Management (New York); Women Management (Paris); Milk Management (London); Modelwerk (Hamburg)

Danielle Nicole Herrington (born May 26, 1993) is an American model known for her appearances in the Sports Illustrated Swimsuit Issue, including the cover of the 2018 edition where she became the third African-American woman to appear on the cover — after Tyra Banks (1997) and Beyonce (2007).

== Background ==
Herrington was raised in Compton, California, but rose to fame after becoming a resident of Brooklyn's Bushwick neighborhood. Growing up, she attended Gahr High School in Cerritos, California, before dropping out her sophomore year to be homeschooled, so she can focus on her modeling career. Herrington came from a working family. She describes her childhood as normal and says she was focused on school until college.

== Career ==
Herrington started envisioning herself as a professional model at the age of 8. She attended John Casablancas' modelling school at age 10 or 11 with the encouragement of her mother. She began modelling at age 13, and Herrington was featured in GQ in November 2016 before she had 10,000 Instagram followers as an Instagram model on the rise who had already done jobs for Victoria's Secret. She first appeared in the Swimsuit issue in 2017, which she booked four months after moving to New York City to pursue her career at age 21. The 2017 Swimsuit issue photoshoot, which took place in Fiji, was her first major photoshoot. Her first runway performance was her New York Fashion Week debut at the Philipp Plein's spring show in September 2017 along with Irina Shayk and Adriana Lima. She was selected as the SI Swimsuit issue cover model for the 2018 issue, becoming the third black woman to appear on the cover of the Swimsuit Issue—after Tyra Banks (1997) and Beyonce (2007). Herrington shot the 2018 Swimsuit Issue in the Bahamas. She walked the runway for Plein the second time for its Fall 2018 show.
