= Carla Campbell =

Jamaican fashion model

Carla Campbell (born 22 November 1980 in Jamaica) is a fashion model represented by IMG in New York. She received her most well-known exposure appearing in the 2006 Sports Illustrated Swimsuit Issue.

== Information ==
Campbell is the first lady from the Caribbean to appear in the popular Sports Illustrated Swimsuit Issue in 2006. She is also the second lady from the Caribbean to be featured in Victoria's Secret. She has the rare characteristic of having relatively large, natural breasts along with a toned and athletic body. Campbell is also has a modeling contract with Pulse Fashion and is a part of the Beauty Hall of Fame in Jamaica.

== Clients ==
Campbell's clients include L'Oréal, Nike, Avon, Seventeen magazine, Footlocker, Miller Beer, Maxim, Target and Fubu.
