= Stella Díaz =

Puerto Rican model

Stella Diaz
- Born: Stella Diaz; December 14, 1984 (age 41); Puerto Rico
- Occupation: Model

Stella Diaz (born December 14, 1984) is a Puerto Rican fashion model and former contestant on the NBC reality television show Sports Illustrated Swimsuit Model Search. Diaz was the only Latina to participate on the program, which premiered on January 5, 2005, on NBC and ended with the season finale on February 9, 2005. She was eliminated on the second episode and was the sixth model eliminated out of 12 contestants.

Since her appearance on the show, Diaz has continued to work as a professional model in Puerto Rico. She has received three Paoli Awards for Model of the Year: one in 2006 and two in 2005, Orlando Edition and Puerto Rico Edition.

She is a 2007 magna cum laude graduate of Universidad del Sagrado Corazón.
