= André Laguerre =

Journalist and magazine editor

- Born: Marc André Laguerre; February 21, 1915; Ottery St. Mary, Devon, England
- Died: January 18, 1979 (aged 63); New York City, United States
- Known for: Longtime managing editor of Sports Illustrated

Marc André Laguerre (February 21, 1915 – January 18, 1979) was a journalist and magazine editor, best known as the managing editor of Sports Illustrated from 1960 to 1974, during which time he oversaw the growth in the magazine from a niche publication to become the industry leader in weekly sports magazines. It was under his leadership that the annual Sports Illustrated Swimsuit Issue was first published. When he retired in 1974, he had been managing editor of the magazine for 704 issues, then a record among magazines published by Time, Inc., SI's parent company.

== Early life and family ==
André Laguerre was born June 7, 1915, in England to Frenchman Léon James Laguerre and his English wife, Dorothy. He was the oldest of three children; he had a younger brother, Leon and a younger sister, Odette. His father was in the French diplomatic corps, and the family moved frequently during his early years. Before the age of ten, Andre had lived in England, France and Syria. In the summer of 1927, his father took a post at the French Consulate General in San Francisco. The family lived in the upper-class neighborhood of Sea Cliff, and Andre attended a number of private schools, including the Santa Monica School and St. Ignatius College Preparatory. While in San Francisco, he became a fan of American sports, especially baseball, and also had his first job in journalism, as a copyboy for the San Francisco Chronicle. In 1929, he was sent back to England for school. He graduated in 1931, having earned an Oxford Certificate, but he declined to matriculate at Oxford University, instead preferring to pursue a career as a journalist. He enrolled in a correspondence course, and took a job at a book store to support himself.

== Early career and military service ==
He worked hard for many years as a freelance journalist, and began to be noticed for his writing. He wrote for both English language and French language publications. In 1938, he covered the Munich Agreement for the French daily Paris-Soir. When World War II broke out, he enlisted in the French Army as a corporal. His first assignment was on patrol on the Maginot Line. He later served as a liaison to the British forces at Arras, and remained with them until the Battle of Arras forced their retreat. He stayed with the British forces until the Dunkirk evacuation in 1940, where he was one of the last to be evacuated. His evacuation ship was sunk by a mine, and he was rescued by a British destroyer, bleeding heavily from a neck wound. Laguerre credited his rescue to his ease with the English language (his rescuers took him for British). He criticised his rescuers in later years for refusing to help Frenchmen who were around him; many of them drowned.

After his rescue and recovery from his injuries, days after Charles de Gaulle's famous June 18th Speech, he was given the option of being discharged from his duties, or to join the Free French forces. He chose the latter. He was assigned as a sentry guarding Charles de Gaulle's headquarters. While at that post, he wrote a letter to de Gaulle suggesting techniques to improve the morale of Free French troops. De Gaulle took immediate notice, making him assistant to the chief press attachè. Within a few months, de Gaulle moved Laguerre into the chief position himself, making him his primary press liaison. He followed de Gaulle on his travels to North Africa in 1943 to inspect Free French forces there, and to Washington, D.C., to visit with American President Franklin Delano Roosevelt in 1944. He stayed on de Gaulle's staff for a while after the war, but after interviewing with Henry Luce, the head of Time, Inc., he left de Gaulle's service to accept a job writing for Time magazine.

== Time ==
Laguerre began his Time career in 1946 as one of the magazine's European correspondents. Working mainly out of the Time Paris bureau, he hobnobbed with Paris's top citizens; he was a frequent dinner guest of Albert Camus. He also maintained his connection to sports, first acquired in his youth in San Francisco, by moonlighting as a sports reporter for the Paris-based English-language International Herald Tribune, writing a horse racing column under the pseudonym "Eddie Snow".

Meanwhile, Laguerre was attracting the attention of Time, Inc.'s top brass. In 1948, he was promoted to Paris bureau chief and, in December 1950, he was brought to New York City by Time founder Henry Luce for a special one-year assignment to work out of the main Time offices. He returned to Europe in 1951 to serve as London bureau chief. In 1955, after the sudden death of the Paris bureau chief, he was given that position back, and for a time he held both posts simultaneously. While Time bureau chief of London and Paris, he also spent some time writing about his favorite subject, sports, for the magazine, for which he covered the 1948 Winter Olympics in St. Moritz, Switzerland, and the 1952 Summer Olympics in Helsinki, Finland. In early 1956, he accepted a temporary assignment to head a contingent of writers to cover the 1956 Winter Olympics in Cortina d'Ampezzo, Italy for Time, Inc.'s fledgling Sports Illustrated, started two years earlier by Luce. His first article for the magazine was a piece on the dominance of the Soviet Union in their first Winter Olympics. Three months later, Luce installed him as assistant managing editor of Sports Illustrated.

On June 7, 1955, Laguerre married Princess Nathalie Alexandria Kotchoubey de Beauharnais, a Russian princess and descendant of both Catherine the Great and Joséphine de Beauharnais. The couple had met in 1943 while André was working for General de Gaulle, and Nathalie was a reporter for Time. They had two daughters, Michèle Anne Laguerre and Claudine Hélène Laguerre.

== Sports Illustrated ==
As assistant managing editor, his first major assignment was to head the team of reporters and photographers covering the 1956 Summer Olympics in Melbourne, Australia. Among those traveling with Laguerre were Roger Bannister, the former British track and field star and first man in history to run a competition mile in under four minutes, and Roy Terrell, who would eventually succeed Laguerre as managing editor of Sports Illustrated.

=== Managing editor ===
It doesn't matter what you write about. All that matters is how well you write.

— André Laguerre

Laguerre was promoted to managing editor of Sports Illustrated in May 1960, after four years as assistant managing editor. His time at the magazine was instrumental in saving what was, when he took over, a financially insolvent publication. He would serve as managing editor for fourteen years, leading the magazine for a total of 704 issues, then a record among Time, Inc. managing editors. During his tenure, the circulation grew from 900,000 to 2,250,000 issues, and the advertising budget grew from $11.9 million to $72.2 million. He altered the look and feel of the magazine, changing its focus from a lifestyle magazine that focused on leisure sports, to one that covered the major American team sports, at a time when television vastly altered the way in which such sports were covered. As such, he kept Sports Illustrated at the head of the growth of interest in these sports. He also placed a heavy emphasis on the use of color photography and late deadline, to keep the magazine up to date and visually appealing. He hired and encouraged writers who were masters at prose, emphasizing writing over sportswriting, and the crop of writers he brought to the magazine, including Frank Deford, Dan Jenkins, Budd Schulberg, and Gil Rogin, helped change the way people wrote about sports.

Laguerre had been very guarded about his personal life among his coworkers. Deford, who worked closely with him for many years, and who looked up to him as a mentor, said of him, "Laguerre was a fascinating paradox: He was almost constitutionally withdrawn, but among the friends he chose, he was magnetic." One publisher called him "A powerful personality" while another called him "A close-mouthed, self-contained man who seemed forbidding to some ... despite his reserve, [his] personality was pervading, dominating; he exuded strength and leadership."

Among his more curious and enduring innovations was the Sports Illustrated Swimsuit Issue. The winter months, between the college bowl season and the start of Major League Baseball's spring training, was a slow time for sports journalism. At the time, winter team sports like basketball and ice hockey were regional niche sports, and there was little to write about. Laguerre had instituted an annual February issue titled "Fun in the Sun", where he sent his staff to an exotic locale to write about and photograph it for his readers. In 1964, he asked Jule Campbell, then a fashion reporter for Sports Illustrated, to "go to some beautiful place and put a pretty girl on the cover" of that year's "Fun in the Sun" issue. That year's issue featured only five pages of girls in swimsuits, and still predominantly featured travel writing, including articles about snorkeling and fish-watching. With the help of that year's "Fun in the Sun" issue, 1964 became the first year that Sports Illustrated would turn a profit. Though originally only planned as a one-off event, Laguerre was convinced by Sports Illustrated art director Dick Gangel to bring back the swimsuits in 1965, only "a lot sexier". Laguerre once again assigned Jule Campbell to scout models and locations. The 1965 issue contained an article entitled "The Nudity Cult" and de-emphasized the travelogue-like writing of previous "Fun in the Sun" issues from which it evolved. Since then, the Swimsuit Issue has become the biggest selling issue of the magazine, and a major cross-over publication for the fashion and modeling worlds as well.

Laguerre's tenure as managing editor had a profound effect on the other 51 issues of the year as well. During the magazine's first several years, prior to Laguerre's arrival, the magazine did not place major American team sports at the forefront. As an example, during 1955 and 1956, the magazine's first two years, it featured as many articles on fishing as on professional football, 23 articles. By 1965–1966, five years into Laguerre's term, the magazine published only eight articles on fishing, while it published over 60 articles on pro football.

Besides changing the types of sports being covered, the manner in which they were covered changed as well. Under earlier managing editors, the magazine's writing and editorial staff was organized by department. Thus, there was a fashion department, a travel department, and a sports department, which covered all sports. Laguerre reorganized the magazine, giving each sport its own separate department, so there would be a dedicated staff of writers in the baseball department, and a different boxing department, and another for pro football, and so on. Laguerre also encouraged serious investigative journalism, and did not shy away from controversial issues. In 1961, writer Ray Cave broke a story on point shaving in college basketball. In 1968, under Laguerre's direction, and under secrecy from his superiors, the magazine ran a five-part series on the experience of black athletes in America.

Laguerre's later years showed less success as the magazine became an industry leader. In 1968, its coverage of the Mexico City Olympics was heavily criticized, having been "scooped" on most stories by both Time and Life magazines. A 1969 book by Jack Olsen, titled The Girls in the Office, embarrassed Time Inc. over its treatment of its female employees, including those at Sports Illustrated. In 1970, 23 women on staff at Sports Illustrated signed a petition demanding equal treatment. Laguerre relented, promoting Pat Ryan to senior editor, and paying her the same as the men in her same position. By 1973, Laguerre's leadership was under a direct challenge from within his staff and from his superiors. A January 1973 story in New York Magazine was highly critical of the degrading quality of the writing and of the stagnating corporate culture at Sports Illustrated. By September of that year, Laguerre was asked to step down as managing editor. He was offered an executive position in corporate offices which he refused and his resignation was complete by February 1, 1974.

== Later career and death ==
There were only two people in his life he truly admired. One was General de Gaulle and the other was Harry Luce.

— Nathalie Kotchoubey Laguerre

After retiring as managing editor, he remained with Sports Illustrated in order to head a group looking into publishing international editions of the magazine. He was offered the job as managing editor of Playboy, and, insulted by the low $45,000 salary Hugh Hefner offered him, he turned the job down. In 1975, he founded a bi-monthly horse-racing magazine, Classic, which he headed until shortly before his death of a heart attack in New York on January 18, 1979, at the age of sixty-three.
