= Ariel Meredith =

American model (born 1986)

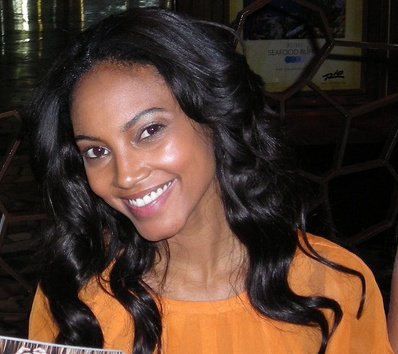
- Meredith in 2009
- Born: July 11, 1986 (age 39); Shreveport, Louisiana, U.S.
- Modeling information
- Height: 1.79 m (5 ft 10 1/2 in)
- Hair color: Naturally black
- Eye color: Brown
- Agency: Supreme Management (New York)

Ariel Meredith (born July 11, 1986) is an American model who appeared in the 2009, 2012, 2013, 2014 and 2015 Sports Illustrated Swimsuit Issue. Born in Shreveport, Louisiana, she did some part-time modeling starting in 1998 until she finished her schooling.

== Background ==
A native of Shreveport, Louisiana, she was senior class parliamentarian and a senior senator on the student council of her 2001–2002 class at Huntington High School. After high school graduation, she moved to New York City. Meredith's mother's name is Marjorie Meredith and her father's name is David Meredith.

== Career ==
Although she was discovered at age 14 she did not pursue modeling as a full-time career until after she completed her education in 2008. In 1998, she won a 500-contestant modeling competition in Dallas and signed with Ford Models in New York and Campbell Modeling Agency in Dallas. She got 32 call-backs from the contest. As a teenager she appeared in Seventeen, Teen Cosmopolitan, Cosmopolitan, and Teen magazines. She began traveling domestically while still in school. In 2002, she appeared on the MTV show Fashionably Loud. She started modeling regularly in 2005. When one of her early modeling agencies demanded that she have breast reduction surgery, she refused and was dropped from the agency.

The New York Times mentioned her YouTube beauty secret video on using a toothbrush to exfoliate one's lips prior to applying lip gloss in 2007. She debuted for Vera Wang's Spring Show in New York in September 2008. Her September 2008 New York Fashion week runway debut experience, where she also modeled for Nicole Miller, was chronicled in the USA Today. She appeared in shows for a total of eleven fashion designers including an opening performance for Junya Watanabe, which marked her rising stardom. After her shows in New York, she did eight shows in Milan. She has performed in runway shows for Baby Phat, Brioni, Clips, Diesel, D&G, Elie Saab, Junya Watanabe, La Perla, Milly, Vera Wang and many more. According to The Times-Picayune, her September 2008 New York and Milan Fashion week performances led to her classification as a rising star in the modeling industry.

She is featured in the 2009 Spring/Summer Dolce & Gabbana advertising campaign, which was shot by Mario Testino. She has also posed for J.Crew, Ann Taylor Loft, H&M, David's Bridal, Cover Girl eyewear, Fossil, Target, Garnier Fructis, Nine West, Rocawear, Victoria's Secret, The Limited, Sephora, Levi's, and Gap. Meredith shot the 2009 Swimsuit issue at beaches, lagoons, cantinas and nature preserves near Tulum, Mexico on the Mayan Riviera. As of 2014, she is represented by Supreme Management in New York City.
