= May Andersen =

Danish model

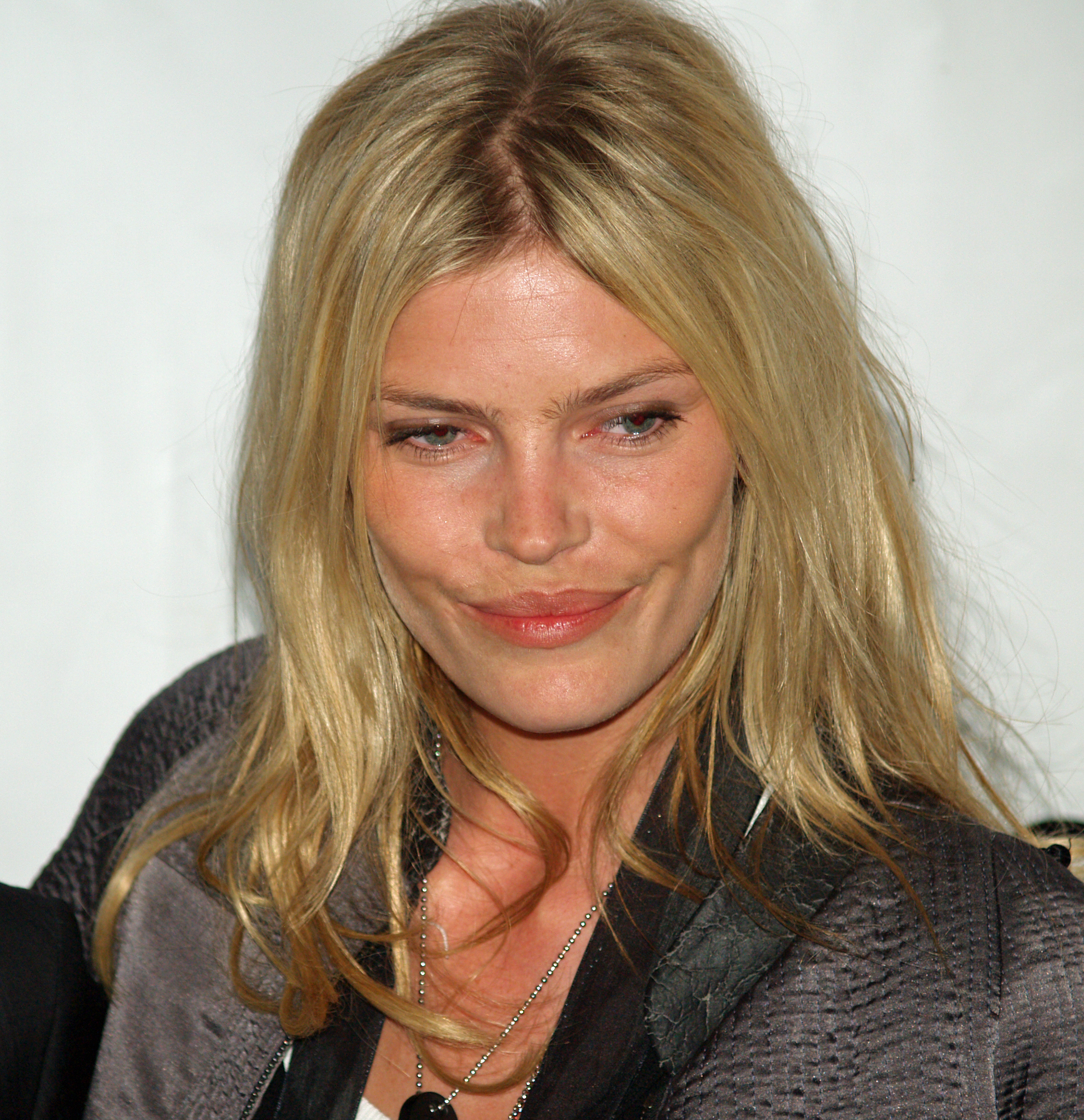
- May Andersen at the 2008 Tribeca Film Festival.
- Born: Lykke May Andersen; 16 June 1982 (age 44); Copenhagen, Denmark
- Modeling information
- Height: 5 ft 10 in (1.78 m)
- Hair color: Blonde
- Eye color: Blue

Lykke May Andersen (born 16 June 1982) is a Danish model. Her work includes appearances for Miu Miu, Victoria's Secret, and the Sports Illustrated Swimsuit Issue. She was also assistant director of The Hole, an art gallery in New York City, and appeared in the Danish film A Second Chance.

== Career ==
Anderson appeared in Miu Miu's spring 1999 ready-to-wear campaign. Vogue's archive entry for the collection states that the campaign featured Anderson and James Rousseau. She also appeared in the Sports Illustrated Swimsuit Issue, including the 2004 issue.

In 2012, Anderson was working full-time as assistant director of The Hole, a contemporary art gallery in New York City. That year, she appeared on the cover of the May 2012 issue of Playboy, and the gallery hosted a signing connected to the issue.

In 2024, Anderson appeared as Sanne in A Second Chance, a Danish drama directed by Susanne Bier.

Anderson later returned to runway and fashion work. Vogue included her among 1990s and early-2000s models who appeared during the fall 2024 runway season, listing her appearance for Miu Miu. Models.com also listed 2025 work including a novembre magazine editorial and runway appearances for Rotate and Alis in Copenhagen.

== Personal life ==
Anderson has a son with artist and filmmaker Julian Schnabel, born in June 2013. By late 2014, Anderson had moved back to Denmark. A Danish media release connected to an Elle interview stated that the move was partly because she wanted her son to have a connection to Denmark.
