= Myla Dalbesio =

American model, artist, and writer

Myla Grace Dalbesio
- Born: June 26, 1987 (age 39); Harrisburg, Pennsylvania, U.S.
- Occupation: Model
- Title: Miss Wisconsin Teen-USA 2004
- Modeling information
- Height: 5 ft 10.5 in (1.79 m)
- Hair color: Brunette
- Eye color: Blue-green
- Agency: JAG Models (New York); Next Model Management (Paris, Milan); Milk Management (London); Francina Models (Barcelona); Mother Management (St. Louis) (mother agency)

Myla Grace Dalbesio (born June 26, 1987) is an American model, artist, and writer.

== Career ==
=== Pageantry and modeling ===
On Sept. 20, 2003, 16-year-old Myla Grace Dalbesio of Racine, Wisconsin was crowned Miss Wisconsin Teen USA 2004 in Lake Delton, Wisconsin during her first attempt at the state teen title. Through the pageant she was scouted by Missouri talent agents Jeff and Mary Clarke, who tried to put her in regular-size modeling. She did not place among the 15 semi-finalists in the 2004 Miss Teen-USA pageant on August 6, 2004, in Palm Springs, California.

After being turned away by "straight-size" model agents at a scouting event in St. Louis, Missouri, at age 16, Dalbesio was eventually signed by the Ford Modeling Agency as a plus-size model (size 10), when she came in for a meeting at age 18.

She has appeared in editorials for magazines including LOVE, Purple, Vogue India, Dazed & Confused, Lui, Bon, Oyster, Twin, Viva Moda, Elle France, and Elle Italia.

In December 2014, Dalbesio appeared on the cover of Lady magazine, shot by Daniel Arnold. In April 2015, she was featured on the cover of Tush Magazine, photographed by Armin Morbach, followed by covers for Glamour Iceland, Madame, Lifetsyle, Suited, Feeling, and a self-portrait for P Magazine.

Dalbesio was selected for Calvin Klein's "Perfectly Fit" underwear campaign in 2014. Her designation as "plus-size" caused some controversy. In an interview with Elle magazine, Dalbesio said although she was larger than previous models used in Klein campaigns, she considers herself "in-between" rather than plus sized.

In 2015, Dalbesio was placed on Models.com's "Hot List", and Maxim magazine's Hot 100 for 2015.

Dalbesio has appeared in campaigns for Intimissimi, H&M, Levis, Abercrombie & Fitch, and Coach.

She was named the face and brand ambassador for Prima Donna Lingerie for years 2016 through 2019. In 2019 she designed an exclusive capsule collection for Prima Donna. The collection included lingerie, swimwear, and sportswear for women with a larger cup size and a streetwear sensibility.

In 2016 Dalbesio photographed herself for a self-portrait story for the first non-nude issue of Playboy.

Dalbesio made her debut in the Sports Illustrated Swimsuit Issue in 2017, and continued to appear in the swimsuit issue for four consecutive years.

=== Art ===
In 2011, she had three performance art shows, called Homecoming, Homecoming: Sophomore Year, and her Young Money exhibition. Her last performance art piece, titled Young Money, was reviewed favorably by The New York Times.

Dalbesio has exhibited her work internationally, and published two books. The first, Born Rich, was published by Edition Faust in 2013, and the second, Studies of Ecstasy, was published by Melville Brand Design in 2015.

In 2016 Dalbesio curated an all-female art show for the New York-based fair SPRING/BREAK. Titled You Can Call Me Baby, the show featured artists whose work "aimed to reclaim symbols traditionally used to undermine women". The show was lauded by critics, including gaining a glowing review from critic Paddy Johnson.

In the December 2016 Vulture, critic Jerry Saltz included the show in his list of the 10 Best Art Shows of 2016.

Dalbesio's photographs have appeared in magazines such as Playgirl, Playboy, HEARTS, 2003, and P Magazine, the latter of which included both interior and cover appearances.

In 2017 she launched a website called Our Stories, Ourselves with curator Jayne Johnson, which serves as a "non-partisan space for women to share their experiences" in video responses to weekly prompts.

=== Writing ===
Dalbesio has written short essays for a number of publications including Suited, Twin Magazine and Oyster, and wrote a regular column for Elle.com called "Girl on Girl".

== Personal life ==
Dalbesio identifies as a feminist. She married Nathan Hageman in 2018.
