= Jessica Van Der Steen =

Belgian fashion model

- Born: 9 July 1984 (age 42); Antwerp, Belgium
- Modeling information
- Height: 1.72 m (5 ft 8 in)
- Hair color: Blond
- Eye color: Blue
- Agency: Models Office - Brussels

Jessica Van Der Steen (born 9 July 1984 in Westmalle, Antwerp) is a Belgian fashion model.

== Career ==
Van Der Steen was first featured on the cover of the April 2000 edition of Ché magazine at age 16. In September 2003, she was also featured in the Dutch edition of ELLE. She then appeared in the Sports Illustrated Swimsuit Edition in both 2004 and 2005. Currently, Van Der Steen is a model for Victoria's Secret.
