= Yvette and Yvonne Sylvander =

Swedish models

External image
- The Sylvanders' Sports Illustrated Swimsuit Issue cover from January 19, 1976

Yvette and Yvonne Sylvander are Swedish twins who were the cover models who appeared as the first multi-subject Sports Illustrated Swimsuit Issue models. They appeared together on the swimsuit issue cover of the January 19, 1976, issue. They also appeared in the magazine.
