= MJ Day =

American magazine editor

- Education: University of Mary Washington
- Occupation: Editor-in-chief of the Sports Illustrated Swimsuit Issue

MJ Day is an American magazine editor who is the editor-in-chief of the Sports Illustrated Swimsuit Issue, which she has led since 2014.

== Overview ==
Day grew up in Ocean County, New Jersey and graduated from the University of Mary Washington in Fredericksburg, Virginia in 1997. She was an intern for InStyle, a fashion magazine, before being hired as an editorial assistant for the Sports Illustrated Swimsuit Issue in 1998. In 2013, she supervised the launch of the website Swim Daily; it promotes the swimsuit issue and its models year round. She became the swimsuit issue's editor-in-chief in 2014.

During her tenure, the swimsuit issue has introduced a greater range of body types and emphasized body positivity and women's empowerment. Robyn Lawley was the issue's first plus-size model in 2015. In the 2017 issue, Nina Agdal wore a tank top reading "A Woman Does Not Have to Be Modest to be Respected", while in 2018, models chose their own words and messages to portray in body paint in a spread. Leyna Bloom was the magazine's first openly transgender cover model in 2021.
