= Raphael Mazzucco =

Canadian and American photographer and contemporary artist

- Born: August 21, 1965 (age 61); Vancouver, British Columbia, Canada
- Known for: Fashion photography; mixed-media works incorporating resin and layered photographic techniques
- Notable work: Grass Roots; Motherland; Whispers of the Soul; GAIA
- Website: Official website

Raphael Mazzucco is a Canadian-American contemporary artist and fashion photographer based in the United States. He photographed the covers of the 2006, 2008 and 2009 editions of the Sports Illustrated Swimsuit Issue. The 2006 cover featured eight models, who also took part in a reunion photo shoot by Mazzucco for the book Sports Illustrated: Exposure.

His mixed-media work combines fashion photography with paint, collage and handwritten text. One example is his 2010 work Middle of Life, which the artist describes as combining photography, paint, resin and layered surfaces. Some of his works incorporate photographic prints encased in resin with ink and acrylic paint. His imagery often places the human figure within natural landscapes.

Mazzucco has exhibited internationally, including shows in London, Birmingham, New York City, Los Angeles, Miami Beach and Milan. His website and a 2018 exhibition article also report exhibitions in Florence and other cities during an international tour.

== Early life ==
Raphael Mazzucco was born in Vancouver, British Columbia, Canada. He grew up in an environment that combined physical discipline with creative curiosity, and developed an early connection to the natural landscapes of the Pacific Northwest, including coastal, forest, and mountainous environments that would later influence aspects of his visual work.

From an early age, he spent significant time outdoors, and this exposure to nature contributed to an awareness of light, space, and environment that would later inform his photographic approach.

Before pursuing photography, Mazzucco was involved in athletics, including professional soccer in Canada and in England. His experience in sport contributed to a structured sense of discipline, teamwork, and international exposure, and introduced him to different cultural environments at an early stage.

His entry into photography followed an early experience being photographed by Bruce Weber for a Calvin Klein commercial campaign, an encounter that exposed him to the creative process behind image-making and influenced his decision to pursue photography professionally.

Following this transition, Mazzucco relocated to New York City, where he began developing his photographic practice within the fashion and editorial industries. Immersed in the city’s creative environment, he refined his technical approach through observation, experimentation, and hands-on experience.

Although largely self-taught, he developed his practice through travel and direct engagement with different environments. During his early years as a photographer, he traveled extensively, including to regions in Africa, Southeast Asia, and Europe. These experiences contributed to a growing interest in photographing subjects within natural settings and diverse cultural contexts.

His work from this period began to reflect an emphasis on environment, human presence, and visual narrative, elements that would later become characteristic of his broader artistic practice.

Mazzucco’s early life and formative experiences including athletics, travel, and his introduction to photography contributed to the development of a visual language that would later bridge commercial fashion photography and contemporary art.

=== Fashion photography ===
Mazzucco established his career in fashion and commercial photography, working between Europe and the United States, including periods in Milan and New York City. His early work developed through a combination of editorial assignments, commercial campaigns, and extensive international travel, contributing to a visual style rooted in natural environments and cinematic composition.

He worked on advertising campaigns for Guess Jeans, including campaigns in the 2000s and 2010s.

Profile and market coverage has also associated his commercial photography with campaigns or work for brands and retailers including Victoria's Secret, Ralph Lauren, and Bergdorf Goodman.

His editorial photography has appeared in publications including Vogue, Marie Claire, and Vanity Fair, where his work has been associated with a visual approach combining fashion imagery with landscape and narrative elements.

Mazzucco gained broader recognition through his work for the Sports Illustrated Swimsuit Issue. His photographs appeared on the covers of the issue in 2006, 2008, and 2009.

His experience in fashion and editorial photography laid the foundation for his later transition into contemporary art, with recurring elements such as the human figure, natural settings, and travel-based imagery continuing into his mixed-media practice.

=== Contemporary art ===
Mazzucco later expanded his practice into contemporary art, developing a mixed-media approach that combines photography with paint, collage, text, and physical materials. His work often involves the manipulation of photographic prints through layering, tearing, and reassembly, creating compositions that bridge photography and painting.

A distinctive aspect of his practice is the incorporation of resin and other materials to encase and build layered surfaces, contributing to the physical depth and tactile quality of the works.

==== 2020s developments ====
In the 2020s, Mazzucco further developed this approach through a series of works that expanded his use of layered techniques and materials.

His series Grass Roots (2022) marked a significant phase in this evolution, drawing from a photographic archive spanning more than two decades and incorporating imagery from Africa, particularly the Maasai Mara. The works combined photographic imagery with pigments and natural materials, creating textured surfaces that merged documentary elements with painterly intervention.

The series was further developed in 2023 through additional works incorporating imagery from South America, including the Amazon rainforest, introducing a more vivid color palette and expanding the thematic focus on environment and cultural identity.

In Motherland (2024), Mazzucco continued this direction through a more personal narrative, referencing landscape and origin while maintaining his layered mixed-media approach.

His 2026 exhibition Whispers of the Soul further developed these themes, combining photography, paint, and hand-applied elements within compositions inspired by global landscapes, including Iceland, Africa, and Southeast Asia.

== Exhibitions ==
Mazzucco's work has been exhibited internationally in solo and group exhibitions, as well as at contemporary art fairs.

=== Solo exhibitions ===
In 2026, he presented the exhibition Whispers of the Soul (February 2026), presented by Castle Fine Art.

In 2025, he presented the solo exhibition Where Would You Be If You Closed Your Eyes? at Eastern Projects in Los Angeles.

His exhibition Dreamscape (2025) was presented by Castle Fine Art across multiple locations in the United Kingdom.

His exhibition Motherland (2024) was presented by Castle Fine Art across the United Kingdom.

His exhibition Grass Roots (2022) was presented at Castle Fine Art in Birmingham, United Kingdom.

Earlier exhibitions include Montauk (2014), presented at Castle Galleries in London.

His exhibition Lost in Dreams (2014) was presented at Vibe Gallery in Ibiza, Spain.

Additional exhibitions have been held in New York and Los Angeles, including presentations at galleries such as the Louis K. Meisel Gallery.

=== Group exhibitions ===
Mazzucco has participated in group exhibitions including Through the Lens: Masters of Photographic Artistry at West Chelsea Contemporary in New York.

=== Art fairs ===
His work has been presented at major art fairs including Art Miami, Palm Beach Modern + Contemporary, Art Market Hamptons, and associated exhibitions during Art Basel Miami Beach.

== Critical reception ==
Mazzucco's work has been discussed in the context of his transition from fashion photography to contemporary art.

Some coverage has emphasized the visual impact and material qualities of his work. Writing for Meer, his practice was described as "cutting edge, eminently credible and hugely prestigious", highlighting the integration of photography with layered mixed-media techniques.

Coverage in The Independent described his transition into fine art as producing "strikingly colourful artworks" and noted that his work entered the contemporary art context with growing visibility.

His background in fashion and commercial photography has also been cited as a defining influence on his visual language, particularly in relation to composition, subject, and use of environment.

== Publications ==
- Sports Illustrated: Exposure (2006)
- A Second Decade of Guess Images (2003)
- Culo (2011)

== Media ==
Mazzucco has made appearances in television and media productions, often in connection with his work as a photographer.

He appeared in the television series Entourage, as well as in the reality television program The Bachelor, where he was featured in relation to his work as a swimsuit photographer.

He was also credited in Exposure: Sports Illustrated Swimsuit 2011, a media production connected to the Sports Illustrated Swimsuit Issue.

== Personal life ==
Mazzucco has lived and worked internationally, including periods in New York City, Montauk, and London. He later established a base in Connecticut, where he maintains a studio practice.

He is married to Lisa Marie Mazzucco; they have one son, Sascha Mazzucco.

Mazzucco has continued to travel extensively, often working in remote and natural environments as part of his artistic practice.
