= Tanya Mityushina =

Russian model

- Born: 19 February 1993 (age 33); Perm, Russia
- Modeling information
- Height: 1.74 m (5 ft 8 1/2 in)
- Hair color: Blonde
- Eye color: Blue / Green
- Agency: Elite Model Management

Tatiana "Tanya" Mityushina (Russian: Татьяна Митюшина; born 19 February 1993) is a Russian model born in Perm. She was featured in the 2016 Sports Illustrated Swimsuit Issue.

== Life and career ==
Tanya Mityushina has worked for Victoria's Secret and Intimissimi. She appeared briefly in the film Don Jon. In 2016, Mityushina was one of the models chosen for the annual calendar of the Chilean CCU's Cristal beer.
