= Hailey Clauson =

American model

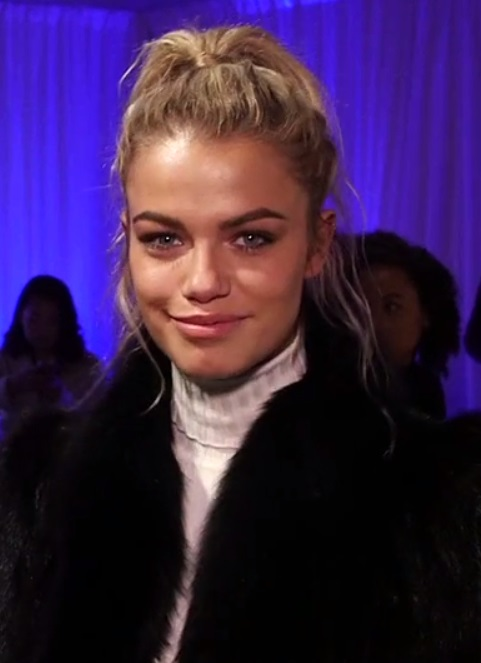
- Clauson at "Swim City", the Sports Illustrated Swimsuit Issue fan festival in Chelsea, Manhattan in New York, February 2016
- Born: Hailey Michele Clauson; March 7, 1995 (age 31); Thousand Oaks, California, U.S.
- Years active: 2009–present
- Modeling information
- Height: 1.80 m (5 ft 11 in)
- Hair color: Blonde
- Eye color: Blue
- Agency: Ford Models (New York City, Paris); Why Not Model Management (Milan); The Squad Management (London); View Management (Barcelona); Two Management (Copenhagen, Los Angeles, Toronto); Modelwerk (Hamburg); Chic Management (Sydney)

Hailey Michele Clauson (born March 7, 1995) is an American model. In 2016, she was one of three separate cover stars of the Sports Illustrated Swimsuit Issue.

== Career ==
Clauson was discovered on an open casting call in Los Angeles, Ford Models signed her on the spot, a "surreal" experience she recalled. Clauson began modeling at age 14, appearing in ad campaigns for Wild Fox Couture, Jag Jeans and in the Forever 21 catalog. Later in 2009 she left Ford Models and signed with Marilyn Agency. Also in 2009, she was featured Model of the Month in the October issue of Japanese Vogue. In September 2010 she made her catwalk debut at the spring ADAM show in New York and walked for Zac Posen and Calvin Klein. Clauson's debut season yielded such sensational results that Models.com listed her as being one of the Top 10 Newcomers for fashion week Spring/Summer 2011.

In 2011, she left Marilyn Agency and signed with Next Models. For SS11, her advertising campaigns included Mavi Jeans, Gucci, Dsquared2, and Jill Stuart. On February 18, Clauson appeared on E! News accompanied by her mother, for her first television interview. She appeared in the Fall/Winter campaigns for Topshop, Zara, Moussy, and Plein Sud as well as in Jay-Z’s alternative video, Empire State Of Mind which featured top models. Clauson appeared on E! News (her mother was with her) for her first TV interview which aired on February 18. Five days later, she became the subject of controversy when it was discovered that she walked in three of the major shows: Diane von Fürstenberg, DKNY, and Oscar de la Renta during New York Fashion Week while only 15, when the age limit set by the Council of Fashion Designers of America bans models below 16 for catwalk shows.

The fact that von Fürstenberg was president of the CFDA added to the controversy. Fürstenberg later said she did not know Clauson's age and apologized. Six months later, in August of 2012, Clauson made head-line news again when her parents reportedly were suing Urban Outfitters and two other retailers for the unauthorized use of risqué photos of Hailey on their t-shirts. The suit says the shirts "force" Clauson "to be the object of prurient interests and provides wallpaper for the likes of pedophiles." Clauson's parents sued all three retailers and the photographer for $28 million in damages. In February 2012, the case against the photographer was dismissed for lack of jurisdiction by the New York-based federal court. The other three defendants settled with Clauson. Controversy aside, Clauson was in the Fall/Winter campaigns for Topshop, Zara, Moussy, and Plein Sud in 2012.

In January 2014, model Hailey Clauson was the focus of an Agent Provocateur advertising campaign called "Behind Closed Doors," which was photographed by Miles Aldridge. Clauson appeared nude in body paint in the 2015 SI Swimsuit issue.

== Personal life ==
Clauson is an environmentalist and said that she does not own a car. Cameron Clauson, owner of a local movie company, Clauson Films said that he is related to her.
