= Ashley Richardson =

American model (born 1965)

Ashley C. Richardson
- Born: June 27, 1965 (age 59); Sudbury, Massachusetts, United States
- Height: 6 ft 1 in (185 cm)

Ashley C. Richardson (born June 27, 1965), sometimes credited as Ashley Montana, is an American former model. She appeared on the cover of Elle a total of seven times and on the cover of Cosmopolitan twice. She also appeared six times in the Sports Illustrated Swimsuit Issue (1989, 1990, 1991, 1992, 1993, and 1995). After appearing on the cover of the Sports Illustrated Swimsuit Issue in 1991, she was erroneously reported to be the wife of then NFL San Francisco 49ers quarterback Joe Montana, however she was married to New York nightclub owner Paul Montana. Her marriage ended in annulment in 1993, at which point Richardson went back to using her maiden name.

Richardson later had a brief relationship with model Brian Buzzini, resulting in a child, Daisy. After giving birth, she lost all of her pregnancy weight and subsequently appeared in the 1995 Sports Illustrated Swimsuit Issue. Richardson also had a brief relationship with John F. Kennedy Jr.

Among Richardson's commercial advertising appearances, she modeled many times for L'eggs Sheer Energy pantyhose in print on television commercials. In 1989 she appeared in John Mellencamp's "Let It All Hang Out" music video (the song appears on Mellencamp's Big Daddy album).

During the height of her career, she visited US military installations in a morale-boosting effort to support the American troops, including the San Diego Naval Submarine Base in 1991, when she visited the USS Haddock.
