= Marisa Miller =

American model (born 1978)

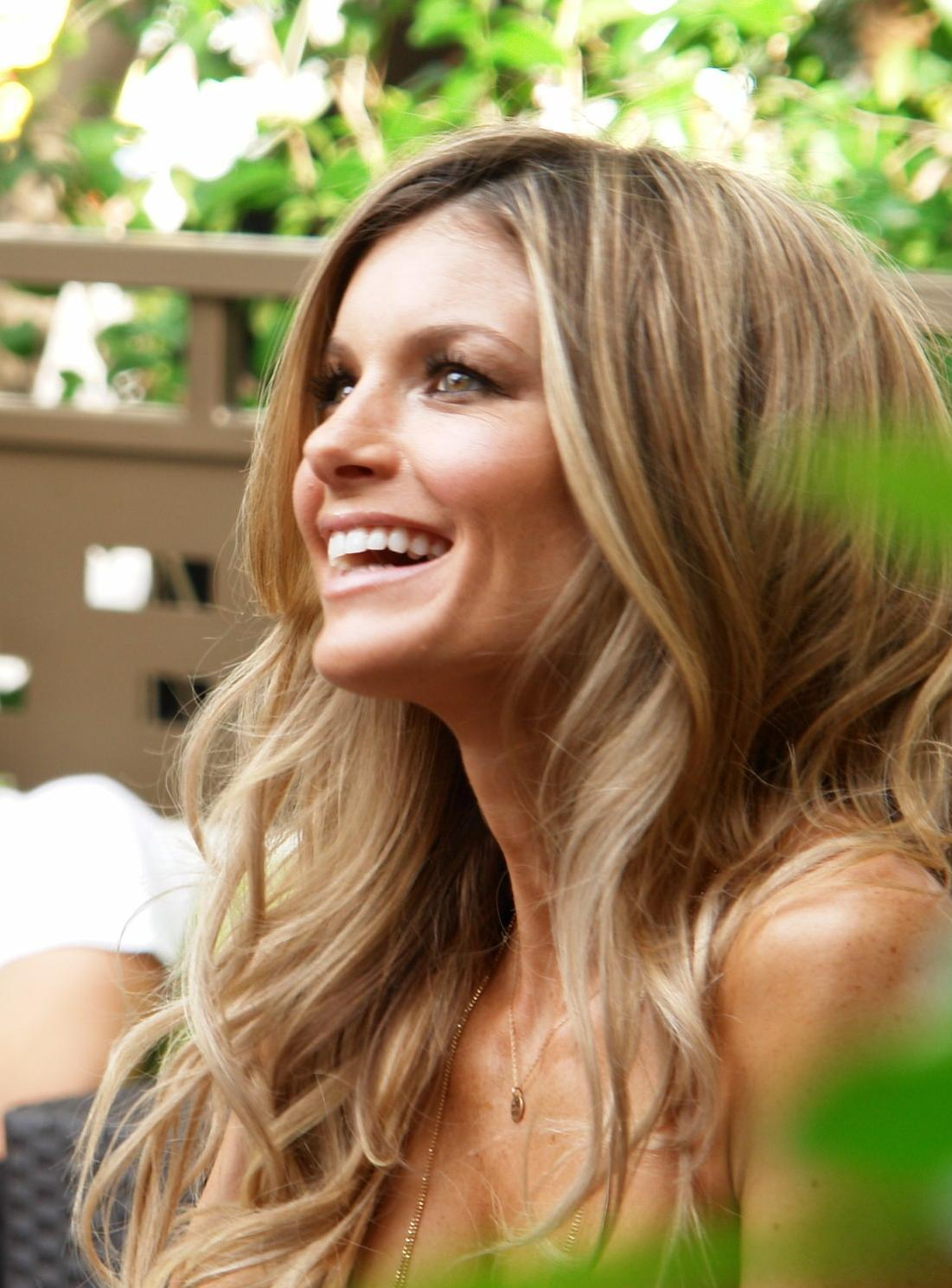
- Miller at The Mirage in Paradise, Nevada, on April 24, 2009
- Born: Marisa Lee Bertetta; August 6, 1978 (age 48); Santa Cruz, California, U.S
- Spouses: Jim Miller (m. 2000; div. 2002) Griffin Guess (m. 2006)
- Children: 2
- Modeling information
- Height: 5 ft 8 in (1.73 m)
- Hair color: Blonde
- Eye color: Hazel
- Agency: Excel Sports Management
- Website: marisamiller.com

Marisa Lee Miller (née Bertetta; born August 6, 1978) is an American model best known for her appearances in the Sports Illustrated Swimsuit Issue and her work for Victoria's Secret. After a stint shooting with photographer Mario Testino for fashion magazines such as Vogue, Miller began working for both companies in 2002. In 2007, she became a Victoria's Secret Angel, and appeared on the cover of the 2008 Sports Illustrated Swimsuit Issue to record-setting numbers. Her accomplishments have led to her being dubbed the "return of the great American supermodel."

She is known for contracts with companies such as Harley-Davidson, for whom she is the first spokesperson in the history of the company, and the NFL, for whom she became a spokesperson in 2010. Miller is considered a sex symbol; she ranked No. 1 on Maxim magazine's 2008 "Hot 100" list and in FHM's global 2010 "Sexiest Women in the World" poll. Aside from modeling, she was an ambassador for both the American Cancer Society and the USO. Miller made her film debut in R.I.P.D. (2013).

== Early life ==
Miller was born Marisa Lee Bertetta in Santa Cruz, California, to Krista (née Useldinger) and Marc Bertetta. She has two younger sisters. Miller attended high school at Aptos High and Monte Vista Christian School. She considered herself a tomboy growing up, with mostly male friends and little awareness of anything girly. Out of shyness, she often wore large t-shirts to hide her body and would get fully dressed just to go to the trash-can while at the beach.

Miller was first "discovered" at age sixteen walking through a San Francisco café by two Italian modeling agents. After talking to her mother, she was on a plane to Italy with her mother a few months later, despite her "shy and conservative" personality. During the 1990s, fashion modelling was going through a phase of the androgynous look, and Marisa thought herself too curvy and too short to fit that trend. Miller gained attention in 1997 when she appeared nude in the first issue of Perfect 10 magazine. Although she came in third behind Ashley Degenford and Monica Hansen in Perfect 10 magazine's first annual model search, she was repeatedly showcased in following issues, including the covers of the Winter 1998 and August/September 1999 editions, as well as a reprint for the Fall 2004 edition cover.

== Career ==
External image
- Miller's Sports Illustrated Swimsuit Issue cover from February 15, 2008

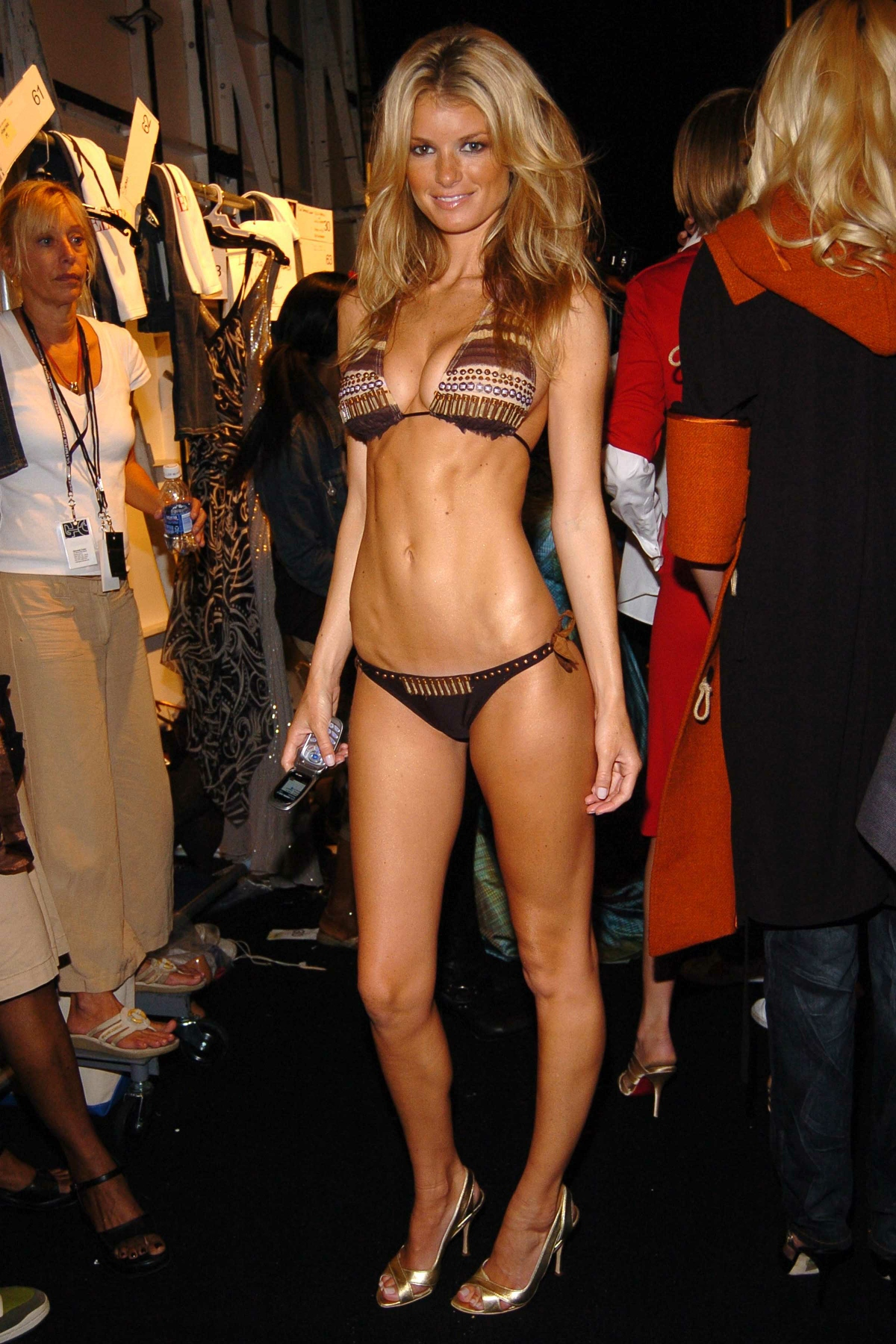
Miller backstage at the Fashion for Relief show in 2007, a charity event in aid of victims of Hurricane Katrina

In 2001 Miller moved from a start as an amateur magazine model to high-profile mainstream work, after being introduced to fashion photographer Mario Testino, leading to editorials for both the American and Italian editions of Vogue. By 2002 Miller was working for Victoria's Secret and appearing in the Sports Illustrated Swimsuit Issue, in which she appeared in every issue from 2002 to 2008. In particular, she famously posed wearing only an iPod in the 2007 issue. She has appeared in a diverse range of magazines, many of them international editions, such as GQ, Maxim, Glamour, Cosmopolitan, Marie Claire, Elle, and Vanity Fair. She has appeared in advertisements for Marc Jacobs, Tommy Hilfiger, Andrew Marc, Victoria's Secret, J.Crew, Guess?, Nordstrom, Bath & Body Works, and True Religion jeans.

It was not until 2007 that she filmed her first television commercial for Victoria's Secret, appearing alongside Heidi Klum for the It bra. On December 4, 2007, Miller made her debut in the Victoria's Secret Fashion Show, and opened a segment in the following year's edition. Other runway work include 2007's Fashion for Relief show, benefiting victims of Hurricane Katrina, as well as MTV's Fashionably Loud, Imitation of Christ, Inca, and Amir Slama's Rosa Cha, for which she was one of the most anticipated models. In the February 12, 2008, episode of the Late Show with David Letterman, it was revealed via a three-story billboard in New York City that Miller would occupy the cover of that year's Sports Illustrated Swimsuit Issue. The tandem online launch of the issue drew record page views to the SI website: 228 million, a 41% increase over 2007. In September 2008, Sports Illustrated released a "Best of Marisa Miller" swimsuit calendar for the 2009 year.

Victoria's Secret put her to work in 2008, with a five-city tour to promote the 2008 Swim collection's release in stores; the April–May tour included stops in New York City, Miami, Chicago (where she threw the opening pitch at a Chicago Cubs baseball game), Boston, and Minneapolis. The relaunch of Victoria's Secret sports line, VSX, soon followed, along with her first official campaign as an Angel: promoting the company's fragrance Very Sexy Dare. For the 2009 Victoria's Secret Fashion Show, Miller was chosen to wear the year's "Fantasy Bra", a harlequin design featuring 2,300 white, champagne, and cognac diamonds, and a 16-carat heart-shaped brown-yellow diamond pendant for a $3-million value and 150 total carats. In response to claims that Miller had parted with Victoria's Secret in January 2010, the Chief Marketing Officer for Limited Brands responded, saying the claims were "unfounded and untrue" while adding "we adore Marisa and we will continue to work with her in the future." In late 2010, Miller confirmed she had moved on to other projects.

=== Beyond modeling ===
In a July 2010 interview with Forbes, Miller explained her shift in focus from modelling to becoming a celebrity brand herself. For that reason, she moved to promoting consumer products in line with her own brand and personality. In July 2008, Miller launched a line of shoes she had developed with skateboarder/surfer-oriented company Vans . Miller starred in a 2008 viral video on YouTube with All Star baseball player Ryan Braun for Remington's ShortCut hair clippers.

In 2008, Miller became the first spokesperson in motorcycle manufacturer Harley-Davidson's one-hundred-year history. She first partnered with Harley to launch the VRSCF V-Rod Muscle motorcycle and rejoined the company in November 2009 to act as the face of their first "Military Appreciation Month" campaign, featuring Miller as a classic pin-up in military-themed advertisements and online content. 2010 found her again working for the company, this time for their "Start Something" campaign, encouraging dreamers to become new riders. Miller represented the rum brand Captain Morgan as the company's "Official First Mate" in advertising, social responsibility communication, and event appearances, starting in 2010.

In October 2010, the NFL announced Miller had been hired as a spokesperson for the 2010-2011 season, with duties including hosting the NFL International Series game between the San Francisco 49ers and Denver Broncos in London. The announcement drew accusations toward the league of sending a "mixed message" in hiring a well-known lingerie and swimsuit model on the heels of controversies over reporter Ines Sainz's treatment at the New York Jets' facilities and the messages and photos Brett Favre allegedly sent Jenn Sterger. New York Times columnist William C. Rhoden noted that "Miller reveals a lot of flesh in the N.F.L. advertisements featuring her. This is Miller's business, but it shouldn't be the N.F.L.'s." In 2010, she designed and released a paddle board line with Surftech aimed at female riders and in 2012 she appeared in a beach-theme commercial for Buick.

Miller's first work in television was as a judge on the Bravo reality series Manhunt: The Search for America's Most Gorgeous Male Model in 2004, the same year in July 2004 she appeared in the official music video for Puddle of Mudd's single titled "Spin You Around" from the band's album Life On Display. 2007 brought appearances in the pilot episode and finale of the VH1 reality show The Shot and cameos in HBO's Entourage and the CBS comedy How I Met Your Mother, the latter with her fellow Victoria's Secret Angels. In 2009, she had a guest judge role on an episode of America's Next Top Model and a minor role in an episode of Gary Unmarried; in 2010, she co-hosted an episode of GameTrailers TV with Geoff Keighley. She has appeared in commercials for the NFL Network and the California Travel and Tourism Commission's "Visit California" campaign. Miller's 2008 commercial for Activision's Guitar Hero: World Tour, was deemed too sexy to air. The advert was part of a campaign featuring various celebrities, and was based on the famous scene from Risky Business where Tom Cruise dances to Bob Seger's "Old Time Rock and Roll" in a shirt and underwear.

Miller's first film role was in R.I.P.D. (2013), with Ryan Reynolds and Jeff Bridges.

== Filmography ==
=== Film ===
Year	Title	Role	Director	Notes
2013	R.I.P.D.	Opal Pavlenko	Robert Schwentke	

=== Television ===
Year	Title	Role	Notes
2007	Entourage	Model	Episode: "The Prince's Bride"
2007	How I Met Your Mother	Marisa Miller	Episode: "The Yips"
2009	Gary Unmarried	Brittney	Episode: "Gary Keeps a Secret"

== Media recognition ==
The swell in publicity resulting from her 2008 work served to land Miller in the number one spot on Maxim magazine's "Hot 100" rankings for 2008, beating out list regulars such as Scarlett Johansson, Jessica Biel, and Eva Longoria. This marked the first time anyone has debuted on the list in the number one position. In her subsequent cover story for the July issue, Maxim proclaimed her as the "return of the great American supermodel." Of such acclaim, Miller admits, "I get a kick out of it, but it would be stupid to let it go to my head. It's modeling—I didn't find the cure for cancer." Miller continued to be highly rated and appeared on the list in 2009 in 18th place, and in 2010 in 10th place.

She also finished first place in The Best Damn Sports Show Period "Smokin' Sixteen" competition in 2008, repeating her 2007 win over competitors such as Gisele Bündchen and Adriana Lima. Miller ranked second in AskMen.com's "Top 99" for 2010, after ranking third in 2009, ninth in 2008, twelfth in 2007, and fourteenth in 2006. She added to her popular accolades with the "Hot N' Fresh" award at the second annual Spike Guys' Choice Awards.

In 2010, Miller came in third in FHM magazine's UK edition of the 16th annual "Sexiest Women in the World" poll, placing behind actress Megan Fox and winner, British singer Cheryl Cole. Miller topped the poll in the US edition of FHM and was declared the global winner of the poll, receiving the most combined votes from FHM's 24 international editions.

== Personal life ==
She married Jim Miller, a Los Angeles surfing contest promoter and lifeguard from California, in 2000. The couple separated in 2002; they divorced soon after. Following the divorce, Marisa continued using the surname Miller. She married music producer Griffin Guess on April 15, 2006. Miller gave birth to the couple's first child, a son, on December 13, 2012. She gave birth to the couple's second son on May 29, 2015.

From an early age she loved surfing, and her aunt was on the pro tour. In 2004, she placed second in the celebrity division of the Kelly Slater Surf Invitational and says of the sport, "I feel my absolute best—physically, mentally and spiritually—when I'm surfing every day." She also won the most valuable player award at the 4th annual Celebrity Beach Bowl. She was a standout volleyball player in high school and has taken up boxing. After signing with Harley-Davidson, Miller received her motorcycle license and rides a Harley Nightster. She has said that she would like to be a sportscaster. Miller comes from a family of nurses. Her mother returned to college to become a pediatrics nurse and her sisters are also nurses. She has expressed an interest in following the same career path if she stops modeling.

As of 2009, Miller is an ambassador for the American Cancer Society. Proceeds from her online store are donated to the charity. She also supports the Young Survival Coalition, which raises awareness of breast cancer in women under 40, as well as environmental organization the Surfrider Foundation, which aims to preserve the world's oceans and beaches. In 2014 she was honored with the inaugural Paul Walker Ocean Leadership Award. In October 2009, Miller hosted the Monte Foundation music festival, an annual fundraiser for schools in the Aptos area, where she and Guess own a home. She is also an ambassador for the USO; she visits military bases and receives frequent fan mail from American troops worldwide.

In May 2015, Miller posed while pregnant with her second child as part of a PETA campaign against SeaWorld's practice of separating baby orcas from their mothers.
