= Maria João (model) =

Brazilian former model (born 1955)

- Born: Maria João Sousa Leão; 12 February 1955 (age 71); Rio de Janeiro, Brazil
- Occupation: Former model
- Spouse: Alden Brewster
- Children: 2, including Jordana Brewster
- Modeling information
- Hair color: Brown
- Eye color: Brown

Maria João Brewster (née Sousa Leão; born 12 February 1955) is a Brazilian former model. She made a career as a photographic model in the 1970s; as of 2025, she holds the distinction of being the only Brazilian to appear on the cover of Sports Illustrated Swimsuit Issue, photographed in Bahia for the 1978 issue.

== Life and career ==
Before embarking on her modeling career, João studied communication at the Pontifical Catholic University of Rio de Janeiro.

She began her career through her friend, photographer Pedro Liborio, who sent her photos to the advertising agency DPZ. They placed her on the market of advertising and fashion, starting with an ad to Johnson & Johnson. Among others, she photographed for famous Brazilian magazines like Claudia and Nova and worked with renowned photographers of the country as such as José Antonio and Luis Tripoli.

== Personal life ==
João is married to Alden Brewster, an American partner of Banco Icatu. She is the mother of actress Jordana Brewster, with whom she starred in an advertising campaign in the United States in 2015, and lives in New York City with her family.
