= Adaora =

Nigerian-American model

Adaora Akubilo is a Nigerian-American model.

== Early life ==
Adaora was born in Windsor, CT and at the age of six she moved to her father’s home village in Nigeria. She spent approximately 10 years in Nigeria learning about their culture and their way of life. When she moved back to Connecticut she was approached by a model scout, Tina Kiniry, and her modeling career started.

== Career ==
In 2007, Akubilo appeared on NBC as one of the 12 finalists in the Sports Illustrated Swimsuit Model Search. In 2012, Adaora attended an interview with Sports Illustrated at her hometown modeling agency. She was accepted to appear on the show and went out to Los Angeles to shoot the Sports Illustrated TV show. She then went on to appear in the 2014 and 2015 Sports Illustrated Swimsuit Editions. Her career also includes campaigns for Covergirl, Garnier Nutrisse, House of Dereon, Ray Ban, Boden, Abercrombie, Mary Kay, Ulta, Burts Bees, and Avon.
