= Melissa Keller =

American model and actress (born 1979)

Melissa Keller (born 1979 in Long Lake, Minnesota) is an American model and actress.

Keller began her modeling career when she was 15 years old and has modeled for Parasuco, Noxzema, GAP, Revlon, L'Oréal, Aveda and for the Sports Illustrated Swimsuit Issue in 2002, 2003, and 2004. In addition to working with photographers on her Sports Illustrated shoots, she was the object/subject of Joanne Gair's body painting work. Sports Illustrated and Nissan previously held a sweepstakes allowing people to register for a chance to attend a sporting event with Keller.

Her film credits include Impact Point.

Keller also appears in the music video of George Michael's Outside.

Keller appeared as a guest chef on Paula Deen's show Paula's Best Dishes episode titled "Farmer's Market" on September 12, 2009.

Keller was a featured actress in the Budweiser Super Bowl commercial broadcast in February 2014.
