= Alicia Hall =

American model (born 1985)

Alicia Hall (born December 2, 1984) is an American model who won NBC's 2005 reality TV show Sports Illustrated Swimsuit Model Search.

== Career ==
In January 2003, Hall competed on CBS's revival of Star Search, making it as far as the semi-finals in the model category.

Hall again took the reality TV path when she was chosen from thousands of applicants to be one of the 12 finalists on series Sports Illustrated Swimsuit Model Search, which pitted aspiring models against one another in a six-episode modeling competition for a $1-million modeling contract with NEXT Model Management and a spread in Sports Illustrated's annual Swimsuit Issue. Hall made it to the final two, along with Shannon Hughes, and subsequently won.

She has since modeled for Skechers and is currently signed with Elite Model Management in Miami and Los Angeles, Chic Model Management in Australia, DCM Models in Seoul, Satoru Models in Japan, Major Model Management in Paris, and Race Model Management in New York.

She featured in the video of Egyptian singer Amr Diab's song "Wayah".
