= Veronika Vařeková =

Czech model (born 1977)

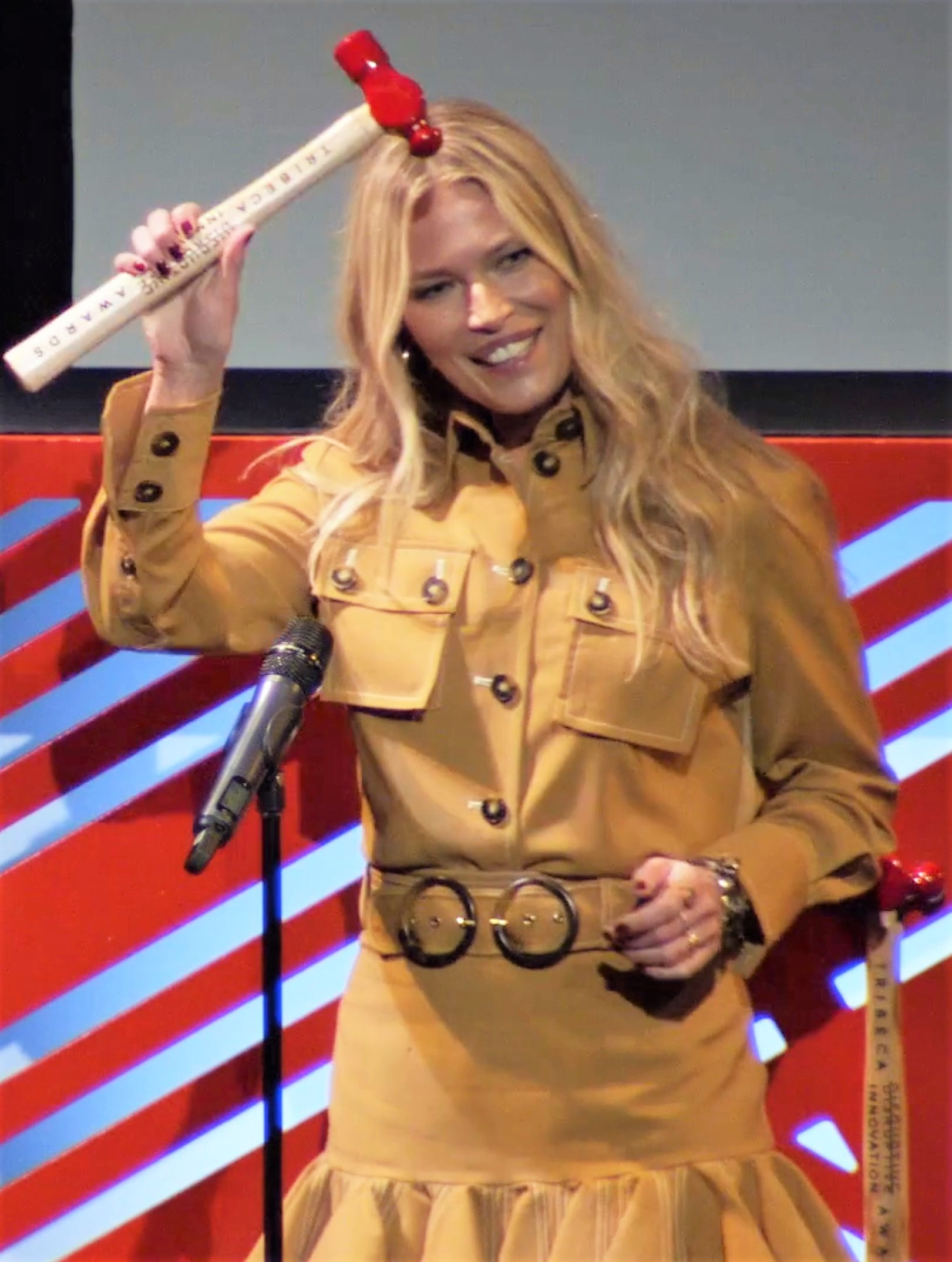
- Vařeková receiving 2019 Tribeca Disruptive Innovation award
- Born: Veronika Vařeková; 19 June 1977 (age 48); Olomouc, Czechoslovakia

Veronika Vařeková (born 19 June 1977) is a Czech model.

== Biography ==
A native of Olomouc, Czechoslovakia (now the Czech Republic), Vařeková moved to New York City at the age of 19 to attend the Parsons School of Design. Upon arriving in Manhattan, she met with Next Models, and was signed immediately.

External images
- Vařeková's Sports Illustrated Swimsuit Issue cover from 10 February 2004
- Vařeková's Sports Illustrated Swimsuit Issue cover from 17 February 2006

Vařeková appeared on the covers of several magazines, including the Sports Illustrated Swimsuit Issue. She took part in shoots by photographers including Patrick Demarchelier, Gilles Bensimon, Ellen Von Unsworth, Greg Kadel and Peter Lindbergh, and appeared in campaigns for Gap, Chanel, Guess, Nivea, Escada, Chopard, Pantene, Ungaro, Patek Philippe, Hublot, Victoria's Secret, and Newport News. She has also appeared on TV shows including The Tonight Show with Jay Leno, Jimmy Kimmel Live!, CNN, Charlie Rose, and Fox and Friends.

Vařeková has appeared in the swimsuit edition of Sports Illustrated a total of eight times: 1999-2002 and 2004–2007. She appeared on the cover in 2004. She has appeared on the cover of Marie Claire, Vogue, Harpers & Queen, Maxim, and Cosmopolitan.

== Personal life ==
In 2004, Vařeková married Petr Nedvěd, a Czech-Canadian ice-hockey player. Their marriage was short lived and the couple separated in 2006.

Vařeková climbed Mount Kilimanjaro in 2008. During this trip she met the African Wildlife Foundation team in Tanzania, and in October 2009 she became a Goodwill Ambassador for the organisation. She is also a patron volunteer at the SZPD Orphanage in her home town of Olomouc.

Veronica resides in New York City, but also spends time in Prague to be close to family and friends.
