= Babette March =

Cover model for Sports Illustrated

Babette March (born 1941), pronounced Marx, born Barbara Marchlowitz, formerly Babette Russell, or simply Babette, who is known by the name Babette Beatty, was the first Sports Illustrated Swimsuit Issue cover model. She was on the swimsuit issue cover of the January 20, 1964, issue, which has been credited with making the bikini a legitimate piece of clothing.

== Early life ==
According to Sports Illustrated, she was born in Berlin and raised in Brazil, Germany and Canada. According to her website, March was born in Berlin in 1941, moved to Rio de Janeiro 1949, traveled from 1959 to 1961, lived in Manhattan from 1961 to 1979, lived in Montreal from 1979 to 1986, resided in Palm Beach, Florida, and Naples, Italy, from 1986 to 1992, after which she moved to Halfway, Oregon.

== Modelling career ==
She started modelling in early 1962, beginning with a shoot for Weekend Magazine. By 1963 she was working for leading fashion magazines. She moved to a Park Avenue New York City apartment; eventually, she and her boyfriend settled in New York City.

According to a Sports Illustrated retrospective and other corroborating sources, in her prime, she was the "highest-paid model of her day" while working for Ford Models. In the mid-1960s, she was earning $85,000 a year. Eileen Ford describes March as the first elite photographic model that she recalls with gapped teeth. She was known for living the high life and for partying with the likes of Mick Jagger and Andy Warhol.

== After modelling ==
In 1976, she retired from modelling, then moved to a 54-acre (22 ha) farm outside Montreal where she raised pedigreed cattle, 40 sheep, 80 chickens and ducks, three horses, 14 dogs, and 18 cats. She then married Dale Beatty, an architect, and settled in Halfway, Oregon, where she and her husband opened a bakery, restaurant, and art gallery. She has become a highly regarded chef, according to Oregon Public Broadcasting. Her renovation, restoration and rejuvenation of the landmark bed & breakfast, art centre, bakery and restaurant was featured on a 30-minute Home & Garden Television channel show. Her art work has been featured on the label of a line of wines.
