= Yamila Diaz-Rahi =

Argentine model

- Born: March 9, 1976 (age 50); Buenos Aires, Argentina
- Modeling information
- Height: 1.70 m (5 ft 7 in)
- Hair color: Dark brown
- Eye color: Green
- Website: not currently hosted

Yamila Díaz-Rahi (born March 9, 1976), also Yamila Diaz, is an Argentine model. She has appeared in the Sports Illustrated Swimsuit Issue a total of 11 times (10 editorial issues), and made the cover of the magazine first in 2002 and again in 2006. She also featured in the 50th anniversary SI edition in 2014 titled "The Legends".

== Background ==
Díaz was born in Buenos Aires, Argentina. Her father is of Spanish and Lebanese descent and her mother, Spanish. Her father was a doctor and her mother was a health care manager. While studying Economics in Buenos Aires in 1996, she took a holiday in Uruguay where she was discovered by a scout from a Milan modeling agency.

== Modeling career ==
- Diaz-Rahi's Sports Illustrated Swimsuit Issue cover from February 17, 2006

After working in Milan for a few years, she was featured in 1999 in the Sports Illustrated Swimsuit Issue, and made the cover of the magazine first in 2002 and again in 2006. On the 2006 cover, she appears with several other models for an "All-Stars" special.

Diaz-Rahi has also appeared on the cover of numerous magazines such as GQ, Glamour, Maxim, Elle, Marie Claire, Harper's Bazaar, Shape. She has appeared in the Victoria's Secret catalog, and in advertisements for Bebe, Emanuel Ungaro's Fleur de Diva perfume, Replay Jeans, the Cool Water perfume by Davidoff and other products. In 2003 she appeared (billed under her own name) in a commercial for GE Profile appliances in which she met and married a (fictional) "professor of nanotechnology" to illustrate "the perfect marriage of beauty and brains" supposedly constituted by the appliances.

She was the first Latin spokesmodel in CoverGirl history. Diaz-Rahi also starred in the 1999 Italian film The Fish in Love.

== After modeling ==
Diaz-Rahi is now a pottery artist in New York City. She is featured in the short film 'Yamila Diaz Rahi: An Artist Life in Poetic Form' which won the award for best experimental film at the Cannes Shorts film festival in 2022.
