= Valeria Mazza =

Argentine model and businesswoman (born 1972)

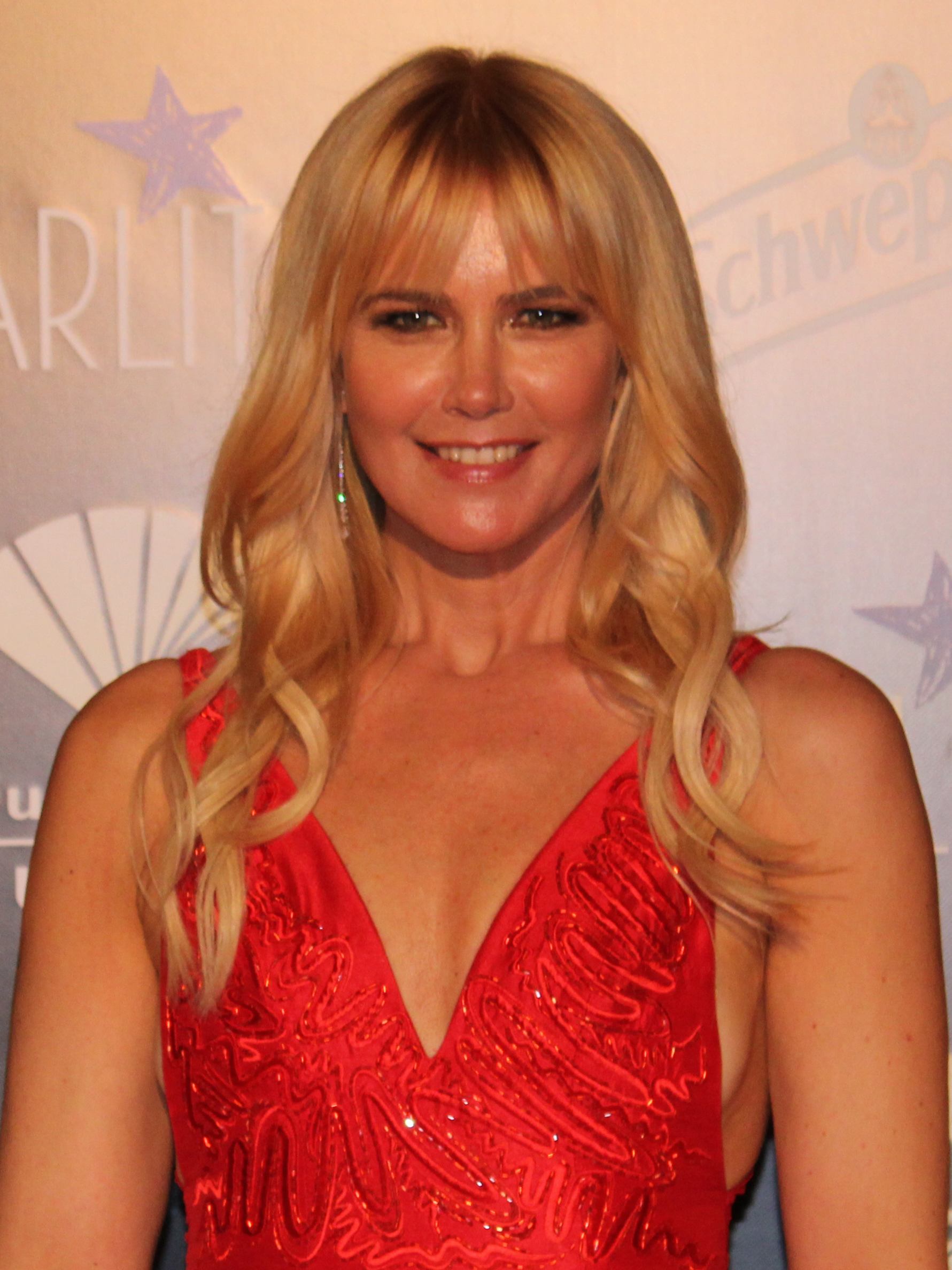
- Mazza at the Starlite Gala in 2019
- Born: Valeria Raquel Mazza; 17 February 1972 (age 54); Rosario, Santa Fe, Argentina
- Occupations: Model; businesswoman; philanthropist
- Years active: 1986–present
- Spouse: Alejandro Gravier (m. 1998)
- Children: 4
- Modeling information
- Height: 1.78 m (5 ft 10 in)
- Agency: New York Model Management (New York); d'management group (Milan); Munich Models (Munich)
- Website: valeriamazza.com.ar

Valeria Raquel Mazza (Spanish pronunciation: [baˈleɾja ˈmasa], Italian: [ˈmattsa]; born 17 February 1972) is an Argentine model and businesswoman. Mazza rose to prominence in the 1990s and became a household name after appearing on the cover of the Sports Illustrated Swimsuit Issue of 1996 and in the same year was one of the special co-hosters of Sanremo Music Festival 1996.

== Biography ==
Mazza was born in Rosario, Santa Fe Province, to Raúl Mariano Mazza Ceriani and Monica Ferreira, and was raised in Paraná, Entre Ríos Province. A model since age 14. In 1992, she moved to the United States, where, according to her official website, she consolidated her international career.

She gained international recognition after being chosen as the face of Guess in 1995. In 2004, she was invited to appear in the 40th anniversary special edition of the Sports Illustrated, posing alongside several models featured in the magazine’s history, including Christie Brinkley, Heidi Klum, Elle Macpherson, Cheryl Tiegs, Tyra Banks, Rachel Hunter, Stacey Williams, Paulina Porizkova, Vendela Kirsebom, and Roshumba Williams.

Throughout her career, she has walked for fashion houses including Versace, Armani, Gianfranco Ferré, Ralph Lauren, Donna Karan, Dolce & Gabbana, Dior, and Valentino.

During the peak of her career, Mazza was compared to German model Claudia Schiffer due to perceived physical similarities. In interviews, she stated that their relationship was marked by a competitive environment:

“It was widely known that when I started appearing, everyone compared us. There wasn’t much friendliness between us, as I wasn’t particularly to her liking… and I didn’t want to be anyone’s double. Over time, we ended up working together so often that she got used to seeing me, and we developed a good relationship. A few years ago, we met again, both sitting in the front row at a fashion show, and we now have a very good relationship.”

In 2023, the documentary Valeria Mazza: A Golden Dream was released on Paramount+, focusing on her career.

In the same year, Mazza appeared on the cover of the October issue of Vogue México and Latin America, photographed by Sebastián Faena. She had previously appeared in other editions of the magazine, including the Brazilian and Italian versions.

Mazza has also worked as an actress, presenter and brand ambassador. As a businesswoman, she has released three perfumes, her own magazine, and created an eyewear company and production company. Once a student of occupational therapy, she also promotes humanitarian causes, and is noted for her work with the Special Olympics, UNICEF, and the Pediatrics Unit of the Austral Hospital in Pilar, Buenos Aires Province.

Mazza remains a leading figure in Latin American fashion, and is considered the most important fashion model in Argentine history.

== Controversies ==
Mazza sparked controversy in an interview on the television programme Todas las tardes, where she shared her views on feminism. She supported equal opportunities for men and women, while stating that she believes there are differences between the genders. She said she supports the fight against inequality, although she does not agree that men and women should have exactly the same roles in society.

“I want to have the opportunity to do the same job as a man, with the same salary, but at the same time I love it when someone opens the car door for me. I don’t want to lose that.”

In the same interview, Mazza also spoke about aspects of her personal life. When asked about comments related to her appearance after motherhood, she confirmed, in a lighthearted manner, that her husband encouraged her to regain her physical shape after the birth of their children.

Her statements generated public debate, with mixed reactions in the media and on social media, including both criticism and support for her views.

In another interview, Valeria Mazza spoke about her personal experience with motherhood, stating that she considers raising sons to be simpler than raising a daughter. She also said that she did not specifically seek to have a daughter and initially wanted to have sons. These remarks sparked reactions, including criticism related to gender issues and stereotypes associated with raising children.

== Personal life ==
On 9 May 1998, Mazza married businessman Alejandro Gravier in the Basilica of the Blessed Sacrament in Retiro, Buenos Aires; the wedding reception was held at the Hipodromo Argentino de Palermo with 1,500 guests. They have four children; one of them, Tiziano Gravier, is a skier with a participation on Super-G at 2026 Winter Olympics on Italy. They live in Buenos Aires. They also own Finca Valeria, a countryside vacation property in La Barra, near Punta del Este, Uruguay.

In 2008, Mazza, her husband, and their accountant were prosecuted by Argentina's Revenue Service, Administración Federal de Ingresos Públicos, for alleged tax evasion of two million US dollars.

In 2015, Gravier and his parents pleaded guilty to additional charges of tax evasion, admitting to falsifying documents for the benefit of two companies whose majority shareholder is Mazza.
