= Sports Illustrated Swimsuit Issue =

American magazine published by Sports Illustrated

- The first swimsuit issue cover, released on January 20, 1964, featuring Babette March
- Editor: MJ Day
- Categories: Magazine
- Frequency: Yearly
- First issue: January 20, 1964
- Company: Sports Illustrated (Authentic Brands Group)
- Country: United States
- Language: English
- Website: swimsuit.si.com

The Sports Illustrated Swimsuit Issue is published annually by American magazine Sports Illustrated and features female fashion models, celebrities and athletes wearing swimwear in various locales around the world. The highly coveted cover photograph has been considered as the arbiter of supermodel succession. The issue carries advertising that, in 2005, amounted to US$35 million in value. First published in 1964, it is credited with making the bikini, invented in 1946, a legitimate piece of apparel.

Since 1964, the issue had been published every February, but starting in 2019, the issue was made available in May.

== History ==
The swimsuit issue was invented by Sports Illustrated editor Andre Laguerre to fill the winter months, a typically slow point in the sporting calendar. He asked fashion reporter Jule Campbell to go on a shoot to fill space, including the cover, with a beautiful model. The first issue, released in 1964, entailed a cover featuring Babette March and a five-page layout. Campbell soon became a powerful figure in modeling and molded the issue into a media phenomenon by featuring "bigger and healthier" California women and printing the names of the models with their photos, beginning a new supermodel era. In the 1950s, a few women appeared on the cover of Sports Illustrated, but the 1964 issue is considered to be the beginning of the current format known as the Swimsuit Issue. The issue that got the most letters was the 1978 edition.

When Mark Mulvoy became managing editor of Sports Illustrated, he doubled the size of the swimsuit issue from 20 to 40 pages, becoming a special annual issue The swimsuit issue sold five million copies annually during his time as managing editor, and profits for Sports Illustrated more than quadrupled.

In 1997, Tyra Banks was the first black woman on the cover. Since 1997, the swimsuit issue has been a stand-alone edition, separate from the regular weekly magazine. Its best selling issue was the 25th Anniversary Issue with Kathy Ireland on the cover in 1989.

Through the years, many models, such as Cheryl Tiegs, Christie Brinkley, Paulina Porizkova, Elle Macpherson, Kathy Ireland, Rachel Hunter, Rebecca Romijn, Petra Nemcova, Valeria Mazza, Heidi Klum, Tyra Banks, Marisa Miller, Brooks Nader, Irina Shayk, Brooklyn Decker, and Kate Upton have been featured on the cover. Other models within its pages, but not on its cover, include Cindy Crawford, Stephanie Seymour, Ella Halikas, Niki Taylor, Angie Everhart, and Naomi Campbell. The eight models featured on the cover of the 2006 issue were featured in a coffee-table book called Sports Illustrated: Exposure. Photographed by Raphael Mazzucco and produced by Diane Smith, the unprecedented "reunion shoot" featured 139 pages of previously-unpublished images. In 2006, the issue expanded publishing to handheld devices. In 2007, the swimsuit issue first became available in China.

The 2008–2013 covergirls were announced on Late Show with David Letterman. The 2014 and 2017 covergirls were announced on Jimmy Kimmel Live!. The 2015 cover model was announced on The Tonight Show Starring Jimmy Fallon. MJ Day became the issue's top editor in 2014.

The 2019 covers were exclusively announced on Good Morning America with Tyra Banks and Camille Kostek both appearing on the show on May 8, 2019. The 2019 issue leaned towards diversity and inclusivity with models representing different body types. It also tackled ageism, body image and the Me Too movement.

The 2020 issue was delayed due to the COVID-19 pandemic, and was released on July 13, 2020. Valentina Sampaio became the swimsuit issue's first openly transgender model in 2020. The first openly transgender covergirl for the magazine was Leyna Bloom in 2021.

In May 2022, Yumi Nu became the first plus-size model of Asian descent to be featured on the cover of the magazine. Also in May, Maye Musk became the oldest model to feature on the Swimsuit cover, appearing at 74 years old.

== Non-models in the magazine ==
Female athletes have appeared in swimsuit shoots. Steffi Graf appeared in 1997. In the 2003 issue, tennis player Serena Williams and figure skater Ekaterina Gordeeva were featured inside the magazine. In 2016, UFC fighter Ronda Rousey became the first female athlete to appear on the cover. However, Anna Kournikova appeared in an inset on the 2004 cover, and had a photo spread within its pages.

In 2005, Olympic gold medalists Amanda Beard and Jennie Finch, along with Lauren Jackson and Venus Williams, were featured. Maria Sharapova appeared in an inset on the 2006 cover and had a spread inside. In spring 2006, Sports Illustrated chose music as the theme for the 2007 issue. Swimsuit editor Diane Smith wanted Grammy-winner Beyoncé Knowles to pose. In 2006, Beyoncé launched a swimsuit line under her House of Deréon clothing label. Beyoncé Knowles became the first singer, and first non-model non-athlete, to appear on the cover in 2007.

In 2008, NFL cheerleaders appeared for the first time. Teams include the Tampa Bay Buccaneers, San Diego Chargers, Dallas Cowboys, Miami Dolphins, Philadelphia Eagles, Atlanta Falcons, Jacksonville Jaguars, New England Patriots, Oakland Raiders, Washington Commanders and Houston Texans.

Race car driver Danica Patrick appeared in 2008 and 2009. In 2008, she was featured in a four-page spread set in Singer Island, Florida.

For the 2010 issue, four female Winter Olympians appeared in swimsuits: Clair Bidez, Lacy Schnoor, Hannah Teter, and Lindsey Vonn. They were joined by tennis player Ana Ivanovic. Australian hurdler Michelle Jenneke appeared in the 2013 issue after having gained notoriety for her warm-up dance routine, which went viral on YouTube.

In 2012, Alex Morgan first appeared in a body paint swimsuit. In 2014, she made her second appearance this time in an actual swimsuit. In 2019, she appeared for her third appearance alongside her USWNT teammates; Megan Rapinoe, Crystal Dunn and Abby Dahlkemper all joined her in two-piece swimsuits.

Danish tennis player Caroline Wozniacki appeared in the 2015 issue. She is an active player, formerly world number one, and was photographed at Captiva Island in the Gulf of Mexico by Walter Iooss Jr. Top ranked Canadian tennis player Eugenie Bouchard appeared for the first time in the 2017 issue. She is an active player who has achieved a top five rank in tennis in 2014.

In 2021, Naomi Osaka became the first black athlete to appear not only inside but also on the cover of the SI swimsuit Issue.

In 2023, Martha Stewart, at the age of 81, became the oldest model on the cover of the SI swimsuit Issue. Also in 2023, Kim Petras became the second openly transgender woman to appear on the cover.

Olympic medalists Aly Raisman and Simone Biles both in appeared in the '17 edition, with Raisman repeating in '18, and Biles in the 2019 edition; Olivia Dunne, the NCAA gymnast, appeared in the '23 edition.

The 2024 60th Anniversary publication included reappearances by athletes Paige Spiranac, Sue Bird, Megan Rapinoe, Olivia Dunne, and Brenna Huckaby. Olympian rugby player Ilona Maher, collegiate diver Alexa Massari, collegiate softball player Jas Williams, and collegiate basketball player Jillian Hayes all made their debut in the issue as well.

== Reception ==
Bryan Curtis of Slate argued that the magazine is an acceptable exhibition of female sexuality not out of place on a coffee table. However, the swimsuit edition has proven controversial both with moralists who subscribe for sports news content as well as with those who feel that the focus on fashion and swimsuit modeling is inappropriate for a sports magazine. Feminists have expressed that "the Swimsuit Issue promotes the harmful and dehumanizing concept that women are a product for male consumption".

In 1997, sports sociologist Laurel R. Davis published The Swimsuit Issue and Sport: Hegemonic Masculinity in Sports Illustrated, examining the societal implications of the Sports Illustrated Swimsuit Issue. Davis analyzed editions of the magazine from its inception in 1964 through the 1990s and conducted interviews with producers and readers. Her research suggested that the swimsuit issues reinforced traditional gender roles and perpetuated a "climate of hegemonic masculinity." Davis also argued that the magazine marginalized people of color, non-heterosexual individuals, and residents of lower-income countries. Additionally, Davis critiqued the magazine's portrayal of models, suggesting it emphasized notions of femininity over athleticism by depicting them as dependent, emotionally vulnerable, and disconnected from the sporting context.

Despite the success of the swimsuit edition, hundreds have cancelled their subscriptions due to it. The 1978 edition, remembered for its fishnet bathing suit made famous by Cheryl Tiegs, resulted in 340 cancellations. Sports Illustrated makes the controversy a form of entertainment with the issue two weeks after the swimsuit edition packed with complainants such as shocked parents and troubled librarians. As of 2005, the number of cancellations has reportedly declined. Nonetheless, to avoid controversy, Sports Illustrated has, since 2007, offered its subscribers the option of skipping the swimsuit edition for a one issue credit to extend their subscription.

== Locations ==
The swimsuit issue was once predominantly shot in one country per year. As the issue has grown in size, the number of locations has also risen.

- 1964: Cozumel
- 1965: Baja California
- 1966: Bahamas
- 1967: Arizona
- 1968: French Polynesia
- 1969: Puerto Rico
- 1970: Hawaii
- 1971: Dominican Republic
- 1972: Marina del Rey
- 1973: Bahamas
- 1974: Puerto Rico
- 1975: Cancún
- 1976: Baja California
- 1977: Maui
- 1978: Brazil
- 1979: Seychelles
- 1980: British Virgin Islands
- 1981: Florida
- 1982: Kenya
- 1983: Jamaica
- 1984: Netherlands Antilles
- 1985: Australia
- 1986: French Polynesia
- 1987: Dominican Republic
- 1988: Thailand
- 1989: Mexico, Seychelles, Kenya, Lake Powell, Kauaʻi, St. Barts
- 1990: The Grenadines, Windward Islands
- 1991: Cruise theme – Turks & Caicos, Bali, St. Barts
- 1992: Spain
- 1993: Alaska, Florida Keys, Mackinac Island, Martha's Vineyard, Oahu
- 1994: Pool theme – Southern California, Colorado, Florida, Bali, Pantelleria, Sardinia, St. Maarten, Mexico, Hong Kong
- 1995: Bermuda, Costa Rica
- 1996: South Africa
- 1997: Bahamas, Monaco, Venezuela, Mexico, Malibu
- 1998: Equator theme – Maldives, Kenya, Indonesia, Galápagos Islands, Ecuador
- 1999: Necker Island, Guana Island
- 2000: Pacific theme – Malaysia, Oahu, Maui, Mexico
- 2001: Tunisia, Greece, Italy, Bahamas, Las Vegas
- 2002: Latin theme – Mexico, Guatemala, Costa Rica, Brazil, Argentina, Spanish Harlem
- 2003: Barbados, Kenya, Turkey, Florida Keys, Colorado, Vietnam, Grenada
- 2004: Montauk, New York, Saranac Lake, New York, Mississippi, Wyoming, Arizona, Bouton, Iowa, Perry, Iowa
- 2005: Exuma, Bahamas, Pico Bonito National Park, Honduras, Korčula, Croatia, Laguna Beach, California, Bora Bora, Portillo, Chile, Hua Hin, Thailand, Papgayo Peninsula, Costa Rica, Placencia, Belize, Fajardo, Puerto Rico
- 2006: Hollywood, Huahine, Las Vegas, Cartagena, Colombia, Cat Island and Harbour Island, Bahamas, Palm Springs
- 2007: Music theme – Memphis, Tennessee, Negril, Jamaica, Bahia, Brazil, Maui and Lahaina, Hawaii, Grambling and Shreveport, Louisiana, Los Angeles, Tucson, Arizona, Cleveland, Ohio
- 2008: St. Petersburg, Russia, Discovery Cove, Orlando and Singer Island, Florida, Saint John, U.S. Virgin Islands, Kaanapali, Hawaii, San Juan del Sur, Nicaragua, Seven Mile Beach, Cayman Islands, Turks & Caicos, Caesarea, Israel and the Dead Sea, Israel
- 2009: Riviera Maya, Yucatán Peninsula, Mexico, Teneriffa, Canary Islands, St. George's, Grenada, St. Vincent and the Grenadines, Naples, Italy, Cappadocia, Turkey, Cap Cana, Dominican Republic
- 2010: Whistler, Canada, Atacama, Chile, Rajasthan, India, Veligandu, Maldives, Palm Springs, California, Lisbon, Portugal
- 2011: Peter Island, British Virgin Islands, Nanuya Levu, Fiji, Boracay Island, The Philippines, Sentosa, Singapore, Maui, Hawaii, Laguna Beach, California, Banff National Park, Canada
- 2012: Bondi Beach, New South Wales and North Narrabeen, Australia, Apalachicola, Florida, Gulf Coast of the United States, Bocas del Toro Province and San Blas Islands, Panama, Desroches Island, Seychelles, Victoria Falls, Zambia
- 2013: Antarctica, Hayman Island, Australia, Guilin, China, Exuma, Bahamas, Easter Island, Chile, Etosha National Park and Swakopmund, Namibia, Seville, Spain
- 2014: Aitutaki, Cook Islands, Cape Canaveral, Florida, Lençóis Maranhenses National Park, Maranhão, Brazil, Zermatt and Lake Geneva, Switzerland, Nosy Be, Madagascar, Congress Hall, Cape May, New Jersey, St. Lucia, Fiji, Guana Island, British Virgin Islands
- 2015: American issue: West Coast California, Oregon, Washington; Blackberry Farm, Tennessee; Route 66 (Illinois, Kansas, Missouri, Oklahoma, Texas, New Mexico, Arizona); Parks - Monument Valley - Utah, Bryce Canyon - Utah, Yellowstone - Wyoming, Idaho, Montana, Jackson Hole, Wyoming; Kauaʻi, Hawaii; Caneel Bay, St. John, U.S. Virgin Islands; Captiva, Florida
- 2016: Bora Bora; Zanzibar, Tanzania; Providenciales, Turks and Caicos; Malta; Tahiti; Casa de Campo, Dominican Republic; Petit Saint Vincent, St. Vincent and the Grenadines; Exuma, Bahamas
- 2017: Fiji; Sumba, Indonesia; Tulum; Turks and Caicos; Saariselkä, Finland
- 2018: Tierra del Sol Resort & Golf, Aruba; Haute Harbour Island, Bahamas; Mahogany Bay Resort & Beach Club, Belize; Hermitage Plantation Inn, Nevis
- 2019: Costa Rica, Great Exuma, Kangaroo Island, Kenya, Paradise Island, Puerto Vallarta, St. Lucia

== In other media ==
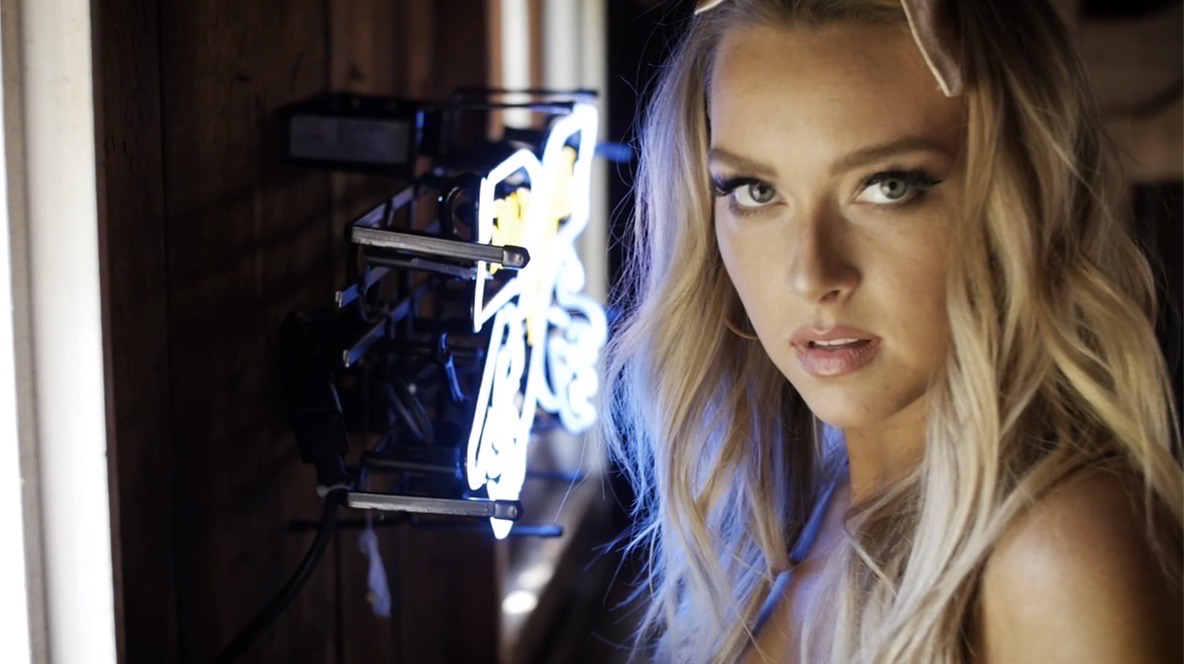
Camille Kostek won the first ever Sports Illustrated Swim Search in 2018, eventually landing a solo cover the following year.

- Beginning in the late 1980s, Sports Illustrated allowed television specials to be aired which were later released as video versions of its Swimsuit Issue. The first releases were available on VHS or LaserDisc (LD), and later releases have been available on DVD.
- In 1989, The Making of the Sports Illustrated 25th Anniversary Swimsuit Issue was a television documentary by HBO which later became available on VHS by Maysles Films.
- In 1992, a behind-the-scenes made-for-HBO special documentary was released on VHS as the Sports Illustrated Behind the Scenes: Official Swimsuit Video.
- In 1993, Sports Illustrated: The 1993 Swimsuit Video was released by HBO films.
- The Sports Illustrated 1994 Swimsuit Issue Video was released on video by Dakota North Entertainment. Since then, the annual video version of the Sports Illustrated Swimsuit Issue has been called the Swimsuit Video.
- In 1995, Sports Illustrated began distributing television specials based on the issue, titled Sports Illustrated Swimsuit Special. The hour-long specials have aired on Spike TV and TNT and Minisodes of several specials from 2002 to 2004 are available on Crackle.
- In 2004, the Sports Illustrated 40th Anniversary Swimsuit Special: American Beauty featured videos of the swimsuit beauties at various US locations, some of which are not usually thought of as beaches: e.g., the host Melissa Keller and Marisa Miller at the grain elevator in Bouton, Iowa, and on a farm near Perry, Iowa. The more recent videos have included some "uncensored" scenes.
- For January 2005, NBC produced the Sports Illustrated Swimsuit Model Search, a reality TV show documenting twelve previously unknown fashion models as they competed against one another over five weeks for the grand prize: a pictorial in the 2005 edition of the Swimsuit Issue and a modeling contract with NEXT Model Management worth one million US dollars. Alicia Hall won the competition.
- Prior to the release of the 2011 issue, DirecTV aired a preview special on the 101 Network, revealing the models in that year's edition. The show was hosted by Dan Patrick and Mallory Snyder.
- In 2017, the issue hosted its first ever open casting call where aspirants were asked to submit a 60-second video on Instagram. The three-part series Sports Illustrated Swim Search which documented the first ever open casting call with Camille Kostek as a winner (becoming a cover model in 2019) was made available on SI TV and Amazon Prime Video. The following year, the model search held an in-person open casting call in Miami, and has been held annually since.
- In 2019, the magazine held a two-day exhibition in Miami which gave "fans the chance to experience the world of SI Swim like never before through an array of one-of-a-kind installations, photo experiences," panels and talks among other things.

== See also ==
- List of Sports Illustrated Swimsuit Issue cover models
- List of Sports Illustrated Swimsuit Issue models
- The Body Issue
