= Body painting =

Form of art using the human body as the canvas

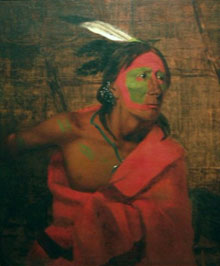
Indigenous American body painting

Body painting is a form of body art where artwork is painted directly onto the human skin. Unlike tattoos and other forms of body art, body painting is temporary, lasting several hours or sometimes up to a few weeks (in the case of mehndi or "henna tattoos" about two weeks). Body painting that is limited to the face is known as face painting. Body painting is also referred to as (a form of) "temporary tattoo". Large scale or full-body painting is more commonly referred to as body painting, while smaller or more detailed work can sometimes be referred to as temporary tattoos.

== Indigenous ==
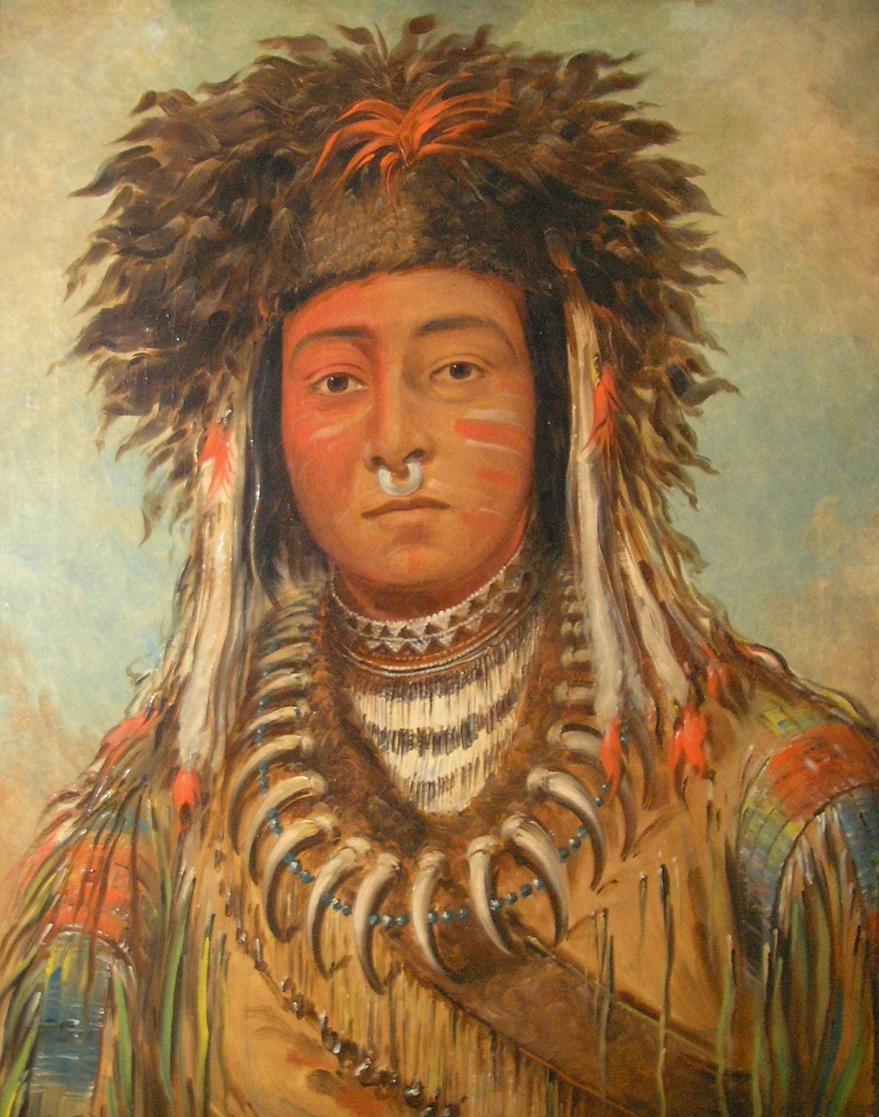
Indigenous body painting

Body painting with a grey or white paint made from natural pigments including clay, chalk, ash and cattle dung is traditional in many tribal cultures. Often worn during cultural ceremonies, it is believed to assist with the moderation of body heat and the use of striped patterns may reduce the incidence of biting insects. It still survives in this ancient form among Indigenous Australians and in parts of Africa and Southeast Asia, as well as in New Zealand and the Pacific islands. A semi-permanent form of body painting known as Mehndi, using dyes made of henna leaves (hence also known rather erroneously as "henna tattoo"), is practiced in India, especially on brides. Since the late 1990s, Mehndi has become popular amongst young women in the Western world.

Many indigenous peoples of Central and South America paint jagua tattoos, or designs with Genipa americana juice on their bodies. Indigenous peoples of South America traditionally use annatto, huito, or wet charcoal to decorate their faces and bodies. Huito is semi-permanent, and it generally takes weeks for this black dye to fade.

== Western ==
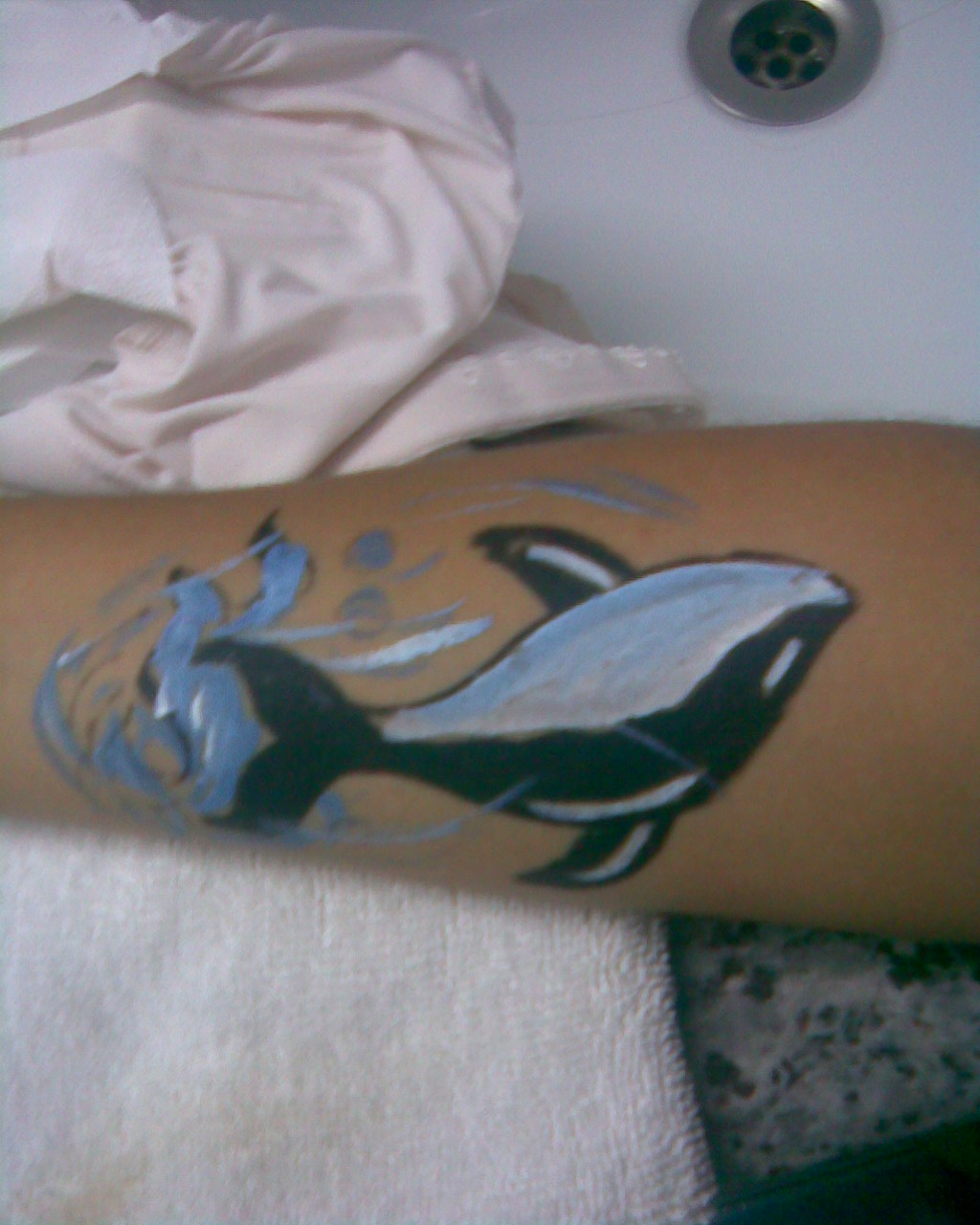
A painted orca design on a forearm

Body painting is not always large pieces on fully nude bodies, but can involve smaller pieces on displayed areas of otherwise clothed bodies. There has been a revival of body painting in Western society since the 1960s, in part prompted by the liberalization of social mores regarding nudity and often comes in sensationalist or exhibitionist forms. Even today there is a constant debate about the legitimacy of body painting as an art form. The current modern revival could be said to date back to the 1933 World's Fair in Chicago when Max Factor Sr. and his model Sally Rand were arrested for causing a public disturbance when he body-painted her with his new make-up formulated for Hollywood films. Body art today evolves to the works more directed towards personal mythologies, as Jana Sterbak, Rebecca Horn, Michel Platnic, Youri Messen-Jaschin or Javier Perez.

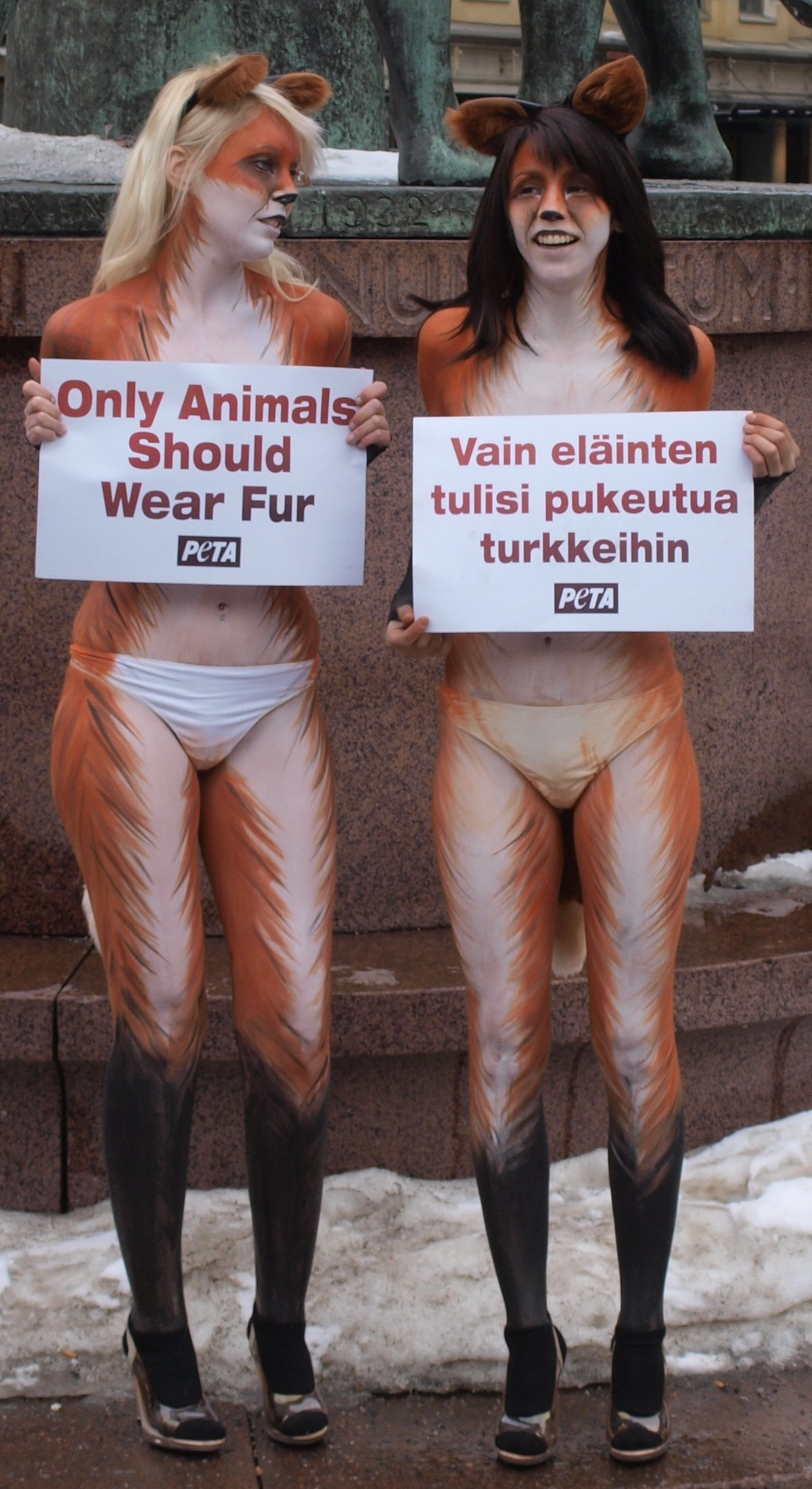
Body-painted women in a PETA protest against fur

Body painting is sometimes used as a method of gaining attention in political protests, for instance those by PETA against Burberry.

Joanne Gair is a body paint artist whose work appeared for the tenth consecutive year in the 2008 Sports Illustrated Swimsuit Issue. She came to prominence with an August 1992 Vanity Fair Demi's Birthday Suit cover of Demi Moore. Her Disappearing Model was part of an episode of Ripley's Believe It or Not!.

=== Festivals ===
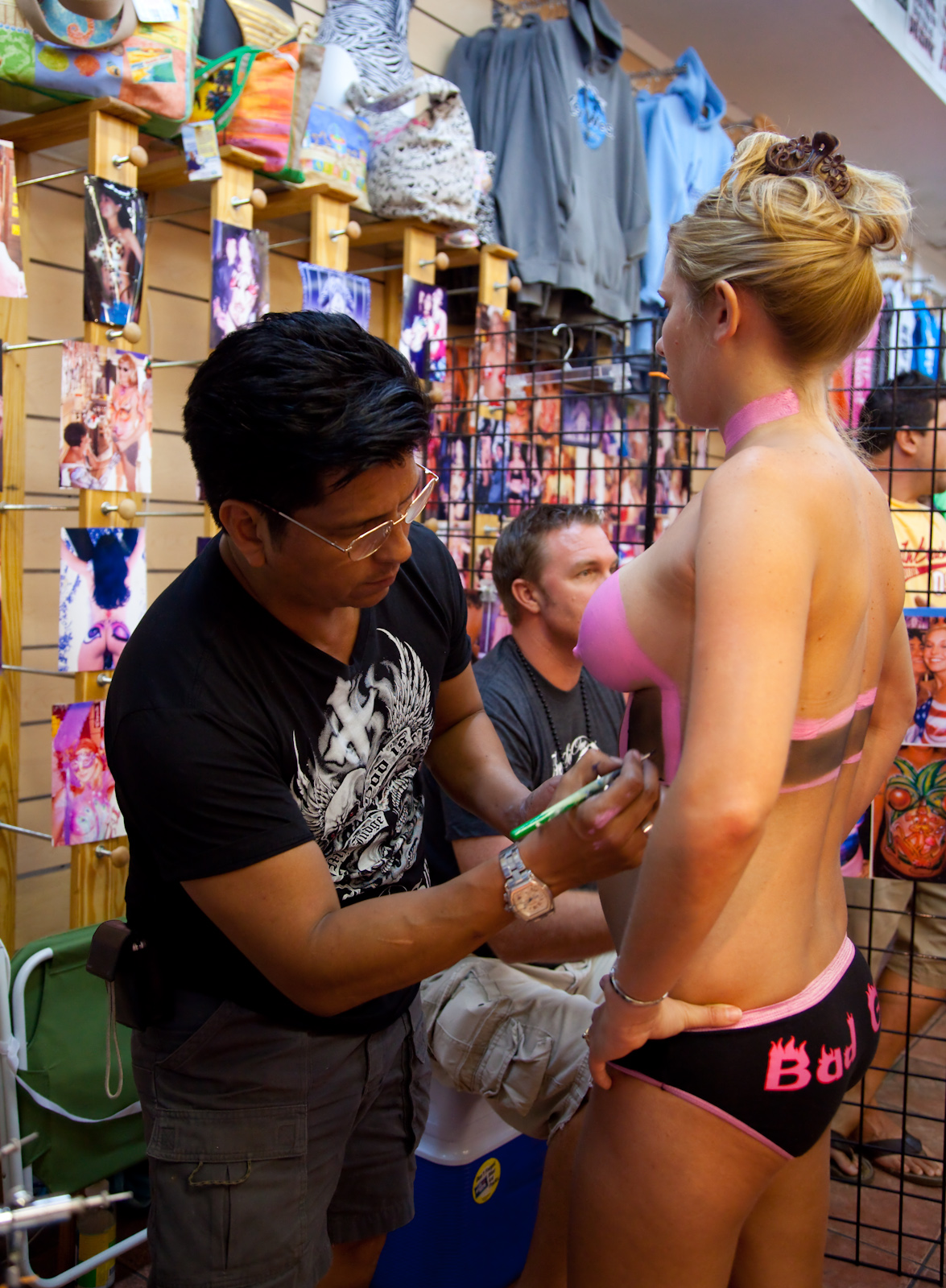
An artist body painting at Fantasy Fest

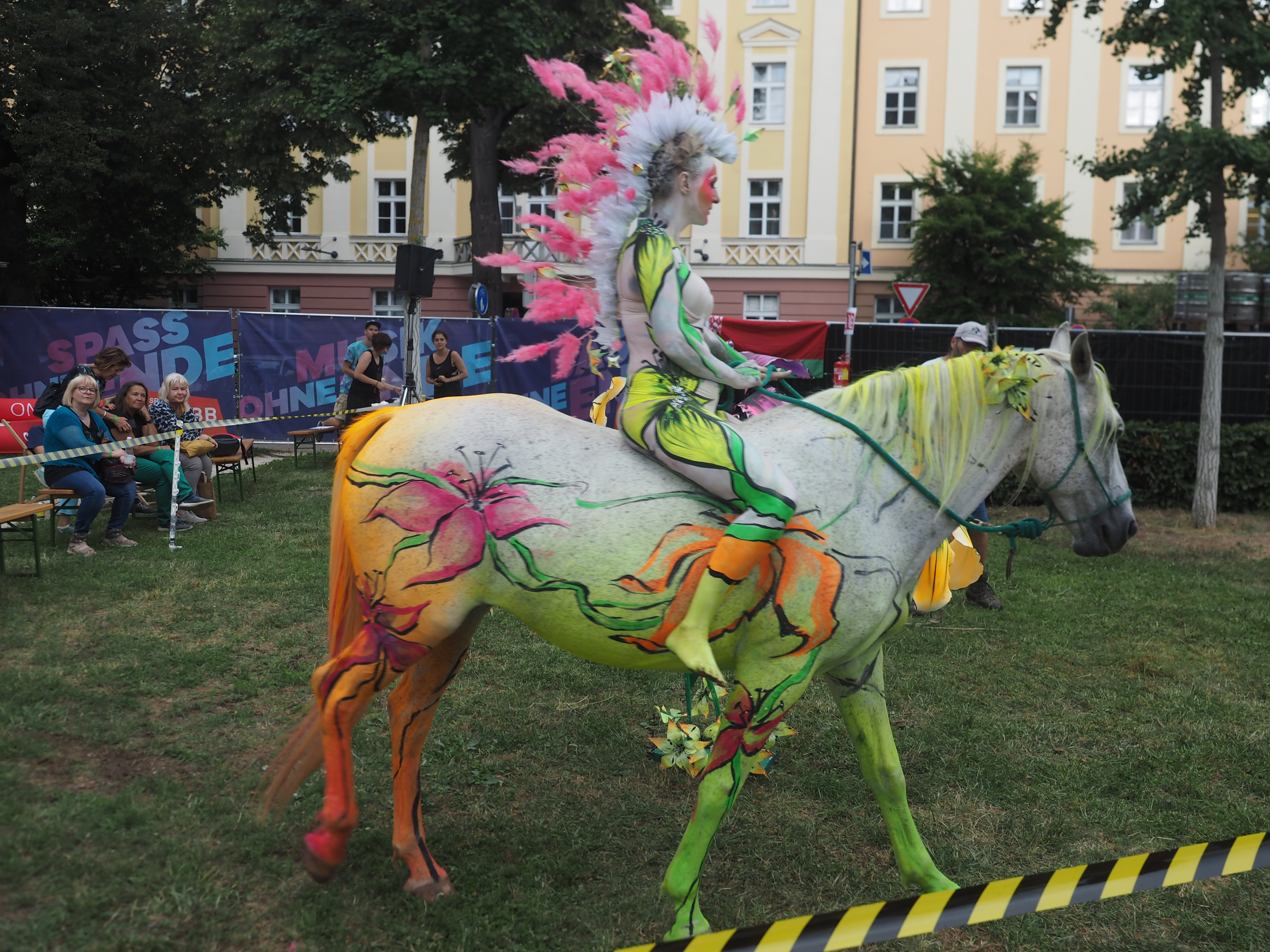
Body painting is not always limited to humans.

Body painting festivals happen annually across the world, bringing together professional body painters and keen amateurs. Body painting can also be seen at some football matches, at rave parties, and at certain festivals. The World Bodypainting Festival is a three-day festival which originated in 1998 and which has been held in Klagenfurt, Austria since 2017; the associated World Bodypainting Association promotes the art of bodypainting.

Body painting festivals that take place in North America include the North American Body Painting Championship, Face and Body Art International Convention in Orlando, Florida, Bodygras Body Painting Competition in Nanaimo, BC and the Face Painting and Body Art Convention in Las Vegas, Nevada.

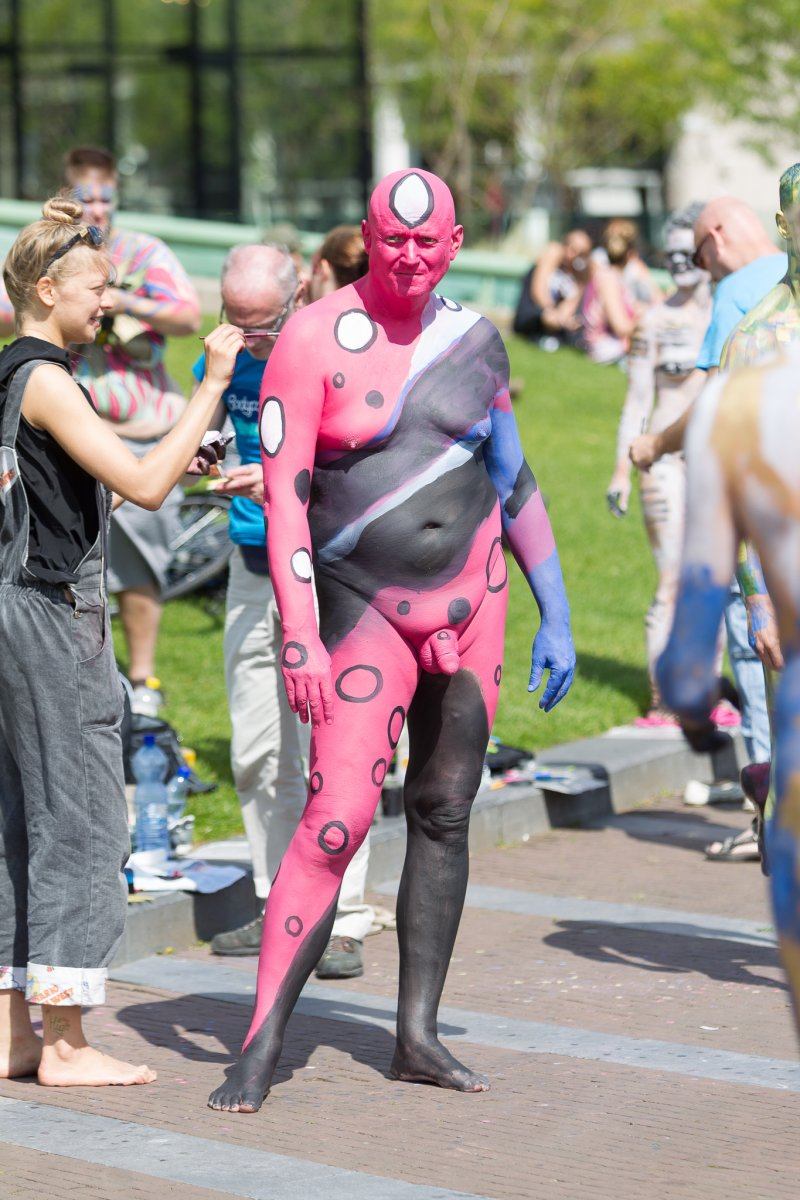
Body painting of a male nude model in Amsterdam 2016

Australia also has a number of body painting festivals, most notably the annual Australian Body Art Festival in Eumundi, Queensland and the Australian Body Art Awards.

In Italy, the Rabarama Skin Art Festival is an event focused on the artistic side of body painting, highlighting the emotional impact of the painted body in a live performance. This form of body painting is known as "Skin Art".

=== Fine art ===
The 1960s supermodel Veruschka has inspired bodypaint artists, after influential images of her appeared in the 1986 book Transfigurations by photographer Holger Trulzsch. Other well-known works include Serge Diakonoff's books A Fleur de Peau and Diakonoff and Joanne Gair's Paint a licious. More recently Dutch art photographer Karl Hammer has created combinations of body painting and narrative art (fantastic realism).

Following the already established trend in Western Europe, body painting has become more widely accepted in the United States since the early 1990s. In 2006 the first gallery dedicated exclusively to fine art body painting was opened in New Orleans by World Bodypainting Festival Champion and Judge, Craig Tracy. The Painted Alive Gallery is on Royal Street in the French Quarter. In 2009, the late-night talk show Last Call with Carson Daly featured the New York-based artist Danny Setiawan who creates reproductions of masterpieces by famous artists such as Salvador Dalí, Vincent van Gogh, and Gustav Klimt on human bodies.

Since 2005 the Australian visual artist Emma Hack has been creating photographs of painted naked human bodies that visually merge with a patterned background wall inspired by the wallpaper designs of Florence Broadhurst. Hack is best known for the Gotye music video for the song "Somebody That I Used to Know", which uses stop-motion animation body painting and has received over 800 million views on YouTube.

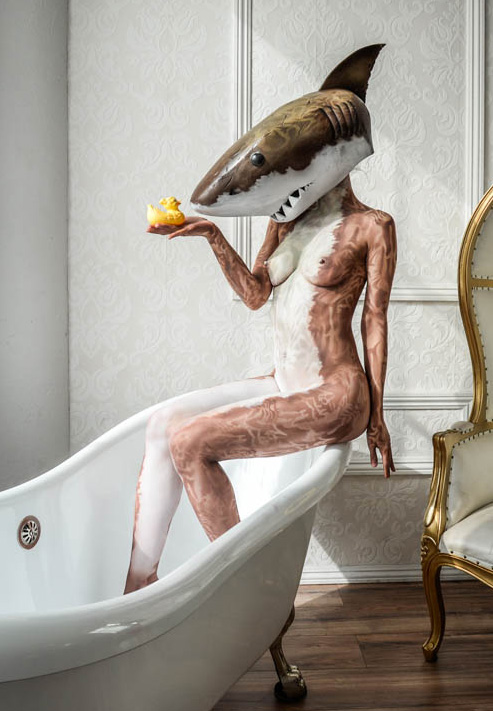
Body painting artwork from the series Sharks Are People Too! by Paul Roustan

Michel Platnic is a French–Israeli contemporary visual artist known for his "living paintings". He uses multiple mediums including photography, video, performance body-painting and painting. Platnic builds three-dimensional cinema sets for his video and photography work and then paints the bodies of living models he places within the sets. Using this technique, Platnic brought to life several scenes of paintings made famous by artists Francis Bacon, Egon Schiele, David Hockney and Lucian Freud and placed them in a different context. Los Angeles artist, Paul Roustan, is known for his work in body painting and photography which spans both the fine art and commercial worlds. His body painting has received numerous awards, including winner of the North American Body Paint Championships.

Trina Merry is a body painter known for camouflaging models into settings, backgrounds and, in her "Lust of Currency" series, famous paintings. Merry's collection was exhibited during Miami Art Basel in 2017 and at the Superfine! New York art fair in May 2018.

Peruvian artist Cecilia Paredes is known for her style of painting her own body to camouflage herself against complex floral backgrounds and natural landscapes.

=== In the commercial arena ===
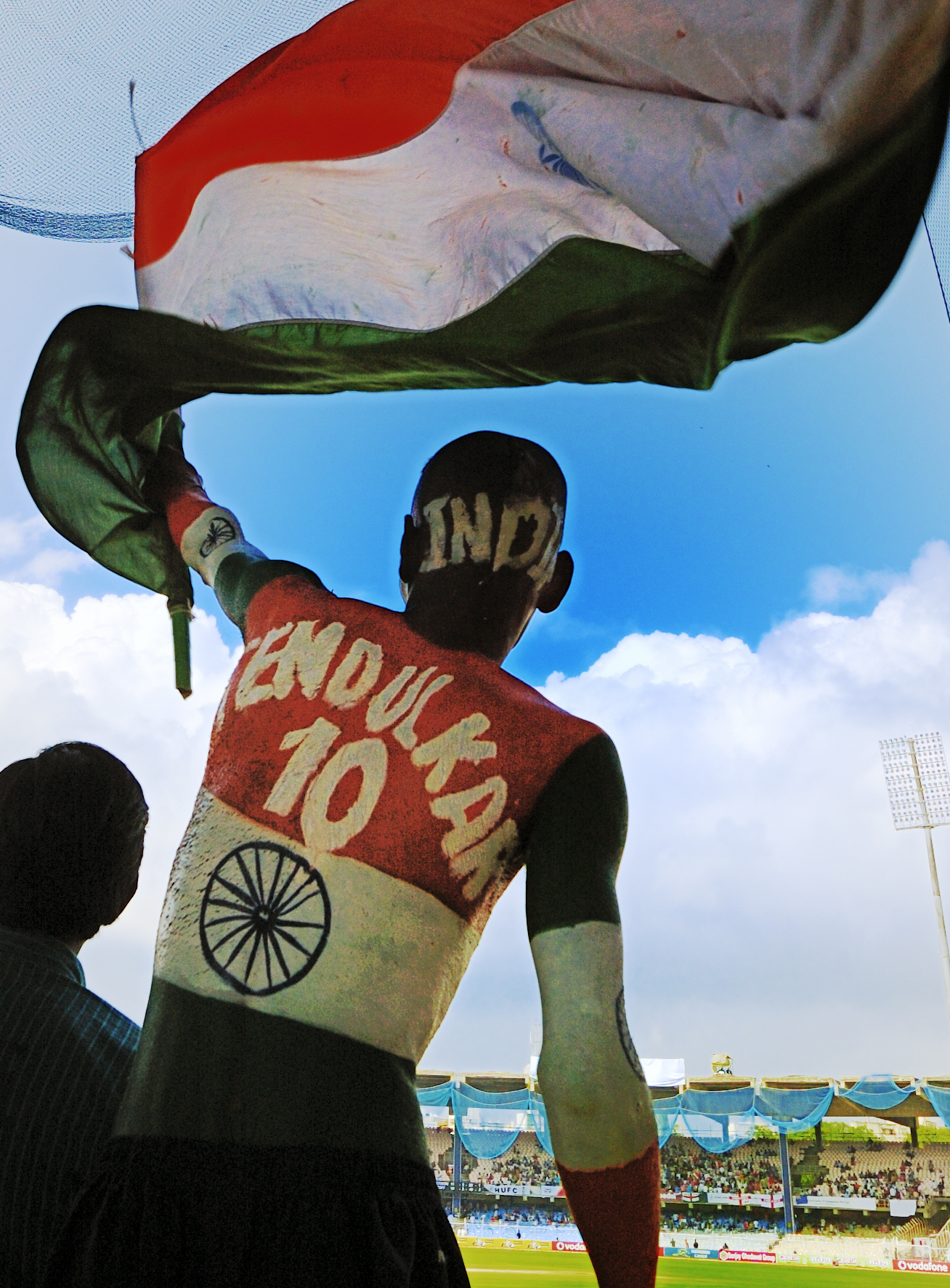
Sudhir Kumar Chaudhary, a fan of the Indian cricket team, travels to all Indian home games with his body painted as the Indian flag, along with the number of his idol Sachin Tendulkar

Professional artists are employed as body painters for television commercials. For example, models were painted to look like trees as part of a TV advertising campaign for Natrel Plus. Still photography of body painting is also used in print advertising, with hundreds of images of body painting appearing in magazines every year. Body painters also frequently work in the film industry, especially in science fiction, with body painting used to create elaborate alien designs.

The Sports Illustrated Swimsuit Issue, published annually, has frequently featured a section in which body-painted models appear to be wearing swimsuits or sports jerseys. Playboy magazine has frequently made use of body painted models. In the 2005 Playmates at Play at the Playboy Mansion calendar, all the Playmates appeared in bikinis apart from Playmates Karen McDougal and Hiromi Oshima, who instead had painted-on bikinis.

The success of body painting has led to many notable international competitions and a specific trade magazine (Illusion Magazine) for this industry, showcasing work around the world.

== Face painting ==
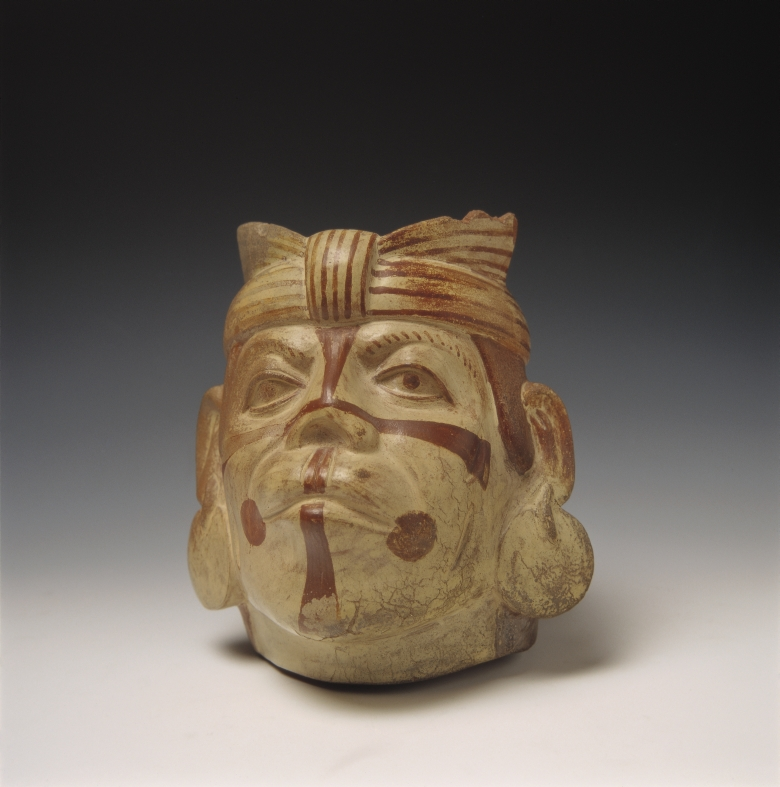
Moche ceramic vessel at the Larco Museum in Lima, depicting a man, possibly a warrior, with face painting

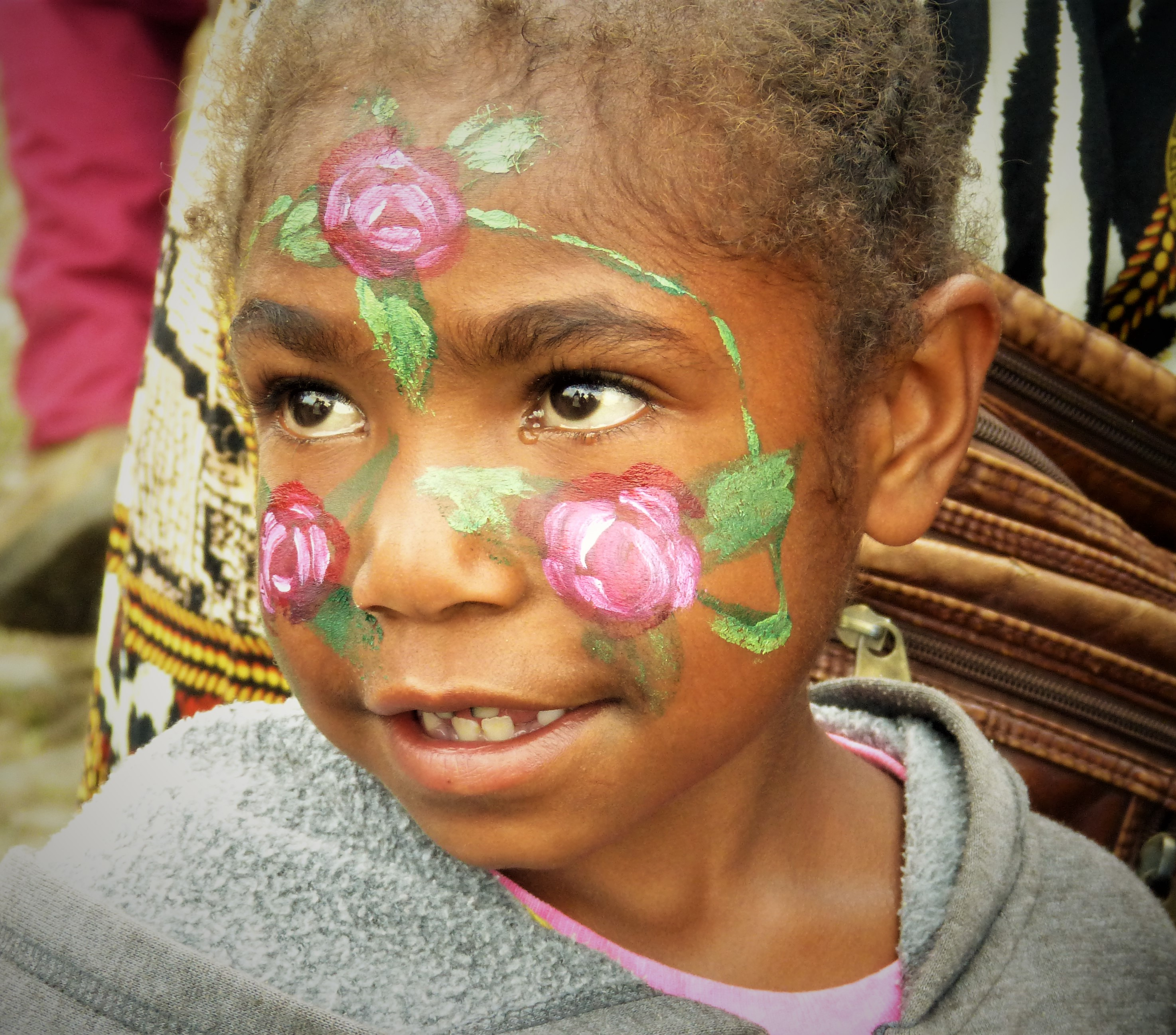
A child wearing face paint

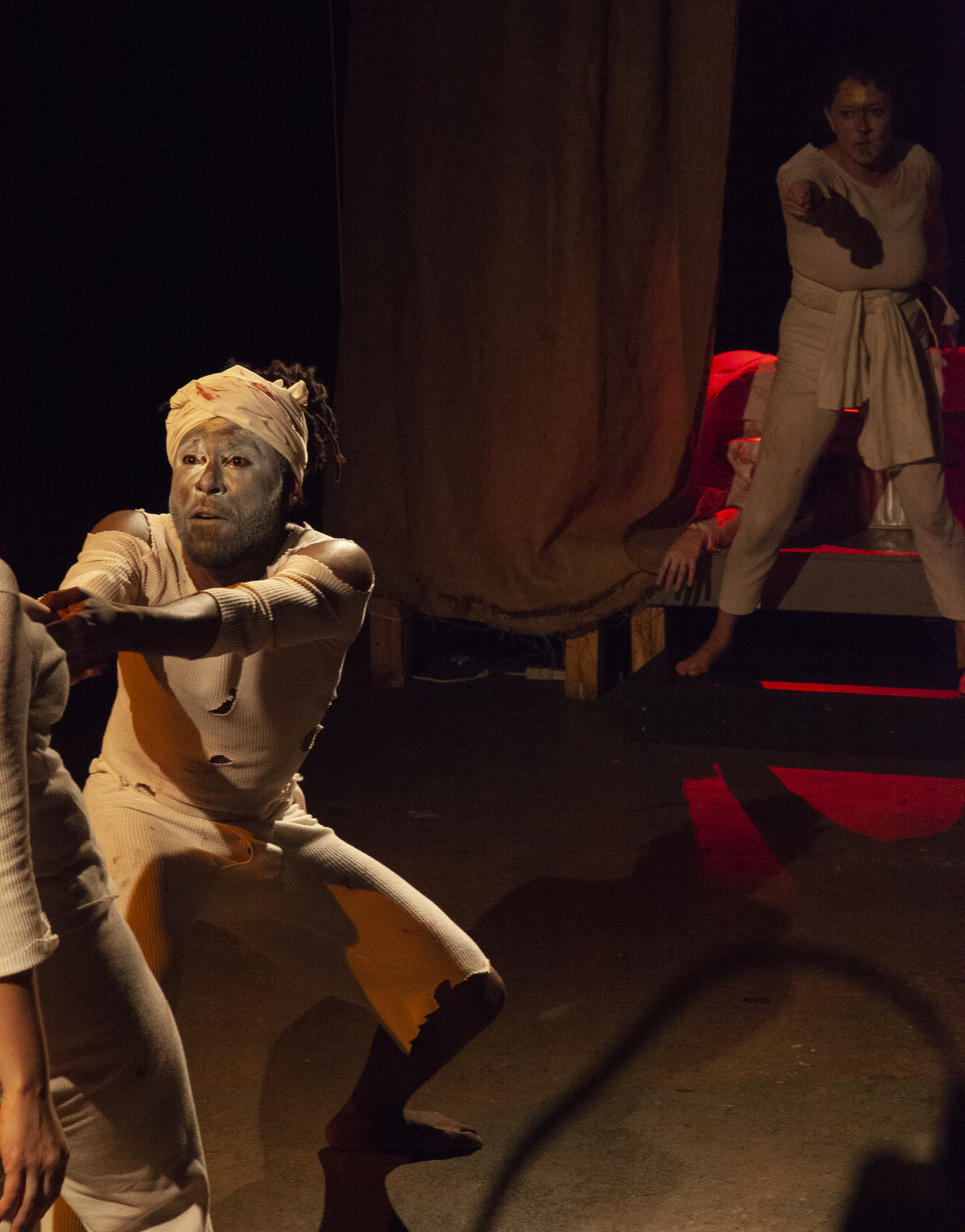
Marcus Stewart with his face painted as he acts in Oresteia by Aeschylus, adapted by Ryan Castalia for Stairwell Theater, 2019

Face painting is the artistic application of nontoxic paint to a person's face. The practice dates from Paleolithic times and has been used for ritual purposes, such as coming-of-age ceremonies and funeral rites, as well as for hunting. Materials such as clay, chalk or henna have been used, typically mixed with pigments extracted from leaves, fruits or berries and sometimes with oils or fats.

Many peoples around the world practice face painting in modern times. This includes indigenous peoples in places such as Australia, Papua New Guinea, Polynesia and Melanesia. Some tribes in Sub-Saharan Africa use the technique during rituals and festivals, and many of the indigenous peoples of the Pacific Northwest Coast of North America now use it for ceremonies, having previously also used it for hunting and warfare. In India it is used in folk dances and temple festivals, such as in Kathakali performances, and Mehndi designs are used at weddings. It is also used by Japanese Geisha and Chinese opera singers. Women in Madagascar paint their faces with designs featuring stars, flowers and leaves using contrasting yellow and white wood paste called masonjoany.

In some forms of Western folk dance, such as Border Morris, the faces of the dancers are painted with a black pigment in a tradition that goes back to the Middle Ages. In the 18th century cosmetic face painting became popular with men and women of the aristocracy and the nouveau riche, but it died out in Western culture after the fall of the French aristocracy. During the 19th century blackface theatrical makeup gained popularity when it was used by non-black performers to represent black people, typically in a minstrel show. Its use ended in the United States with the Civil Rights Movement of the 1960s. At about the same time the hippie movement adopted face painting, and it was common for young people to decorate their cheeks with flowers or peace symbols at anti-war demonstrations.

Skeletal face painting has become common at Day of the Dead celebrations in Mexico and in the United States, especially since the 2010s.

In contemporary Western culture face painting has become an art form, with artists displaying their work at festivals and in competitions and magazines. Other western users include actors and clowns, and it continues to be used as a form of camouflage amongst hunters and the military. It is also found at entertainments for children and sports events.

=== In the military ===
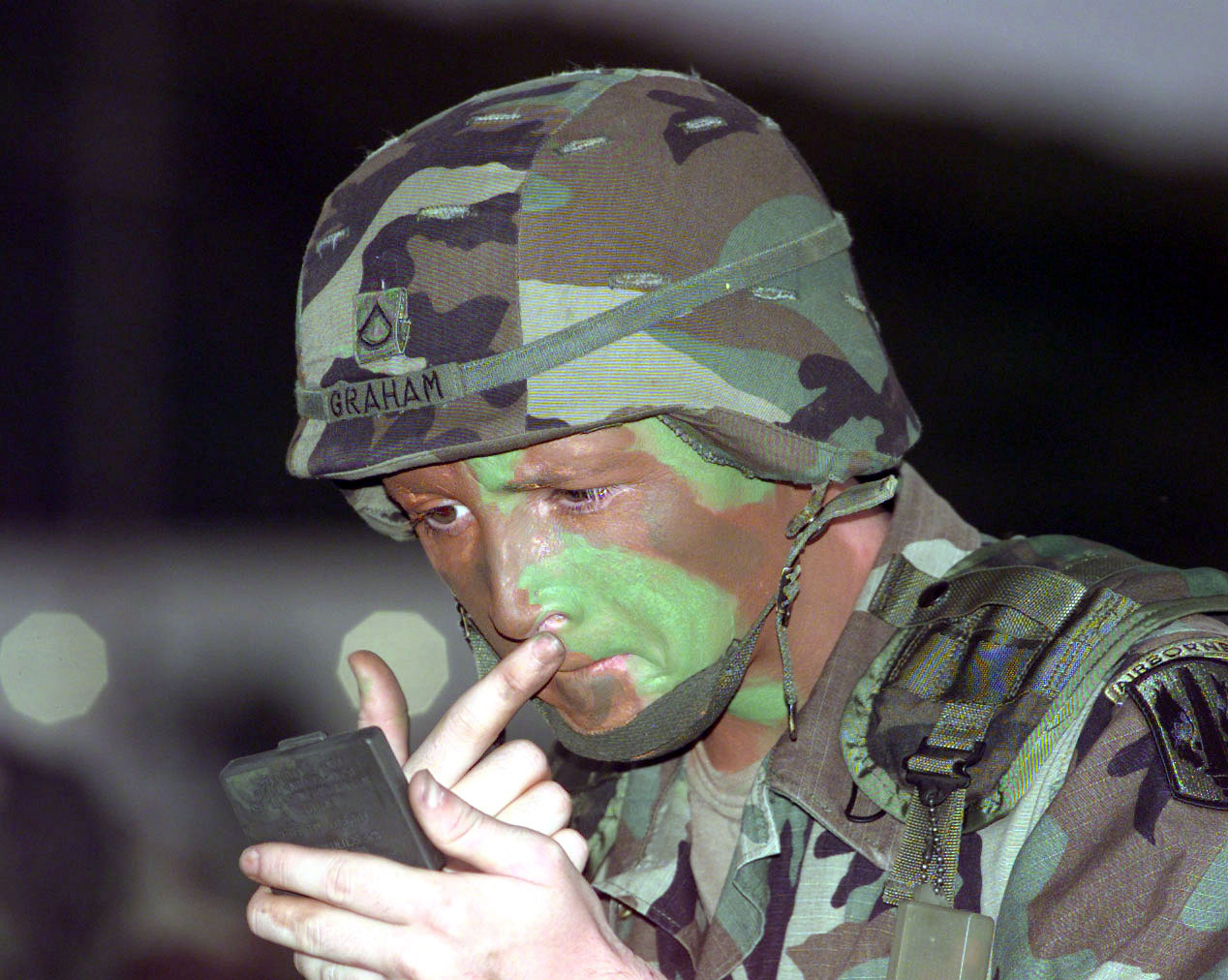
A soldier applies face paints as military camouflage.

It is common for soldiers in combat to paint their faces and other exposed body parts in colors such as green, tan, and loam as camouflage. In various South American armies, it is a tradition to use face paint on parade in respect to the indigenous tribes.

== Temporary tattoos ==
As well as paint, temporary tattoos can be used to decorate the body. "Glitter tattoos" are made by applying a clear, cosmetic-grade glue (either freehand or through a stencil) on the skin and then coating it with cosmetic-grade glitter. They can last up to a week depending on the model's body chemistry.

Foil metallic temporary tattoos are a variation of decal-style temporary tattoos, printed using foil stamping technique instead of ink. On the front side, the foil design is printed as a mirror image in order to be viewed in the right direction once it is applied to the skin. Each metallic tattoo is protected by a transparent protective film.

== Body paints ==
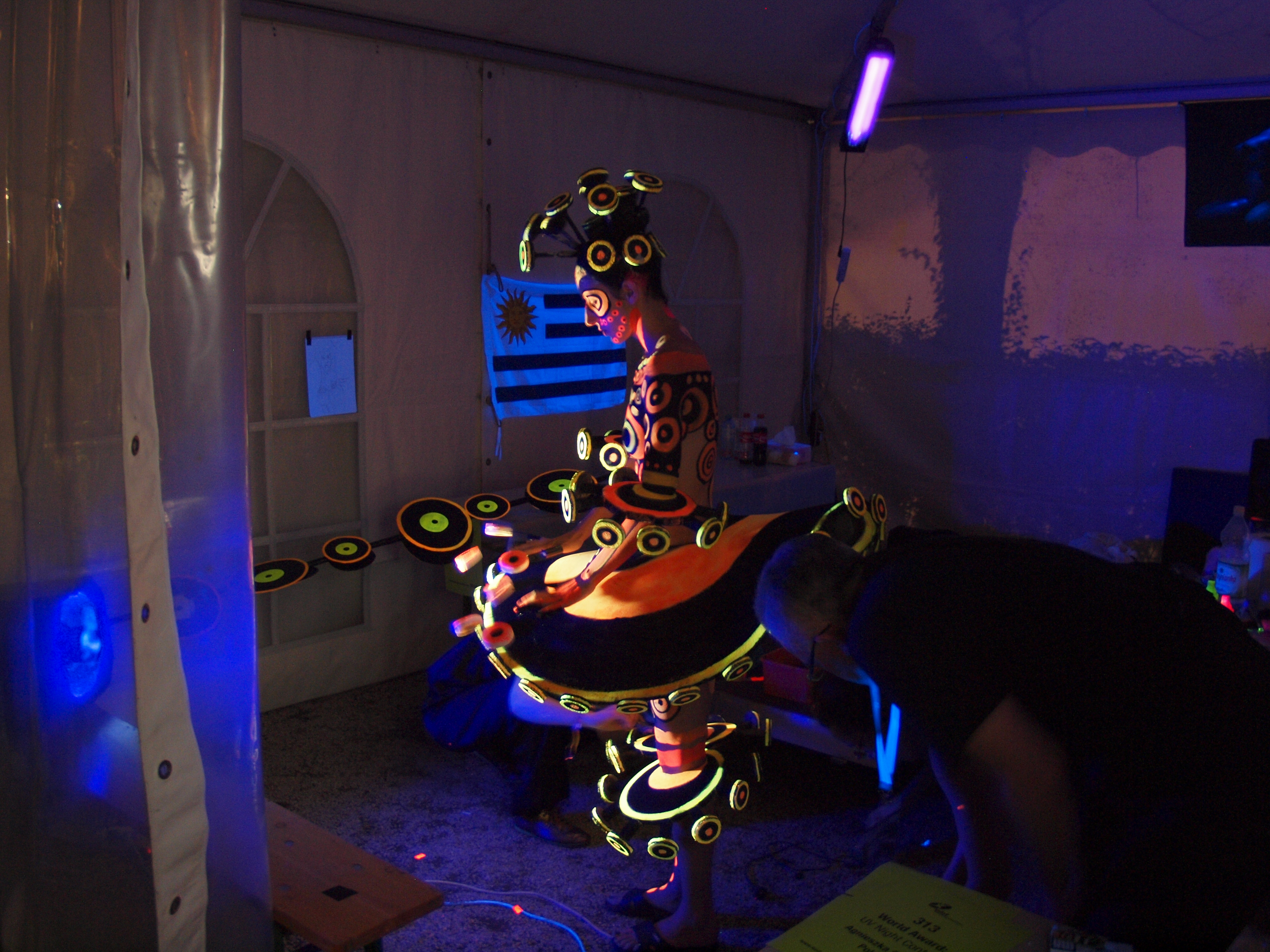
Fluorescent body paint will show up as bright and colourful under ultraviolet light.

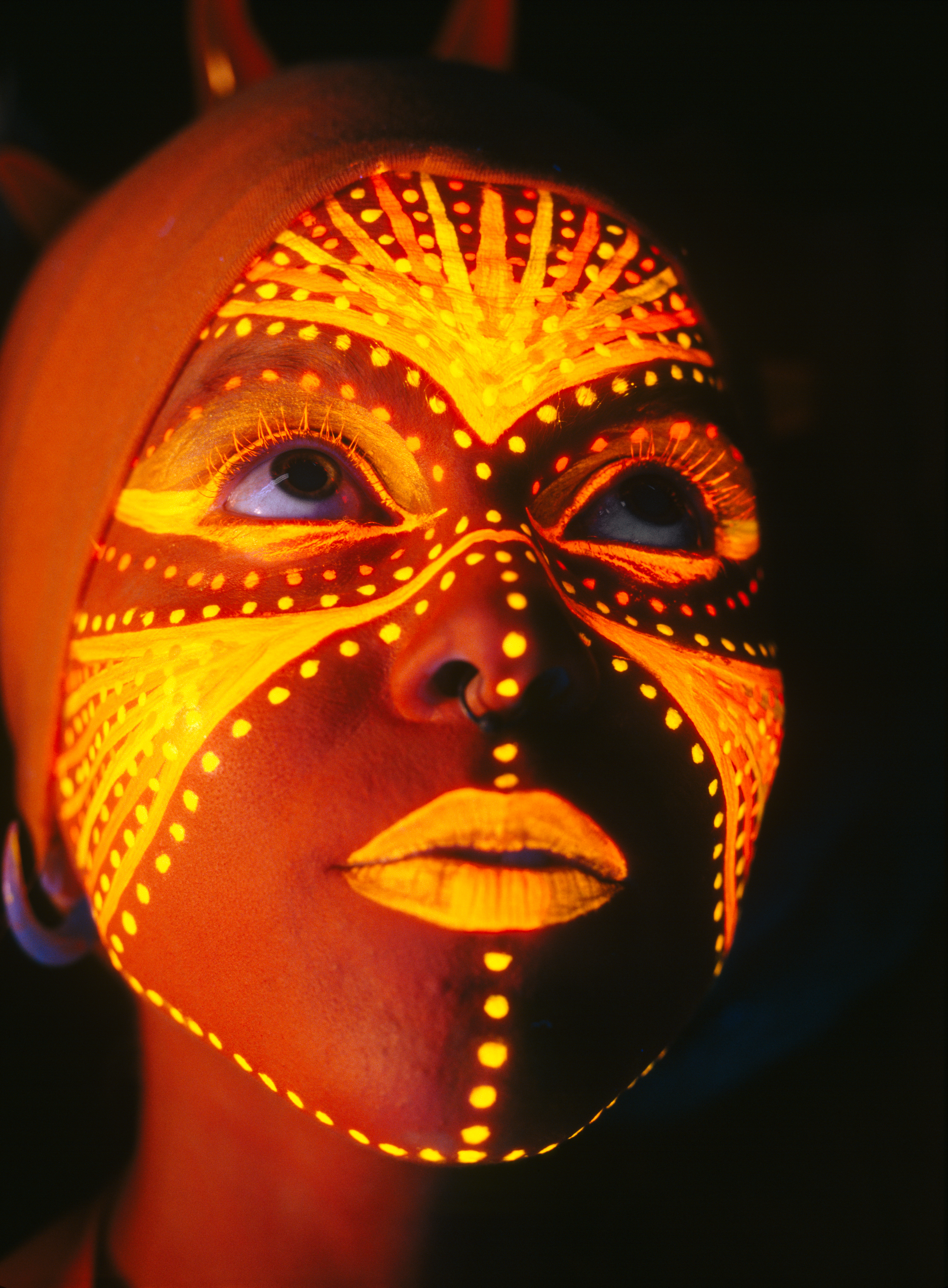
Body painting with fluorescent paint

Modern water-based face and body paints are made according to stringent guidelines, meaning these are non-toxic, usually non-allergenic, and can easily be washed away. Temporary staining may develop after use, but it will fade after normal washing. These are either applied with hands, paint brush, and synthetic sponges or natural sea sponge, or alternatively with an airbrush.

Contrary to the popular myth perpetuated by the James Bond film Goldfinger, a person is not asphyxiated if their whole body is painted.

Liquid latex may also be used as body paint. Aside the risk of contact allergy, wearing latex for a prolonged period may cause heat stroke by inhibiting perspiration and care should be taken to avoid the painful removal of hair when the latex is pulled off.

The same precautions that apply to cosmetics should be observed. If the skin shows any sign of allergy from a paint, its use should immediately be ceased. Moreover, it should not be applied to damaged, inflamed or sensitive skin. If possible, a test for allergic reaction should be performed before use. Special care should be paid to the list of ingredients, as certain dyes are not approved by the US FDA for use around the eye area—generally those associated with certain reddish colorants, as CI 15850 or CI 15985—or on lips, generally blue, purple or some greens containing CI 77007. More stringent regulations are in place in California regarding the amount of permissible lead on cosmetic additives, as part of Proposition 65. In the European Union, all colorants listed under a CI number are allowed for use on all areas. Any paints or products which have not been formulated for use on the body should never be used for body or face painting, as these can result in serious allergic reactions.

As for Mehndi, natural brown henna dyes are safe to use when mixed with ingredients such as lemon juice. Another option is Jagua, a dark indigo plant-based dye that is safe to use on the skin and is approved for cosmetic use in the EU.

== Body marbling ==
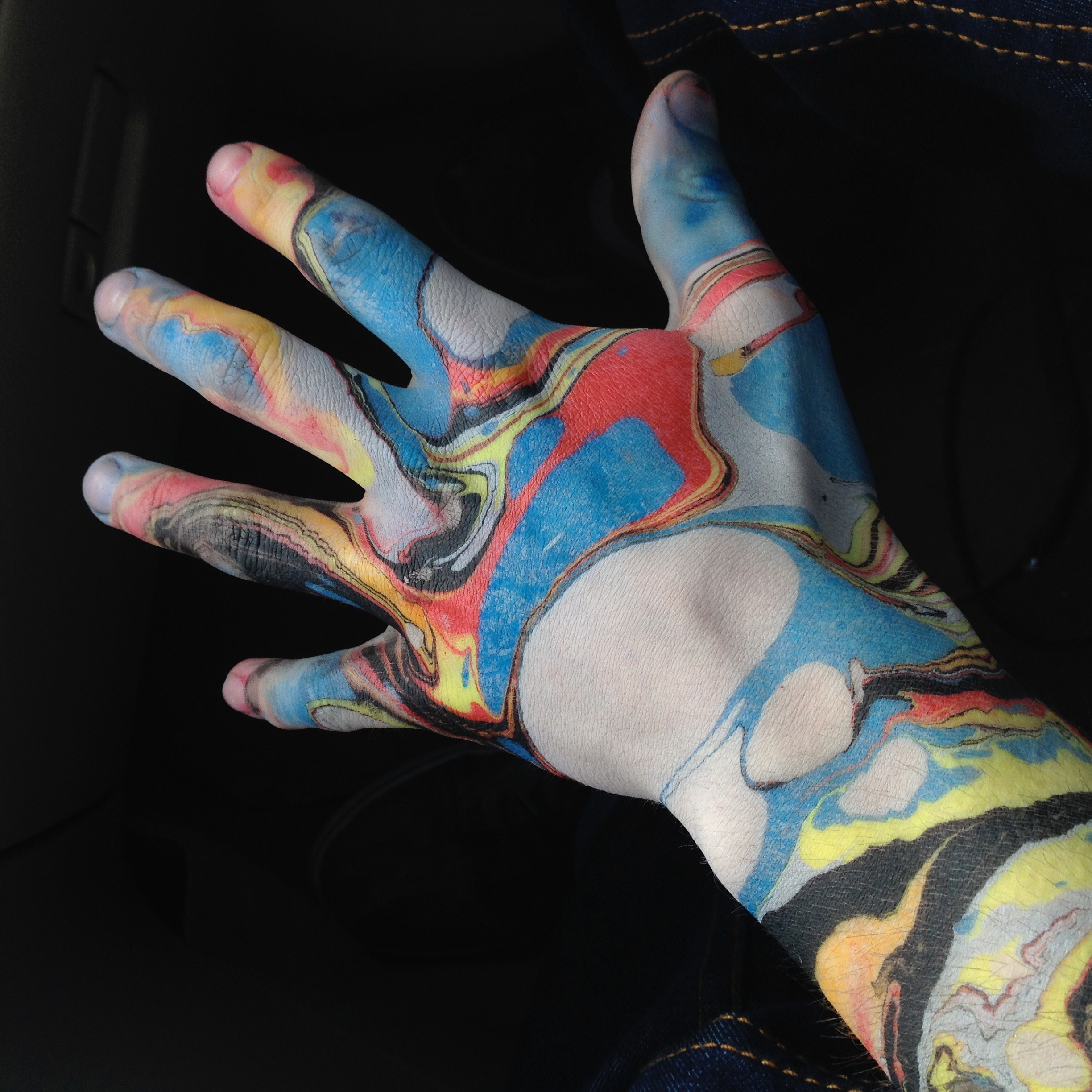
A hand marbled by dipping into floating non-toxic paint

Hands and faces can be marbled temporarily for events such as festivals, using a painting process similar to traditional paper marbling, in which paint is floated on water and transferred to a person's skin. Unlike the traditional oil-based technique for paper, neon or ultraviolet reactive colours are typically used, and the paint is water-based and non-toxic.

== Hand art ==
"Hand art" is the application of make-up or paint to a hand to make it appear like an animal or other object. Some hand artists, like Guido Daniele, produce images that are trompe-l'œil representations of wild animals painted on people's hands.

Hand artists work closely with hand models. Hand models can be booked through specialist acting and modeling agencies usually advertising under "body part model" or "hands and feet models".

== Body glitter ==
The application of glitter and reflective ornaments to a woman's breasts, often in the shape of a bikini top or crop top and sometimes alongside nipple tassels, is known as glitter boobs. Like body paint, this decoration is popular with festivalgoers. Buttocks are also sometimes decorated in a similar manner, and the adornment of the a woman's pubic area is known as a vajazzle.

== Media ==
Body painting features in various media. The popular TV variety show, Rowan & Martin's Laugh-In, featured bodies painted with comedic phrases and jokes during transitions. The Pillow Book, a 1996 film by Peter Greenaway, is centred on body painting. The 1990 American film Where the Heart Is featured several examples of models who were painted to blend into elaborate backdrops as trompe-l'œil. Skin Wars is a body painting reality competition hosted by Rebecca Romijn that premiered on Game Show Network on August 6, 2014.

== See also ==
- Body art
- Corpse paint
- Make up
- Mehndi (so-called henna tattoos)
