= Trina Merry =

American multimedia artist

- Born: Seattle, WA
- Education: BA in Film
- Alma mater: Azusa Pacific University
- Known for: Bodypainting
- Notable work: Human Motorcycle Project, Urban Camouflage
- Website: trinamerry.com

Trina Merry (born 1980). is an American multimedia artist that uses the human body as a brush or a surface. She is best known for her trompe l’oeil street art performances that camouflage human canvases into their environments as well as her op art "human sculpture" installations. Merry is recognized as one of the top body painters in the world. Additionally, Merry's work highlights societal issues such as gender identity & equality, body image, and American consumerism.

== Early life and education ==
Merry was born in Seattle, WA and moved to San Jose, CA when she was 12. She graduated from Azusa Pacific University in Los Angeles, CA in 2002 with a bachelor's degree in film. Initially planning to pursue a career in film, she interned for Mel Gibson and worked in films and TV in the Art Department.

In 2005, Merry was struck by lightning and developed a sensitivity to electricity. In an effort to heal, she moved to Yosemite. During that period, Merry had the opportunity to attend a Dresden Dolls concert, a band whom she helped sign while working for Yamaha's Artist Relations Department. The Dolls were touring with the Australian band, The Red Paintings, who incorporated live body paintings during their performances. Amanda Palmer convinced Merry to get body painted. Merry describes that night as "a transformational experience", and her passion for bodypainting was born.

Merry moved back to San Jose, CA and began experimenting, blending models into graffiti in Clarion Alley, creating installations for the SubZERO Festival in the SoFA District, and bodypainting for her gallery exhibitions.

In 2011 Merry relocated to New Orleans to apprentice under world-renowned body painter, Craig Tracy (as seen on Skin Wars). During her apprenticeship, Merry and Tracy collaborated on several notable pieces. This includes a "Visit Las Vegas" advertisement, commissioned by the City of Las Vegas, that appeared as a double page spread in the 2012 Sport Illustrated: Swimsuit Edition.

In 2013, Merry was invited to participate in the Watermill Center Summer Program, a laboratory for the arts founded by Robert Wilson in Southampton. Excited at the opportunity to grow within the unique environment the Watermill Center offered and learn from with performance artists Marina Abramovic and Robert Athey, Merry created multiple living body art installations, including four displayed during the Watermill's Center 20th anniversary benefit, "Devil’s Heaven".

Additionally, Merry studied visionary art with Alex and Allyson Grey at the Omega Institute in 2017. This contemporary art movement focuses on the expression of psychedelic experiences, and according to Alex Grey, "the artist's mission is to make the soul perceptible". Due to the shamanistic roots of ancient body paintings, Merry pursued the training in order to connect visionary art with body painting's rich cultural history.

== Career ==
=== Early works ===
In 2009, Merry exhibited with the Guerilla Girls at SOMArts. This created an early impression on Merry's future feminist works. Merry's mixed media painting "Imperial Wartime Jellyfish" featured Geishas trapped inside a nuclear fallout jellyfish with the "hear no evil, see no evil, speak no evil" gestures. Surrounding them were multiple red glitter bombs falling from the sky. After completing "Television Totem Pole" for the 2010 SubZERO Festival, Merry continued to explore and focus her artistic talents on body painting.

As she dedicated herself to the mastering of bodypainting, Merry's art career led to her creating installation art, performance art, and fine art photography. While living in San Francisco, Merry was inspired to begin her "Graffitti Camouflage" performance art series in Clarion Alley. For her body paint performance art, Merry blended live models into the city's graffiti and mural walls. Graffiti Camouflage piqued the interests of thousands online, and it became Merry's first project to go viral.

Merry had many other early successes with installation and performance art. Her performance art "Drool" was featured at SOMArt's annual "100 Performances in the Hole" event in 2014.

Commercial successes were also achieved in Merry's early art career. While Merry did live body painting for Iggy Pop and The Stooges, James Williamson was so impressed by her work that he commissioned her to create album covers for the band.

==== Human Motorcycle Project (2012-2014) ====
For the 2012 International Motorcycle Show, Merry created human sculptures of a sports bike, dirt bike, and a cruiser. Real life Supercross rider Erin Bates was the rider on each human-bike, wearing a painted on outfit for each composition. Merry told the Huffington Post, "Everyone has seen the pictures of scantily clad women next to motorbikes and cars and it can look a bit trashy. I wanted to take the idea of a beautiful woman and the motorbike and turn it on its head by making the bike from the bodies of the models. Nothing like this has ever been done before." The project landed Merry four gold awards at the 2013 American Advertising Awards (Addy's) including best in show. Additionally, Ripley’s Believe It Or Not! highlighted the project for special distinction.

=== Street Art Photography & Happenings ===
==== Urban Camouflage (2014-Current) ====
After moving to New York City, Merry was inspired to do live body paintings in the streets of the bustling city. Continuing her signature camouflage style, Merry blended models into the city skyline and popular city scenes. The goal of "Urban Camouflage" was to connect with the city and explore its gender dynamics. In an interview with BuzzFeed in 2014, Merry remarked, " New York is such an aggressive, violent city-characteristics we usually associate with masculinity- when in fact there are way more women living here than men...I think many women move here hoping to live Sex and the City lives, when the reality is most women have to ditch their fancy designer heels on the subway for more practical sneakers."

==== Lost in Wonder (2014) ====
As a way to explore tourism's effects on monumental locations, Merry created live body paint art at each of the New Seven Wonders of the World. Merry traveled to sites such as the Pyramids of Giza, Machu Picchu, and the Great Wall of China to camouflage models into these historical sites. Merry explained to A Plus that, "at major tourist sites like these, there are masses of visual consumers ‘taking’ from this environment without really appreciating the space or the history and culture of the people who made these structures. Artists are culture makers so I couldn't approach this trip the same way — We 'made' a picture and gave energy back to these places." The completed series, subsequently titled "Lost in Wonder", reminds others to stop, look, and truly appreciate the wonder that can be found all over.

==== San Francisco: Visions from the Fog (2015) ====
Across the city of San Francisco, Merry painted nude models into their natural surroundings. Her models recreated gestures from famous works of art such as Matisse's "Dance" in front of the San Francisco Painted Ladies and Frida Kahlo’s "Two Fridas" in front of Lombardi Street. In an interview with Refinery29, Merry said the following about the series: "It is a female body-positive series that examines various stages of womanhood, including a baby, two pregnant women, and an older former Vogue model. The works also question censorship in the contemporary American media."

==== Sweet Land of Liberty (2016) ====
In 2016, Merry traveled to Washington D.C to create eight trompe l’oeil street art performances in front of national landmarks such as the White House, Supreme Court, and Lincoln Memorial. Merry describes how she incorporated strong, feminist tones within each piece: "I went with the most iconic sites of power. I was looking to dynamically contrast masculine versus feminine, and power versus freedom." When asked about the series's significance amidst the election of Donald Trump, Merry stated that, "It’s important to be discussing freedom and power right now in light of the election, and especially in regards to the female body...so I feel like this series of work is more important than ever right now."

=== Photography ===
==== Astrology Series (2015) ====
Captivated by how astrology influenced art across different times and cultures, Merry created her "Astrology" series as a way to examine astrology's current impact on the world. Each photograph in the series captures a human sculpture that Merry created for each of the twelve astrological signs. Ultimately, the series attempts to serve as an anthropological research project for Merry. Although Merry does not believe in astrology, she created the series to examine astrology's significance in pop culture and why people still use it to explain their world.

==== Happy Daze (2016) ====
Merry collaborated with Beverly Hills fashion designer Lauren Moshi to create a human sculpture of Moshi's popular "Happy Daze" design. According to Moshi, "The Happy Daze design was inspired by our love of the 60s and 70s, as well as icons of that era that are known to put a smile on peoples faces.". Similar to Merry's other human sculptures, models were painted and arranged to give the illusion of the Happy Daze design. Merry's final artwork is a relief-style rendition of the design that incorporates both three dimensional and two dimensional elements.

==== Lust of Currency (2017-Current) ====
In an effort to critique the art market, Merry reinterpreted over 20 of the most expensive art pieces in the world.. The body paint photography series incorporates models blended into backdrops of some of the world's most influential and expensive artworks. "Lust of Currency" was created to question how society values art, and each piece was named after the original artwork's most recent selling price. Additionally, the series questions how modern society experiences art on technological devices. While creating the series, the source images Merry pulled from the internet were oftentimes pixelated, cropped, miscolored, or flipped. Merry still printed the images as-is and camouflaged people into them in order to discuss the viewers’ experience. Mid-Series, Da Vinci's "Salvador Mundi" resold for $450.3 million, so Merry changed the name of her artwork.

=== Live Stream Performances ===
==== "Living Election Map" (2016) ====
In 2016, New York Magazine live streamed Merry body painting models with the outline of all 50 US states during the presidential elections. As states' electoral votes rolled in, Merry would body paint each respective state in either red for a republic majority state or blue for a democratic majority. During the magazine's Facebook live stream, Merry's performance gained over 4.5 million views, over 3,800 views, and over 1,000 shares.

==== Happy Little Trees (2017-Current) ====
Bob Ross serves as inspiration for Merry across her "Happy Little Trees" series. Merry will oftentimes paint-a-long to Ross's The Joy of Painting at in-person events or during broadcast live streams. While recreating Ross's painted landscapes, Merry substitutes the oil paints and cotton canvases for body paints and nude human bodies

==== & Then I Smoked Two More (2018) ====
In an effort to promote cannabis awareness, Merry and Lauren Moshi collaborated again to create a pop-art inspired body art piece. On the celebrated cannabis holiday 4/20, Merry live streamed herself camouflaging models into a set of joint-smoking lips designed by Moshi. One of the model's extended legs was even turned into the rolled joint. The artwork's title is a homage to the song "Smoke Two Joints" by The Toyes.

=== Installation Art ===
==== Collaborations with Theresa Because (2013-2014) ====
In collaboration with multimedia artist Theresa Because, Merry completed several body paint performance art projects such as "Objectified", "The Human Temple" and "Sexpartite and Nuance". Merry's "Objectified" series highlights themes of materialism and consumerism, and the project was featured across several galleries, museums, and art spaces including the ESMoA and the San Jose Convention Center.

==== San Jose Museum of Art (2014) ====
Merry created temporary installations & performances at the San Jose Museum of Art including a collaboration with Andy Goldsworthy for their "Momentum" exhibition.

==== Body Dysmorphia on Pink (2018) ====
Merry explored themes of body dysmorphia and humans’ relations with food with the video performance, "Body Dysmorphia on Pink". The performing woman, fully nude and painted entirely pink, was offered a buffet of food options. As the model applied paint to her body with the food, the performance asks the audience to observe how certain foods are treated and perceived by the young actress. "Body dysmorphia on Pink" ultimately questions how society "wears" food and why foods are thought of as either good or bad.

==== Objectified 2.0 (2019) ====
In 2019, Merry revisited her "Objectified" series with a reboot. The performance art series features body painting models posing and interacting within common living spaces. The series questions society's relationship with their living spaces and materialism as well as the objectification of women in the modern world. Merry explains the following in her artistic statement: "Do the living spaces that surround us own us or do we own them? My Objectified series poses these questions and allows viewers to come up with answers by creating a conversation within the self." Performances from the series were featured at The Untitled Space gallery in New York City.

=== Video Art ===
==== Drool (2014) ====
At WORKS San Jose, Merry debuted a live performance of "Drool" while recording the overhead shorts her body painted models made. From above, Merry's models shape shifted into a sculptural skull and then danced with umbrellas. The piece was inspired by the surrealism of Salvador Dalí and the musical talents of Tom Waits. Additionally, the still shot of the human sculpture skull was used as the cover art for James Williamson and Carolyn Wonderland remastered single "Open Up and Bleed".

==== Reflections 2.0 (2018) ====
At the NARS Foundation Spring Open Studios, Merry collaborated with five body-positive influencers for a special body paint performance. The tableau vivant installation confronts the audience with themes of feminism and the new definition of freedom within an evolving society. Each influencer served as a silent actor as they quietly moved around the propped-filled scene in full body paint.

==== Shrouds of our Sisters (2018) ====
The "Shroud of our Sisters" video highlights the toxic relationship between women and envy. Merry, acting as a shaman, uses performers and body paint to metaphorically excommunicate the jealousy out of women. The performance ultimately emphasizes the importance of self acceptance.

==== Glass on Painted Bodies (2019) ====
"Glass on Painted Bodies", a contemporary art performance filmed by Merry, conceptualizes the relationship between body and identity. In the performance, bodypainted women tug at their skin and press their painted bodies against glass in an effort to appreciate how their body alters its shape.

==== Pink Petal Lipstick (2020) ====
Merry's performance "Pink Petal Lipstick" explores how the lack of ingredient transparency can affect women's health. In response to a 2010 FDA study about lead contamination in lipsticks, Merry paints her entire face with a tube of hot pink lipstick.

==== Objectified: Black Couch (2019) ====
As part of her Objectified series reboot, Merry's performance art "Objectified: Black Couch" questions materialism and female objectification in society. Bodypainted female performers pose with and even become furniture and home accessories as they surround a black, velvet couch.

==== Objectified: Purple Couch (2019) ====
"Objectified: Purple Couch" is another recorded performance that's part of her most recent Objectified series. As models silently interact with props and a purple couch, Merry's bodypainted performers continue to explore the themes of consumerism, materialism, and objectification.

==== Objectified: Pink Couch (2019) ====
In "Objectified: Pink Couch", Merry records another living space come to life. Four performers conceptualize the relationship between possessions, female objectification, and identity as they pose in a room dominated by a bright, pink couch.

==== Objectified: Red Couch (2019) ====
In a room with whitewashed brick walls, a red velvet couch, and a grey fur rug, nude performers strut in bright body paint and various props. As they interact with the living space, the audience must question whether they are living in the room or becoming part of it.

==== Objectified: Cream Chair (2019) ====
In this tableau vivant performance art, bodypainted performers silently move and strike poses in a room centered around a cream colored chair. The audience questions the role of possessions and women as the performers become human vases, lamps, candle holders, and cake stands.

==== Objectified: Black Chairs (2019) ====
With two, domineering chairs taking center stage of a room, Merry's performance art continues to explore the topic of materialism and objectification. As the nude, body painted performers bring life into the room and the props they hold, the audience must question if they are giving their possessions a life of their own.

==== Objectified: Pink Dollhouse (2020) ====
Filmed at Dallas Dollhaus, Objectified: Pink Dollhouse explores the topic of female objectification within a living space dominated by feminine objects and the color pink. The audience must question whether they see the performers as women or as the objects they are becoming.

== Notable exhibitions ==
- 2019 "This is Pain", Oculus World Trade Center, New York, NY
- 2019 "Objectified", Untitled Space Gallery, New York, NY
- 2019 "Bodies of Evidence", Getty Villa, Los Angeles, CA
- 2019 "Eden", Spring/Break Art Show, New York, NY
- 2018 "Superfine! Art Fair", New York, NY
- 2018 "Fun House", Barrett House, Poughkeepsie, NY
- 2018 "Is There a Mother in the House", Woman Made Gallery, Chicago, IL
- 2017 "alice + olivia: Takes Over Bloomingdale’s 59th Street", Bloomingdale's, New York, NY
- 2017 "Satellite Art Fair", Miami, FL
- 2017 "Red Dot Art Fair", Featured gallery, Miami, FL
- 2017 "Lust of Currency", Con Artist Collective, New York, NY
- 2017 "Traverse", Chinatown Soup, New York, NY
- 2017 "Whitney Biennial", with Occupy Debt Fair, Whitney Museum of American Art, New York, NY
- 2016-17 "Red in View" with MPA, Whitney Museum of American Art, New York, NY
- 2016-17 "Small Matters of Great Importance", Edward Hopper House, NY
- 2016 Live Performance at Museo Bardini, Florence, Italy
- 2016 Live Performance at Pisa, Domus Comeliana, Pisa, Italy
- 2016 Artist Talk and Performances at Villa Il Palmerino, Florence, Italy
- 2016 Lemon Frame Gallery, Tel Aviv, Israel
- 2015 "Silence of the Circus", The Watermill Center, Southampton, NY
- 2015 "Momentum", The San Jose Museum of Art, San Jose, CA, catalogue
- 2014 "Past, Present and Future: The Conservancy at 25", The Frank Lloyd Wright Building Conservancy, Chicago, IL
- 2015 "Art of Innovation", Anno Domini Gallery, San Jose, CA
- 2015 Bell Foundation, Walnut Creek, CA
- 2014 "Sexpartite in Nuance", WORKS San Jose Gallery, San Jose, CA
- 2008-2013 "The SubZERO Festival", Anno Domini Gallery, San Jose, CA
- 2013 "Devil’s Heaven", The Watermill Center, Southampton, NY
- 2013 "Experience 04: Objectified", ESMoA, Los Angeles, CA
- 2013 "Chroma Coalition" Los Angeles, CA
- 2013 "Brilliant! Science: Decoding the Human Health/Body Art", California Academy for the Arts, San Francisco, CA
- 2012 "Phantom Galleries" San Jose, CA
- 2012 "Motion" Art Ark Gallery, San Jose, CA
- 2011 "100 Performances for the Hole", SOMArts Gallery, San Francisco, CA
- 2009 "Control Exhibition" SOMArts Gallery, San Francisco, CA

== Television appearances ==
Karl Pilkington, host of The Moaning of Life, became one of Merry's body paint models for the show's Season 2 premiere. Merry was also featured in Season 5, Episode 7 of Million Dollar Listing New York. During the episode, real estate agent and TV personality Ryan Serhant commissions Merry to create a unique body paint ad campaign for a 33-unit condo building in Chelsea. Despite the taboo attitudes towards the body paint advertising, the campaign went viral and the property broke sales records.

Additionally, Merry's artwork has been spotlighted across the news broadcasts such as The Today Show, CNN, ABC, and CBS News. Merry also created a custom set of human motorcycles for America’s Got Talent and body painted Japanese model, Nana Suzuki, on Nippon TV’s Itte Q.

== Awards and Distinctions ==
- Edward Hopper House Award
- IFA Best Image Award
- 2015 International Fine Art Bodypainting Association Appreciation Award
- 2014 World Bodypainting Festival, First Place for Fine Art Installations
- 2013 Watermill Center, Summer Program Artist-in-Residence
- 2013 ESMoA, Artist-in-Residence
- 2013 Addy's San Diego, Best in Show for Human Motorcycles
- 2012 RAW Artist's Visual Artist of the Year
- 2012 Belle Foundation Grant Awarded

== Collections ==
Prints of Merry's artworks have been collected by various collectors and organizations such as:

- Lin Manuel Miranda
- Planned Parenthood
- Museo Di Bardini
- Domus Comelina
- Villa Il Palmerino
- Gil Rose & the Palm Springs Museum of Art
