= Roustan (surname) =

Roustan is a French surname. It may refer to:

- Antoine-Jacques Roustan (1734-1808), Genevan pastor and theologian
- Didier Roustan (1957–2024), French sports journalist
- Marius Roustan (1870-1942), French politician
- Max Roustan (born 1944), French politician, National Assembly member for Gard
- Paul Roustan (born 1979), French body painter and photographer
- Théodore Roustan (1833-1906), French diplomat

== See also ==
- Roustam Raza, also known as Roustan
