= The Moaning of Life =

- Sky publicity image
- Also known as: The Moaning of Life 2
- Genre: Travel documentary comedy
- Presented by: Karl Pilkington
- Composers: Mat Davidson; Vik Sharma
- Country of origin: England
- Original language: English
- No. of series: 2
- No. of episodes: 11

Production
- Executive producers: Celia Taylor; Richard Yee; Krishnendu Majumdar
- Running time: 44–45 minutes
- Production company: Sky UK television

Original release
- Network: Sky 1
- Release: 20 October 2013 – 17 November 2015

The Moaning of Life is a British travel documentary comedy television series broadcast on Sky 1. It follows Karl Pilkington around the world as he visits other cultures. Unlike An Idiot Abroad, which had a similar premise, The Moaning of Life sees Pilkington actually choosing to visit other countries in order to see how they face up to some of life's biggest issues with their cultures and customs. He also reassesses his life now that he has reached the age of 40, which he considers to be "middle age". The series has eleven one-hour episodes, and sees Pilkington visiting various countries in each episode. Its original broadcast run in the United Kingdom began on 20 October 2013.

Sky1 postponed the fifth and final episode of the first series – "Death", which sees Pilkington in the Philippines contemplating death with locals – after Typhoon Haiyan struck the Philippines in early November 2013. Originally scheduled for 17 November 2013, it was not broadcast until 17 December 2013.

The series was released on DVD and Blu-ray on 18 November 2013 in the United Kingdom.

Discovery Communications' Science began broadcasting The Moaning of Life in North America on 18 January 2014. The series aired in Australia from 17 February 2015 on BBC Knowledge.

A six-part second and final series was commissioned and premiered on 13 October 2015.

== Series overview ==
| Series | Episodes | Originally aired | |
| Series | Episodes | First aired | Last aired |
|---|---|---|---|
| 1 | 5 | 20 October 2013 | 17 December 2013 |
| 2 | 6 | 13 October 2015 | 17 November 2015 |

== Episodes ==
=== Series 1 (2013) ===
| No. overall | No. in series | Title | Directed by | Original release date | UK viewers (millions) |
|---|---|---|---|---|---|
| 1 | 1 | "Marriage" | Richard Yee | 20 October 2013 | 1.49 |
Although Karl has been with his girlfriend Suzanne for 20 years, he has never felt a need to marry her. He travels abroad to witness how other cultures handle marriage and see if he is missing something. In India, he explores the concept of an arranged marriage, accompanies "wedding detectives" as they secretly collect information on a man being considered for an arranged marriage on behalf of the family of his potential bride, and assists wedding planners in arranging a wedding with 5,000 guests. He then visits the United States, where he attends a "pheromone party". He is impressed by the concept of a drive-through wedding in Las Vegas because of its speed and convenience. Karl comes up with a unique concept for a couple's wedding and they follow his plan by marrying in a laundromat.: Locations featured: New Delhi, India; Bangalore, India; Los Angeles, United States; Las Vegas, United States
| 2 | 2 | "Happiness" | Benjamin Green | 27 October 2013 | 1.10 |
Karl goes abroad to discover how people in other cultures find happiness. In Mexico, he runs with a tribe that finds happiness in ultra-marathons and meets a group of people who find happiness in experiencing pain. He then moves on to the United States to join Tommy the Clown and his group of "hip hop clowns" who dance in the streets. He meets Justin Jedlica, who finds happiness in his appearance and is addicted to plastic surgery. Lastly, he spends a day with Daniel Suelo, who gave up his worldly possessions and finds happiness in a homeless lifestyle.: Locations featured: Sierra Madre Occidental, Mexico (Rarámuri lands); Guadalajara, Mexico; Compton, California, United States; Los Angeles, United States; Billings, Montana, United States
| 3 | 3 | "Kids" | Richard Yee | 3 November 2013 | 1.11 |
Karl sets out to learn why people have children. In Japan, he saves a turtle awaiting its fate as someone's meal at restaurant and keeps it in his hotel room's bathtub. He attends a traditional fertility festival and goes to a doctor to have his sperm tested. He then travels to Indonesia, where he helps at a natural birthing center and babysits an infant girl. At his next stop, Karl spends time with the Bajau people, "sea gypsies" who allow their children to roam freely with little supervision. Finally, he visits the United States, where he hires two adult dwarf actors to pretend to be young children for a young couple who are considering having kids.: Locations featured: Tokyo, Japan; Kawasaki, Japan (for Kanamara Matsuri); Bali, Indonesia; Sulawesi, Indonesia; Los Angeles, United States
| 4 | 4 | "Vocation & Money" | Benjamin Green | 10 November 2013 | 1.09 |
Karl travels overseas to explore how people find their vocations. In Japan, he spends time with Dr. NakaMats, an 85-year-old inventor who has Karl try out some activities to boost his brain. Then he tries out the careers of traditional Japanese benriya or odd-job man, including posing in figure drawing and cleaning an apartment where he accidentally pokes a hole in a paper wall. He flies to South Africa, to meet self-made millionaire Kenny Kunene, who shows Karl his extravagant lifestyle including swimming in a pool full of girls, riding in Kenny's new McLaren car, riding in a helicopter over the township, having a butler, browsing at luxury watches, and getting a facial and massage. He learns from Kenny's friend Gayton McKenzie on how to "hustle" or negotiate buying fish and selling it for a profit. He joins Gayton at a club where he is asked to eat sushi off a woman's body. His final stop is in Los Angeles, where Karl meets Project Runway designer Joshua Christensen and tries his hand at being a catwalk model in a Hollywood fashion show.: Locations featured: Tokyo, Japan; Johannesburg, South Africa; Cape Town, South Africa; Los Angeles, United States
| 5 | 5 | "Death" | Richard Yee | 17 December 2013 | 0.68 |
Karl has never even attended a funeral, but he sets out to see how other cultures handle death. His first stop is a coffin shop in Ghana that specializes in coffins custom-made in any shape the buyer wants. He next helps a mortician prepare the body of Madam Comfort Asaaba Cofie, a 79-year-old woman who had died a month earlier, for her funeral. In Taiwan, Karl trains with a professional mourner and follows them to a funeral parlor. He next goes to the Philippines, where he visits a cemetery that also functions as a small town where people live and work among the dead and assists in the exhumation of a body. His next stop is Sagada, where he helps transport and place a coffin hung on the side of a cliff. Back at home, Karl takes delivery of a custom coffin he ordered himself and his girlfriend in the shape of a Twix wrapper, and then drives to the beach to demonstrate his idea for a new type of memorial along the boardwalk there. Inspired by benches with plaques dedicated to the deceased, Karl procures a memorial rubbish bin in honor of Comfort.: Locations featured: Accra, Ghana; Taipei, Taiwan; Manila, Philippines; Sagada, Philippines; Swanley, United Kingdom; Hastings, United Kingdom

==== North American broadcasts ====
In North America, Science premiered the episodes in a different order, as follows:

- Episode 2, "Happiness", 18 January 2014, 10:00 p.m. EST
- Episode 3, "Kids", 18 January 2014, 11:00 p.m. EST
- Episode 1, "Marriage", 25 January 2014, 10:00 p.m. EST
- Episode 4, "Vocation & Money", 6 February 2014, 7:00 p.m. EST
- Episode 5, "Death", 6 February 2014, 8:00 p.m. EST

"Vocation & Money" and "Death" originally were scheduled to air at 10:00 p.m. EST on 1 February and 8 February 2014, respectively, but both were rescheduled to 6 February 2014.

At about three-quarters of the way through each North American broadcast, Science aired a brief "never-before-seen clip" from The Moaning of Life featuring Pilkington commenting on an issue during filming of the episode.

=== Series 2 (2015) ===
| No. overall | No. in series | Title | Directed by | Original release date | UK viewers (millions) |
|---|---|---|---|---|---|
| 6 | 1 | "Art" | Unknown | 13 October 2015 | 1.34 |
Karl delves into art that is 'not just all flowers in vases anymore'. In New York City, he models for a body painter Trina Merry, visits the Museum of Modern Art, and participates in performance art in Times Square. He makes art expeditiously with boxing gloves and transcends dog shit into art with Sprinkle Brigade. In Los Angeles, Karl attempts to create vomit art with Millie Brown, and then he heads back to England to experience his own interpretation of art – a murmuration of starlings.: Locations featured: New York City and Los Angeles, United States; Somerset, United Kingdom
| 7 | 2 | "Identity" | Unknown | 20 October 2015 | 1.05 |
Karl explores the nature of identity and how hair, apparel, language, and gender play a part. Karl starts by sending his DNA off to be analysed and getting a 'hair prosthetic' installed to cover his baldness. Then Karl travels to Mexico to experience identity tied to unique footwear and a whistled language. Heading back to the States, Karl also tries his hand at celebrity impersonation and embodying a female figure.: Locations featured: Atlanta, United States; Matehuala, Mexico; Oaxaca, Mexico (title card says Santa Cruz); Las Vegas, United States; Newport Beach, United States
| 8 | 3 | "How to Live Your Life" | Unknown | 27 October 2015 | 0.97 |
Karl explores different ways of life and delves into the values and priorities others use guide their time on Earth. He spends time with a Buddhist monk, a costumed vigilante, a Mormon fundamentalist polygamist family, a creative philanthropist, an nonagenarian skydiver, and a man who does 'extreme ironing'.: Locations featured: Monterey, California, United States; San Diego, United States; Rocky Ridge, Utah, United States; Santa Cruz, California, United States; Denver, United States; Moab, Utah, United States
| 9 | 4 | "The Body" | Unknown | 3 November 2015 | 0.90 |
On the Langjökull glacier in Iceland, Karl tries exercising in cold weather in just his pants. Next, Karl travels to India to meet a practitioner of Shivambu, or urine therapy, and another man who believes he doesn't need to eat, as he absorbs all the energy he needs from the sun. In Tokyo, Karl tries out some robotic arms, has therapy to reduce the size of his head, and finds out what it's like to be blind. Lastly, back in London, Karl gets his testicles inspected for lumps for the first time.: Locations featured: Langjökull, Iceland; Calcutta, India; Saharanpur, India; Tokyo, Japan; London, United Kingdom
| 10 | 5 | "Waste" | Unknown | 10 November 2015 | 0.85 |
First, Karl travels to Mexico to perform an underwater inspection in raw sewage and meet a man who's recycled plastic bottles into his own island. In the United States, he meets a man who eats roadkill, helps clean up a hoarder's house, and gets inspired by a man who's downsized to the point of living in a skip. Karl ends his trip in Germany, where he joins a group that plays music on trash bins and discarded items.: Locations featured: Mexico City, Mexico; Isla Mujeres, Mexico; Asheville, North Carolina, United States; Las Vegas, United States; Austin, Texas, United States; Osnabrück, Germany
| 11 | 6 | "Time" | Unknown | 17 November 2015 | 0.68 |
Karl starts the episode by having his future told via rumpology. Then he travels around the United States to have his upper body put in casts, get made up to look and feel old, after which he competes against some elderly track and field athletes, and spends time with a man pretending to be a dog. In Germany, he explores the process of plastination to preserve bodies. Back in the US, he examines personal doomsday bunkers and simulates what it would be like to live on Mars, visiting Kellie Gerardi and her research crew at the Mars Desert Research Station.: Locations featured: Berlin, Germany; Chicago, United States; Bremerton, Washington, United States; Pittsburgh, United States; Guben, Germany; Los Angeles, United States; Hanksville, Utah, United States

== Home media ==
Despite the final episode having not yet aired in the United Kingdom due to its postponement, the entire first series was released on DVD and Blu-ray on 18 November 2013. The series was also made available on Amazon.com. An advertisement featuring Pilkington complaining about Amazon.com was released on YouTube to promote the series.

The second series titled The Moaning of Life 2 was released onto DVD and Blu-ray on 23 November 2015. A boxset featuring both series was also released on 23 November 2015 on DVD and Blu-ray.

== Books ==
- The Moaning of Life: The Worldly Wisdom of Karl Pilkington (Canongate, 2013) ISBN 978-1782111511
- More Moaning: The Enlightened One Returns (Canongate, 2016) ISBN 978-1782117315
