= Rabarama Skin Art Festival =

International body painting festival

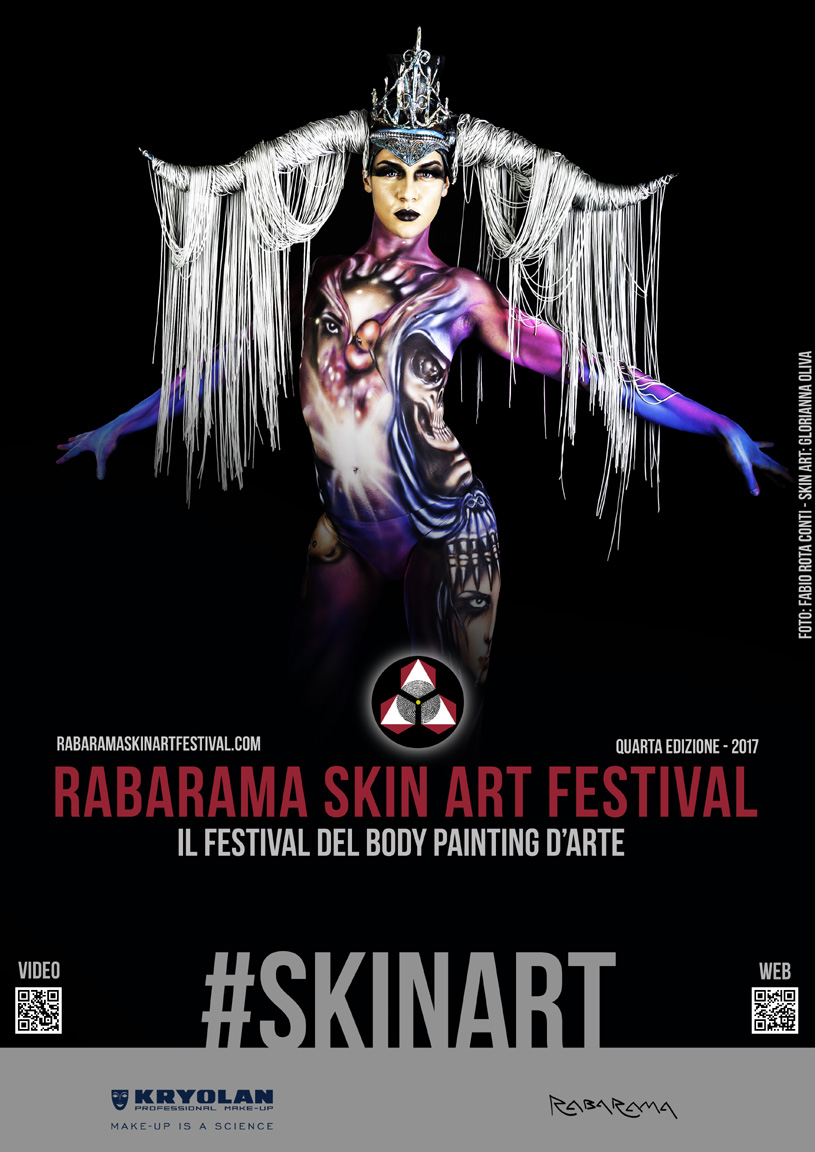
- Rabarama Skin Art Festival official poster, 2017
- Frequency: Annual
- Locations: Italy (Milano, Torino, Roma, Firenze, Savona, Merano, Reggio Calabria, Lecce, ... )
- Years active: 4
- Inaugurated: 2014
- Participants: 500
- Organiser: Kryolan Italia
- Website: www.rabaramaskinartfestival.com

The Rabarama Skin Art Festival (abbreviated: RSAF) is an international festival dedicated to the promotion of artistic body painting, in the form known as "Skin Art". Begun in 2014, the festival is held every year in Italy from May to October, with selections in various Italian cities. The final event was held in Merano (BZ) in 2014, 2015, 2016 and 2017. The festival is supported by a brand leader in professional cosmetics, by the artist Rabarama, and by various Italian municipalities. The international media partner is the body painting magazine "Skin MarkZ" (USA).

During year 2017, the festival started to create 3D scans of the body art works to create a virtual "Museum of Skin Art".

== The concept of "Skin Art" for the RSAF ==
The term "skin art" refers to a global and living art work made of body art, make-up, SFX, stage performance, video and music, with a strong message about issues related to the concept of “body”. The concept derives from the "Skin Art Manifesto", which states: "The omologation, the transformation of living beings in things and destruction on a global scale of nature are prevailing. Even if efforts are made to conceptualize and speculate about this, we have already started to feel it on our bodies."

== Events and actions related to the RSAF ==
During the 2015 edition of the IDAHOBIT: International Day Against Homophobia, Biphobia and Transphobia, the RSAF staged some flash happenings in public places in Florence and Catanzaro with painted models, to support the event.

In 2017, the RSAF partnered with the Venice International Tattoo Convention, to bring the "skin art" on the stage, with a live performance.

== See also ==
- body art
- body painting
- World Bodypainting Festival
