= Karl Hammer =

Karl Hammer Kaatee (Amsterdam, 19 September 1969) is a Dutch investigative journalist, author and art photographer.

== Youth ==
Karl Hammer was born on Zeedijk nr. 35 (de Wallen) in the Amsterdam red light district. After falling into one of the canals at the age of 6, he was nicknamed Flipper after he dolphin in the 1964 TV-series. Raised within an abusive and violent family, he spent most of his youth in homes and boarding schools. After frequently running away in his teenage years he ended up in the Amsterdam nightlife where he led a life amidst prostitutes, weapons, violent robberies and fraud. For all of these he was convicted at one time or the other and thus was sent several times to jail. He took the name Hammer from his stepfather after his biological father (Piet Kaatee) had died. It was only after being sent once more to jail that he decided to change his life. In a 2011 Dutch interview he told reporters; "Suddenly I saw that I couldn't go on like this. My life didn't amount to anything. That had to change.

== Media ==
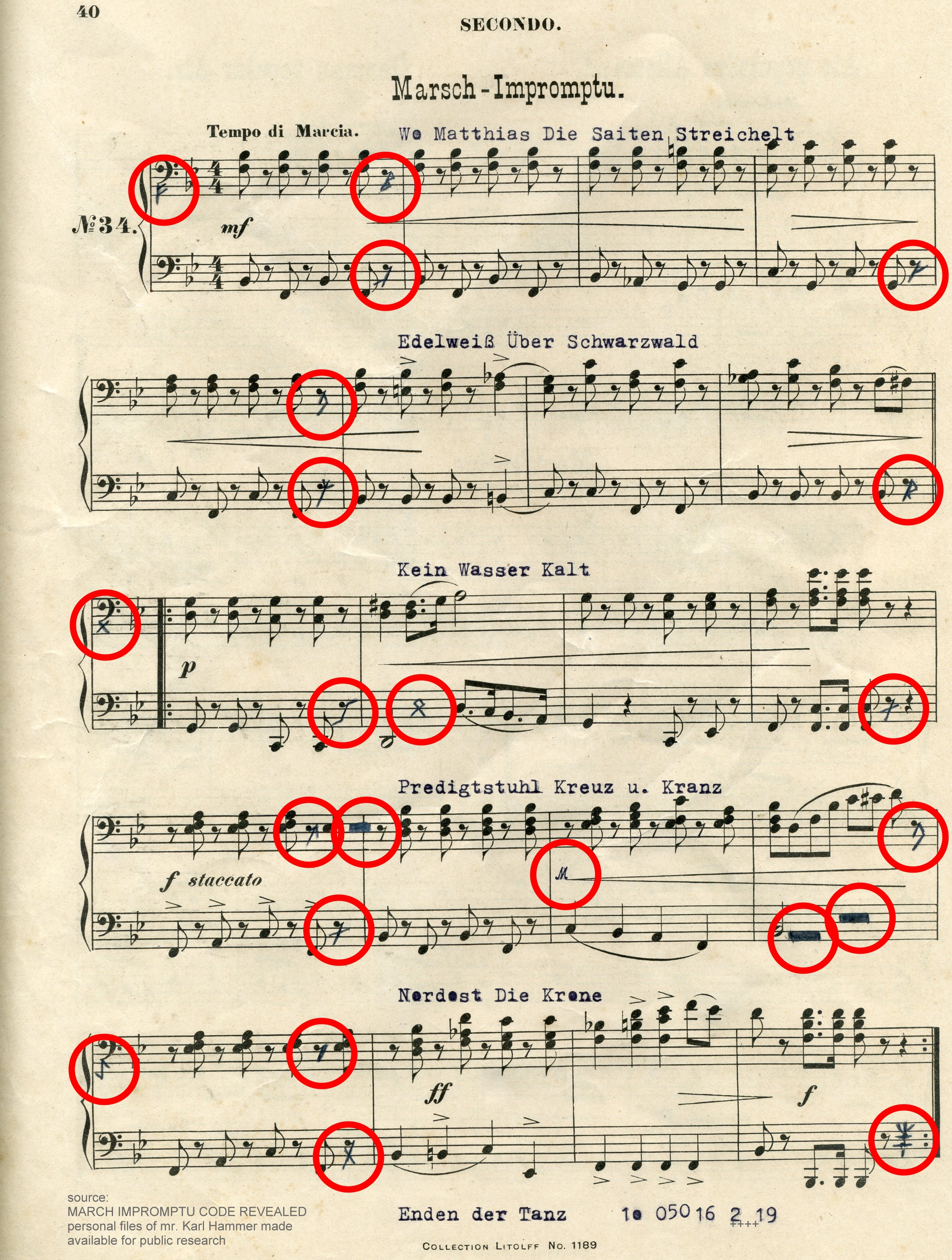
March Impromptu Code

In the early '80s Hammer started as a bus cleaner with a Dutch public broadcaster and worked his way up from there. He eventually became production assistant, taught himself how to be a video editor, and turned director and producer, working on some of Holland's biggest productions with Joop van den Ende. In subsequent years Hammer was involved with the introduction of private radio and TV RTL in the Netherlands and Belgium, owned a trucker radio station and was advisor to media moguls such as Leo Kirch (Kirch Gruppe).

After his career in radio and TV, Hammer turned author in 2006, publishing his first book, Satans Lied (Satan's Song). It is a story about one of the most bizarre art thefts in history, that of a panel of Jan van Eyck's Ghent Altarpiece. The book was published in various countries and languages, among which German, French, Polish (Tajemnica Oltarza Gandawskiego), Turkish and English (The secret of the sacred panel).

Subsequent books were specifically aimed at the Dutch market and not translated into other languages; but in 2012 Hammer published a controversial book, The hunt for the Nazi Gold, secrets of the March Impromptu Code revealed. It describes an investigation into a document, drafted at the end of World War II by Martin Bormann, that allegedly contained directions to locate Hitler's personal diamonds and a stash of Nazi gold. These items were hidden somewhere in the Bavarian mountains and intended to finance the terror group Werwolf. Hammer's book received worldwide attention and for some time he, just like another hunter, Leo Giessen, led various expeditions, mostly near Mittenwald. The expeditions remain unsuccessful and no diamonds or gold have been retrieved.

== Photography ==
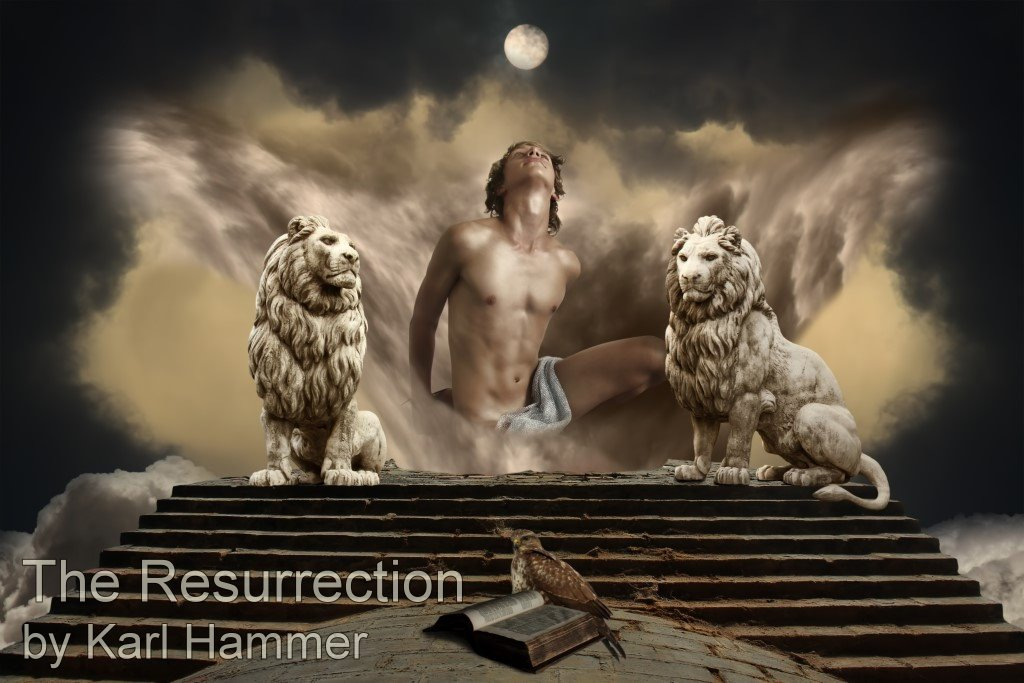
Imaginary Realism by Dutch art photographer Karl Hammer

Next to his work as book author, Hammer is an art photographer, specifically in the relatively new genre imaginary realism, which diverts from conventional magic realism. Where magic realism uses magical and unreal elements in an otherwise realistic environment, Hammer only uses realistic elements but set in an imaginative scene. Comparable with how classic painters would depict, for instance, biblical scenes. Although his art work sometimes depicts well-known mythological or religious storylines, he also uses contemporary or fictional themes. Hammer conveys entire stories and even subplots through the use of color, symbols and geometrical figures. It is therefore important to find the little details that he has often hidden, like a book, a skull or certain animals that have symbolic meanings. Thus, an apparently 'simple' thematic image suddenly turns into a multi-layered art work (he also often hides triangles in his work). According to curators and critics at the Dreamscapes Exhibition his style has a somewhat 'dreamy character with spiritual overtones'. Because of his uses of lighting and color, Hammer was in a 2012 Saatchi Gallery contest honored as 'a Rembrandt in photography'. His work is exhibited worldwide and represented by Marcel Salome.

== Sources ==
- ABC News: "Music Score May Lead to Nazi Gold".
- Yahoo News: "Filmmaker believes musical score could lead to Nazi gold".
- De Wereld Draait Door (Dutch Talkshow): "TV interview with Karl Hammer".
- EenVandaag (Dutch current affairs TV): "Hitler's diamonds".
- EenVandaag (Dutch current affairs TV) with English subtitles: "Hitler's diamonds".
