= Paul Roustan =

American painter

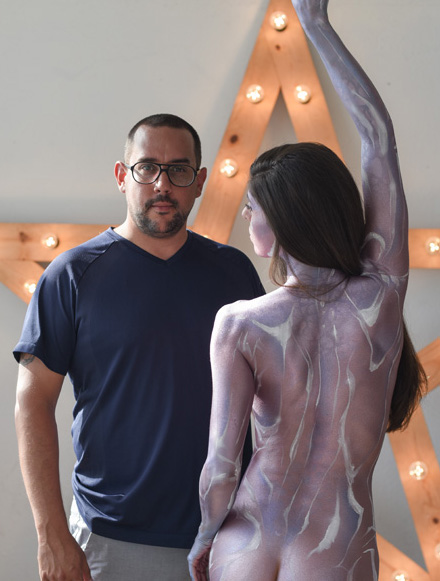
- Born: September 5, 1979 (age 46); America
- Occupation: Body Painting Artist

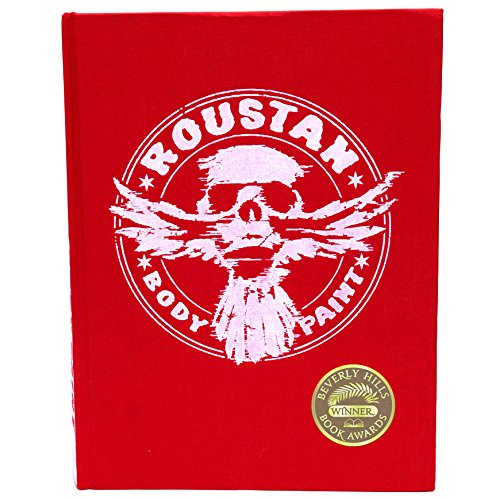

Paul Roustan (born September 5, 1979) is an American contemporary body painter and photographer. Roustan paints people for a variety of needs including gallery shows, private photography workshops & commissions, tradeshows, TV/Movie, and advertising campaigns. He has done work on shows such as Skin Wars, Hollywood Today Live, The Queen Latifah Show, and in the movie Ted 2.

His work has appeared on media including, Spike TV, The Game Show Network, Sabado Gigante, the Chicago Sun-Times, The New York Post, GQ, Playboy, Maxim, and galleries along the East and West coasts. His work has been acquired in over 200 private collections. Roustan is an alumn of both the School of the Art Institute of Chicago and Rhode Island School of Design

In 2011, Roustan won the North American Body Paint Championship in the category of Airbrush. It was at this event that the iconic Skull Dove image was first created that he now uses as his logo and the cover of his book.

== Career ==
In 2005, as a freelance editorial illustrator for Boink Magazine, a sex positive magazine featuring photo spreads, creative writing, and education from male and female students of Boston University, Roustan pitched the idea to the editors to paint a model for one of the photo spreads. His first published partial body painting was a test painting on the founder of Boink Magazine, Alecia Oleyourryk. Roustan's first full body painting was published in the same issue featuring a photo series displayed in reverse giving the illusion that a female model, Anna, was undressing painted clothing. In actuality, the clothes were painted on step-by-step and they were photographed sequentially by photographer and Boink Co-founder, Christopher Anderson. This photo series was mentioned in an on the Howard Stern Show interview with Alecia Oleyourryk. Stern initially could not tell that the model was painted.

His work has gone viral multiple times including a woman camouflaged as a moth, and a My Little Pony Transformer.

In 2015, Roustan published a large hardcover coffee table book featuring over 130 of his studio body paintings. The book was funded completely through Kickstarter and has received rave reviews on Amazon and a lot of viral publicity from various blogs.

Roustan has been interviewed/featured on various media including Blisss Magazine, The Inertia, Dodho Magazine, Tat2X Blog, Maxim Magazine, The Beach Reporter, and Makeup Artist Magazine, among others.

Paul Roustan currently resides in Redondo Beach, California with his wife and two daughters where he continues to do body painting professionally for various clients within the United States.

== Artworks ==
Body Paintings by Paul Roustan
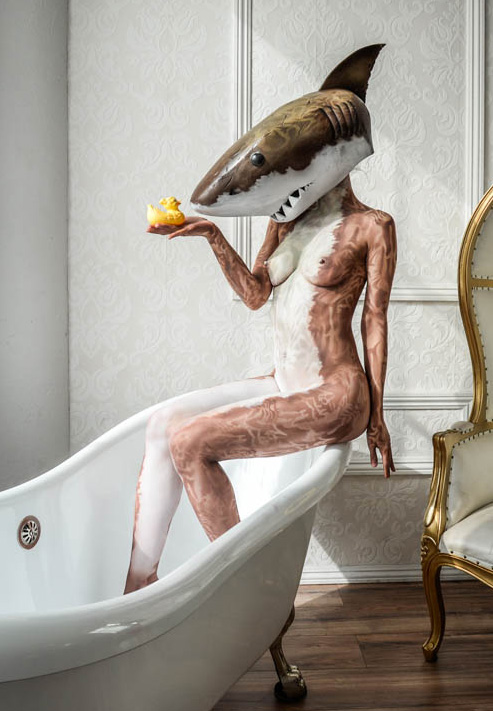

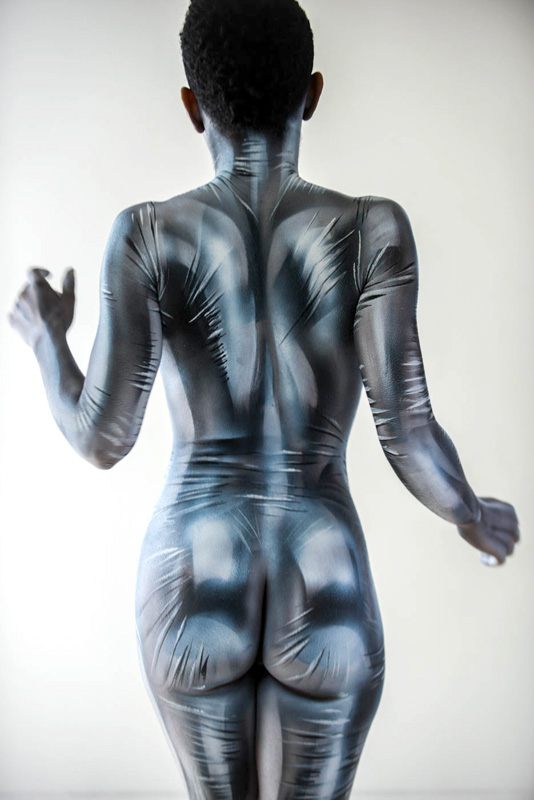

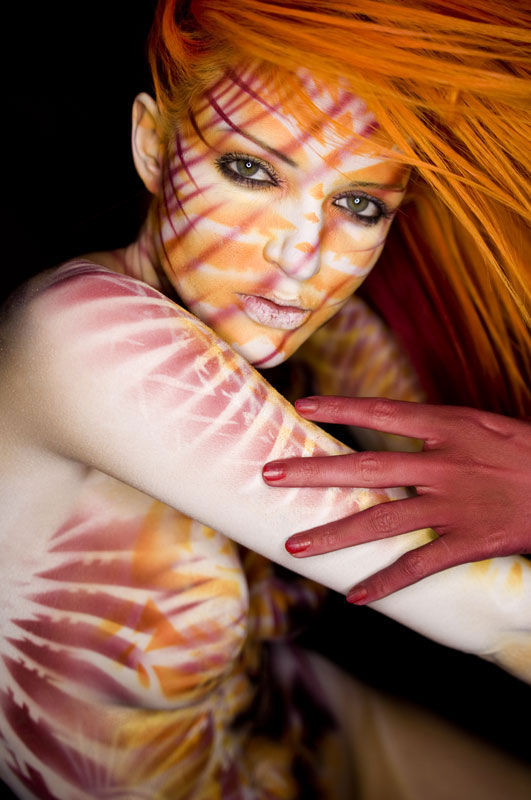

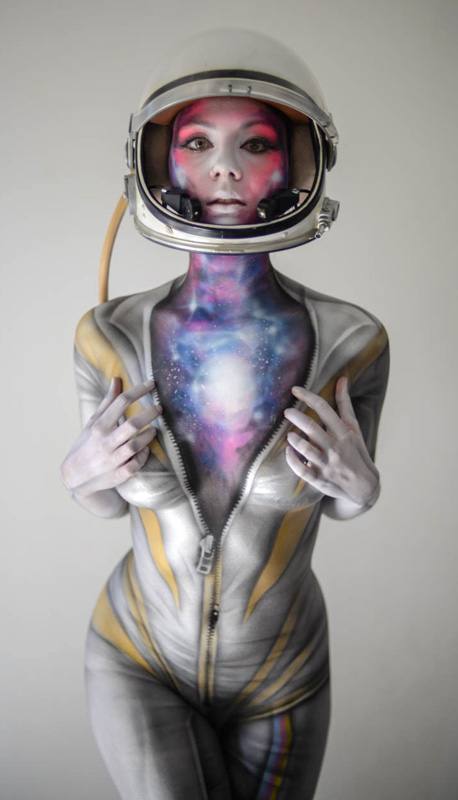
