= Michel Platnic =

French-Israeli artist

Michel Platnic מישל פלאטניק
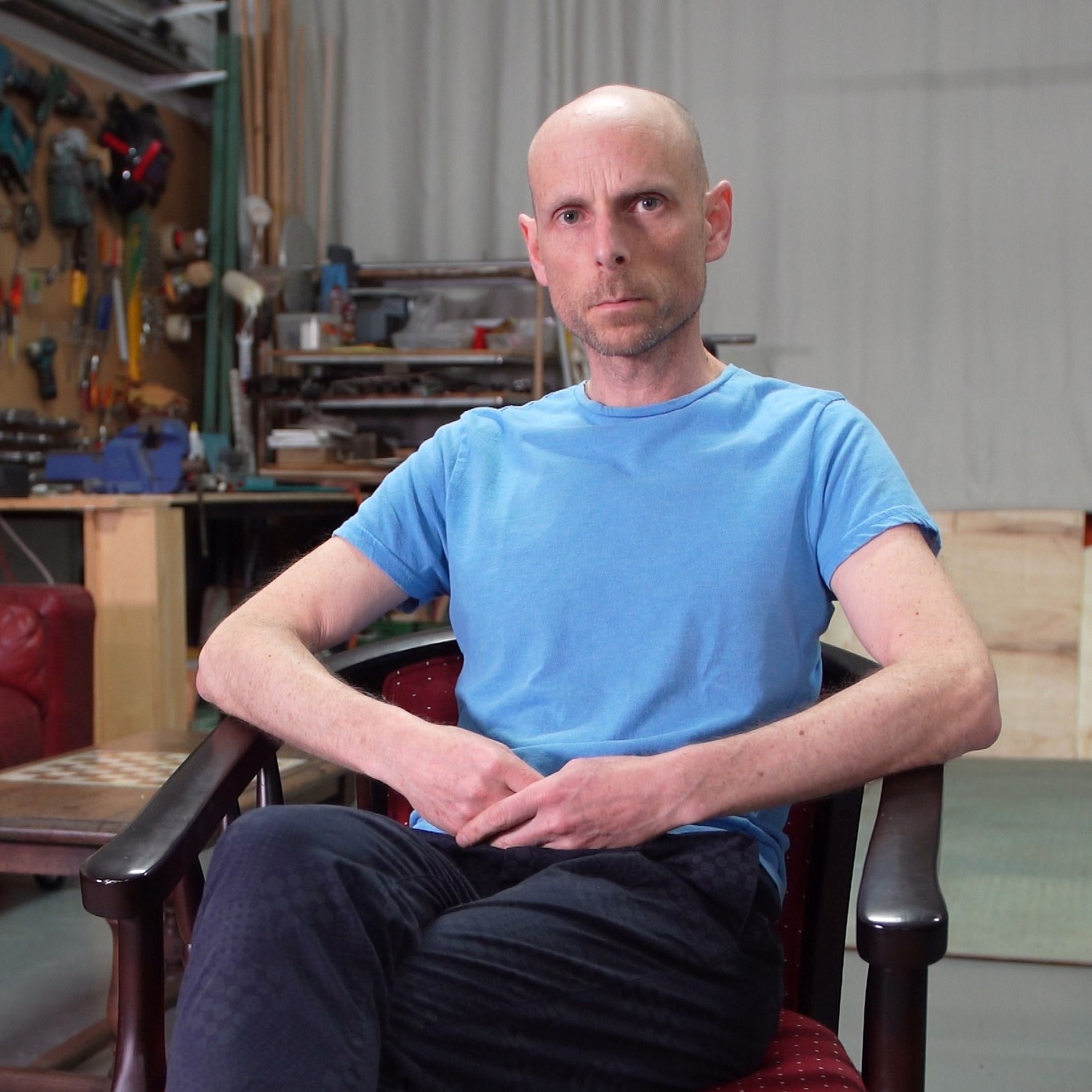
- Michel Platnic, 2020
- Born: 26 February 1970 (age 56); Villeneuve-Saint-Georges, France
- Known for: Living paintings, video installations and performances
- Website: www.michelplatnic.com

Michel Platnic (Hebrew: מישל פלאטניק; born 26 February 1970, France) is a French–Israeli contemporary visual artist who has been working in Tel Aviv since 1998, and in Berlin from 2014 to 2017. He is known for his "living paintings". He uses multiple mediums including photography, video, performance and painting.

== Biography ==
Platnic was born in 1970 in Villeneuve-Saint-Georges, France. In 1994, he completed his master's degree in electrical engineering at the Higher School of Electronics and Electrical Engineering – ESIEE in France. During his career as an engineer from 1995 to 2007, he published many articles, wrote several patents, some cited in more than 50 other patents, and has been editor in several international standards committees.

At the age of 28, he moved to Israel and in parallel to his work in High-Tech, he explored several fields. First looking his way into voice and corporeal expression, Platnic started learning in 2001–2002 acting and voice development at the Theater Arts Studio founded by Yoram Levinstein. In 2003, he explored physical theater, learning at the Body Theater, a method developed by Jacques Lecoq that combines physical movement and voice expression influenced by the traditional form of commedia dell'arte.

At the age of 33, despite the stable life in his high-tech job, he changed professional career and turned to fine art. In 2007 he started studying for another bachelor's degree at the Beit Berl Art College and graduated with honors in 2010. The same year he won a photography grant from the Shpilman Institute of Photography, was the subject of an extensive article in the "Gallery" supplement of the Haaretz newspaper and was selected to the ST-ART incubator for young artists.

In 2014, he moved to Berlin and studied at the Berlin University of the Art, as part of the "Art & Media Meisterschuler" program until 2017.

== Art career ==
Starting during his engineering studies, Michel embarked on many long journeys that took him along almost the entire continent of Asia and Oceania. One of his trips to Irian Jaya he met and was welcomed by Tribes that had hardly been exposed to the "West". After a long trek he reached a village where the inhabitants organized a ceremony to welcome him. People covered and painted their bodies with natural ingredients, and a traditional fight between two villages then was played out. Platnic considers this encounter as a major influence in his art.

=== The "Living Paintings" ===
During the first three years after he completed his art studies in 2010, Platnic showed his works in several solo exhibitions and tens of collective exhibitions. In 2013, he started being represented by Gordon Gallery. That year, he showed his new project which brought to life several scenes from Francis Bacon's paintings. Platnic re-staged Bacon's paintings and placed them in a different context. He did not confine them to the conventional canvas but painted instead on humans (including himself) and life-size cinema sets that were a backdrop for his video works.

In 2017, Platnic created his new video work Genesis-deGenesis in which he examined the structures of human consciousness, a video diptych inspired by the biblical narrative of the creation of the world. Through pictorial, sculptural, performative and cinematic means, Platnic created a sort of one-man-show in which he symbolically "recreated" the act of creation. Platnic extracted from the biblical narrative the typical Western terminology that still shapes our understanding of the world, and the structures of our society. In 2018, he made a short movie version of this work which was selected and shown in many short-film festivals around the world and at the Esports Digital Art Prizes 2019.

In 2020, Platnic released his new body of works "Bordermine" inspired by self-portrait drawings by Egon Schiele. In many of his previous works, Platnic's preoccupation was through the prism of a person within an environment, within a space. This work revealed a stronger focus on the human being, the psychological state of his models rather than their physical traits.

=== Video installations and performances ===
During his art studies at the Midrasha, Platnic exhibited video installation works and performances. During his studies in Berlin in 2014, Platnic focused on computer programming for generative works. Attaching sensors to his own body, his sound and visual performances started dealing more openly with world order of power leading to war and economic struggle.

== Artivism ==
Inspired by his research and ideas about the western world, Platnic initiated in 2019 an organization called ReGenesis, a worldwide platform to create and aggregate actions and synergies for environmental justice and sustainability through collective artistic concrete actions. ReGenesis is a digital tool for communication, education and research, for change-makers and other actors across the world to share experiences, encourage actions to create a responsible society where citizens take an active part in politics and initiate art projects, mainly in the public space. In 2020, ReGenesis was recognized by the United Nations Framework Convention on Climate Change knowledge-to-action hub for adaptation and resilience (UNFCCC) as part of the Nairobi work programme on impacts, vulnerability and adaptation to climate change.
