= Emma Hack =

Australian artist (born 1972)

Emma Hack (born 1972) is an Australian visual artist known for her photographs of painted bare human bodies that visually merge with a patterned background wall, producing a chameleon-like camouflage effect. Her technique was developed in the early 2000s and inspired from wallpaper designs by Florence Broadhurst. The technique got wide exposure in the music video to Gotye's hit "Somebody That I Used to Know". Her 2014 work incorporated animals.

== Emma Hack Art Prize ==
In 2014 Emma Hack launched the Emma Hack Art Prize, offering a $5,000 acquisitive prize and exhibition opportunity to artists based in South Australia. The inaugural exhibition theme was 'My environment' and the overall winner was Natasha Natale for her piece Stump, a delicate sculpture reflecting the fragility and decline of her home garden. The winner of the People's Choice award was Tiffany Rysdale for her piece Growth Spurt.

In 2015 the theme was 'Humanity in the environment'.

A selection of finalists is made and works are placed on display at the Adelaide Convention Centre. Works must be made available for sale and part of the proceeds is donated to the Australian Marine Mammal Welfare and Rescue Organisation (AMMWRO). The exhibition is part of the Adelaide Fringe.
