= Pheromone party =

Social event that involves sniffing anonymous pieces of clothing

A pheromone party is a social event attended by singles, in an effort to find their mate through sniffing anonymous pieces of clothing. The Pheromone Party concept builds on the "sweaty T-shirt experiments" performed by Claus Wedekind. Participants in these parties are told to sleep in T-shirts for three consecutive days. Once collected, the garments are placed in individual bags for singles to smell. If a person finds the smell agreeable, they are introduced to the owner.

Chemical basis of love

== See also ==
- Body odour and sexual attraction
