= Lauren Moshi =

American fashion designer

- Industry: clothing retailer
- Founded: 2006
- Founder: Lauren and Michael Moshi
- Headquarters: Los Angeles
- Products: essential tanks; t-shirts; hoodies; pants; dresses; skirts; accessories
- Website: www.laurenmoshi.com

Lauren Moshi is a Los-Angeles based apparel and lifestyle retail brand known for its line of graphic t-shirts. Created by brother-sister duo, Lauren and Michael Moshi in 2006, the collection is based on original, hand-illustrated artwork by Lauren. Lauren Moshi is sold in department stores and specialty boutiques worldwide.

The brand has also founded a brother line, basics label Michael Lauren. Michael Lauren features essential tanks, tees, hoodies, pants, dresses, skirts, and accessories.

Notable celebrities that have worn Lauren Moshi and Michael Lauren include Alessandra Ambrosio, Kate Hudson, Emma Roberts, Gigi Hadid, Bella Thorne, Jessica Alba, Kourtney Kardashian, Cara Delevingne, Selena Gomez, Julianne Hough, Mila Kunis, and Olivia Wilde. Lauren Moshi was also featured in Beyonce’s 2013 “Blow” music video, in which she wore the Frankie Wonder Woman Baseball Tee. In 2019 the label was accused by L.A. local artists and designers to be copying their designs without permission.

== Store ==
In 2011, Lauren Moshi launched their first pop-up store in Beverly Hills on Robertson Blvd. that functioned as both a boutique and art gallery for three months.

In 2012, Lauren Moshi opened their flagship store on Robertson Blvd. in Los Angeles.

== Collaborations ==
In 2011, Lauren Moshi collaborated with Disney Couture, designing a collection of graphic tees, tanks and sweatshirts; all boasting Moshi’s reimagined illustrations of iconic characters, Mickey and Minnie Mouse.

Later, in 2013, Lauren Moshi teamed up with Warner Bros to create a super-hero themed clothing line, incorporating characters Tweety, Wonder Woman, Batman, Batgirl, the Tasmanian Devil, Tom & Jerry, the Looney Tunes Family, Superman, and Supergirl. The capsule collections retailed at Bloomingdales.com and other online outlets.

Also in 2013, Lauren Moshi collaborated with Flywheel on a collection of women’s apparel. The tanks, sweatshirts, and sweatpants featured Lauren Moshi’s signature ‘diamond lips’ print and Flywheel’s tagline ‘You So Fly’. Product was sold exclusively at Flywheel studios.

Lauren Moshi continues to work with Epic Rights and Warner Music Group on licensing agreements to design apparel featuring artists such as Jefferson Airplane, Def Leppard, Billy Idol, The Grateful Dead, and more.

== Artwork ==
Lauren Moshi began as an artist, working in water color and ink. She graduated from Otis College of Art and Design, eventually teaming up with her brother Michael to screen print her drawings onto clothing and accessories.

Lauren Moshi debuted at Art Basel in 2013, with an event hosted by fashion blogger, Chiara Ferragni. Lauren and Chiara collaborated to create an exclusive design for the exhibit, including limited edition canvases and clothing styles.

Lauren’s artwork is now sold in their flagship store, as well as in boutiques around the world.
