= World Bodypainting Festival =

Annual festival and competition in Austria

Coordinates: 46°37′39″N 14°18′9″E

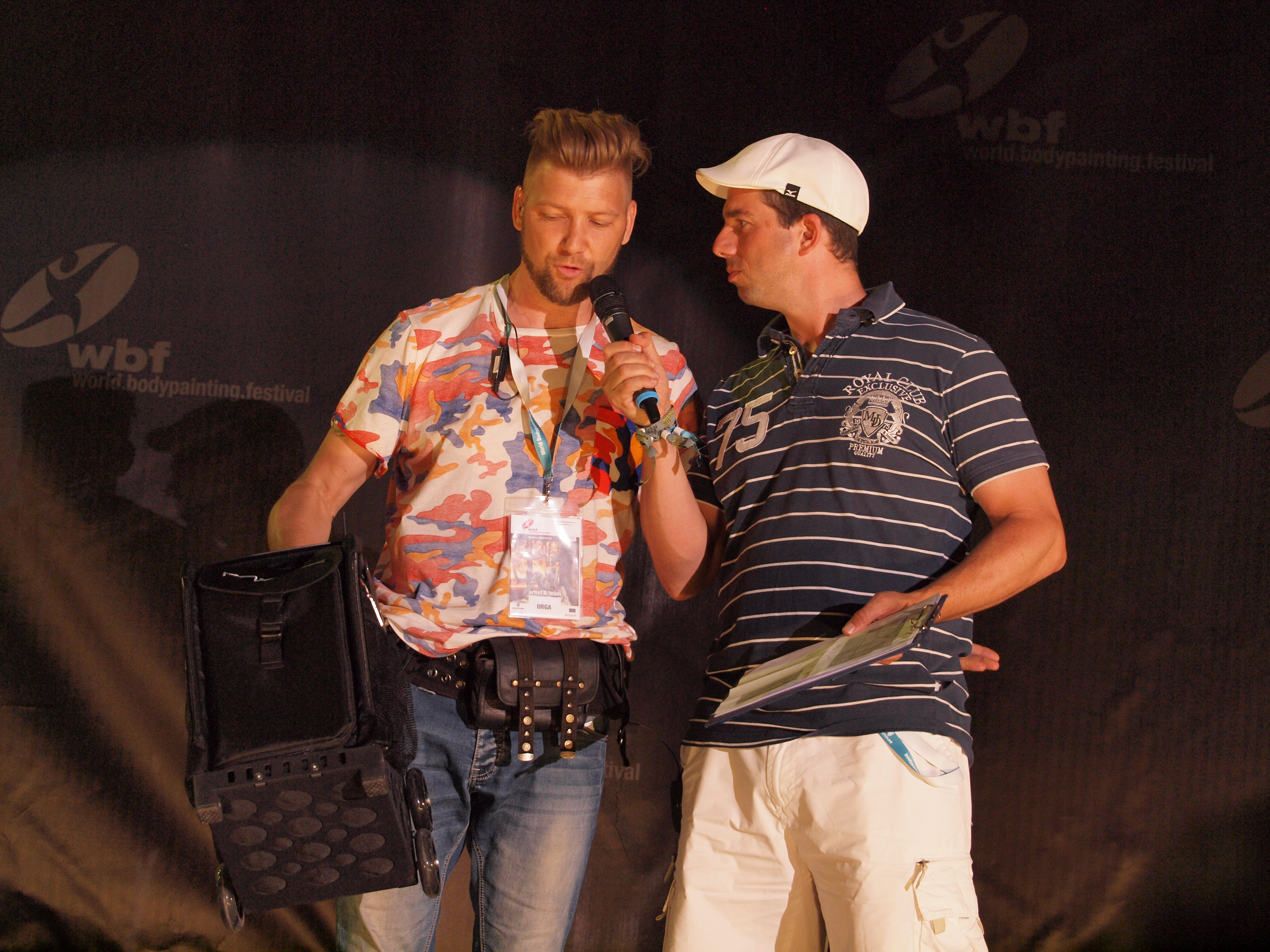
Alex Barendregt (left), the main organiser of the festival, with Markus Schenkeli, the host of the festival, in 2015

The World Bodypainting Festival is a bodypainting festival and competition which is held annually in Austria, since 2017 in Klagenfurt. It is attended by artists from 50 nations and attracts many thousands of spectators.

== Festival ==
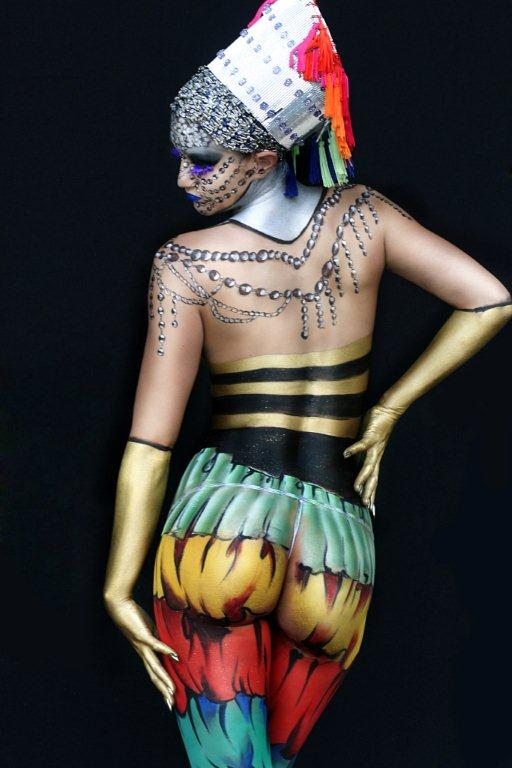
Artist Karen Chi Kwan Yiu (2012)

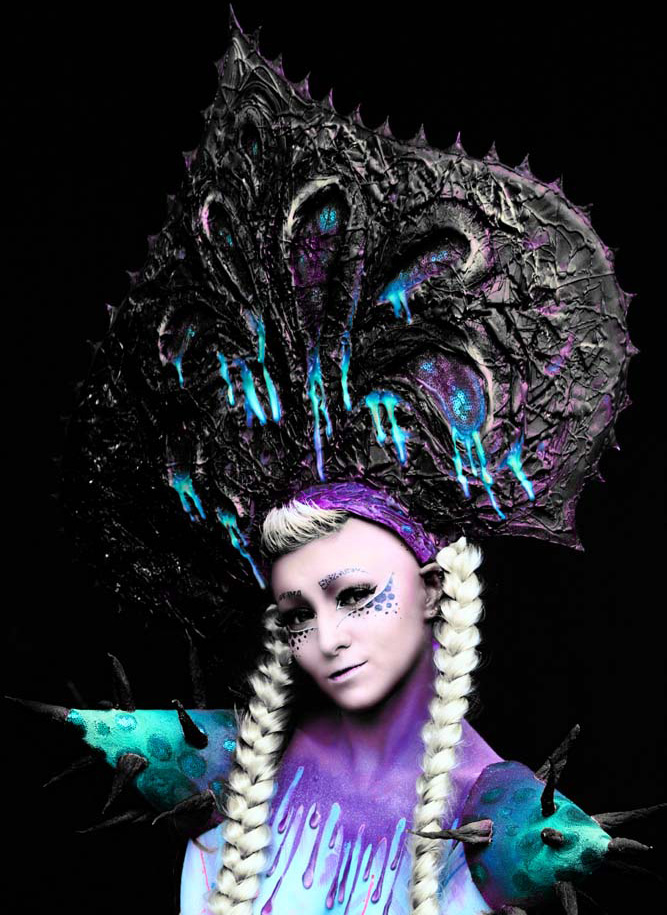
Artists J. Fusilier and L. Hammel (2011)

The World Bodypainting Festival is the biggest annual event in bodypainting culture, and provides a worldwide platform for the art. It takes place in summer, usually in July, as part of the festival season of the southern region of Austria. It attracts artists from more than fifty countries and more than 30,000 spectators, and has been involved in creating the modern bodypainting art movement.

The festival consists of a preparatory week of workshops and side events, followed by three main days over a long weekend. The workshops, run by the affiliated WB Academy, include lessons by leading artists in brush and sponge, airbrush, special effects, beauty make-up, and head dressing, including colour theory and history. All workshops are run and handled under the WB Academy. Side events include parties such as the surreal Costume Ball (Body Circus) with international DJs and musical stage performances, and also exhibitions, gatherings, and industry discussions.

The three main days are open to the general public in the Goethepark in Klagenfurt, dubbed "Bodypaint City". World, Special and Amateur Awards are held. The festival is open to adults and children, and is considered a family-friendly environment; visitors are able to step "into the surreal" and also to express themselves in participatory activities. Bodypaint City includes a VIP area, a bodypainting manufacturer and suppliers' market, fashion and crafts market, food and beverage vendors, headline stage bands, performers and international DJs throughout various musical zones. Artists compete on all three days with a given theme in the categories of brush and sponge, airbrush and special effects for the World Champion Award, announced on Sunday. Also included are the World Facepainting Award, Amateur Award, Installation Award, Special Effects Face Make-up, Make-up Battle Award and the Photo Award. The festival closes with a Paint Party.

== History ==
The festival was launched in 1998 in Seeboden in the state of Carinthia, as the European Bodypainting Festival by then tourism manager Alex Barendregt, to promote summer tourism to the region. It was the first "boutique event" of its kind in the world. Also launched in conjunction was the WB Academy, which in 2008 expanded its workshops worldwide. As the bodypainting movement was growing, on 12 October 2001 Barendregt launched the European Body Painting Association as a networking and support organization for bodypainting artists, and WB Production followed in 2010.

Due to the increasing attendance of international artists and supporters at the festival, in 2004 it was renamed the World Bodypainting Festival in association with the World Bodypainting Association. In 2011 Barendregt left his position at the tourist office and moved the festival to Pörtschach, on the Wörthersee. In 2017 the festival venue moved to the state capital of Klagenfurt, where it is held in the Goethepark. The city gallery (Stadtgalerie), the Museum of Modern Art Carinthia (MMKK), the literature museum (Musil Museum), theatres and privately owned galleries are all nearby, providing opportunities for networking and exhibition space for the bodypainting artists. The COVID-19 pandemic in Austria changed the festival. A hybrid version was developed for the years 2020 and 2021, with small local activities and an online award with over 600 participants from 60 nations. In 2022 the festival celebrated its 25th anniversary in Klagenfurt, the last event to be held in an open air park. From 2023 it became an indoor festival with a focus on the world championships and with fewer music concerts.

Following strategic changes in its organizational structure, the World Bodypainting Festival decided to expand its format by introducing smaller editions hosted in different countries. This approach allowed the festival to maintain its international presence while giving artists the opportunity to participate in events in different countries.

In 2025, two official World Championship titles were awarded. The Camouflage World Championship took place in Sterzing (Vipiteno), Italy, as part of the WBF Italy edition, while the Creative Makeup World Championship was held in Helsinki, Finland, under the WBF Finland edition. Both events marked significant milestones in the decentralization of the festival's competitive structure. The annual Carnival of Águilas in Spain is also part of the new format and hosts the World Championship in the Bodypainting Show category annually.

The WBF Online Awards are a special event that have been part of the World Bodypainting Festival program since the COVID-19 pandemic. While they are not classified as World Championships, the Online Awards provide artists from around the world with the opportunity to present their skills and compete internationally in a digital format. In 2025, the event recorded nearly 200 participants from more than 30 countries. As a result, the WBF Online Awards have become an established and integral component of the World Bodypainting Festival event structure.

== Gallery ==
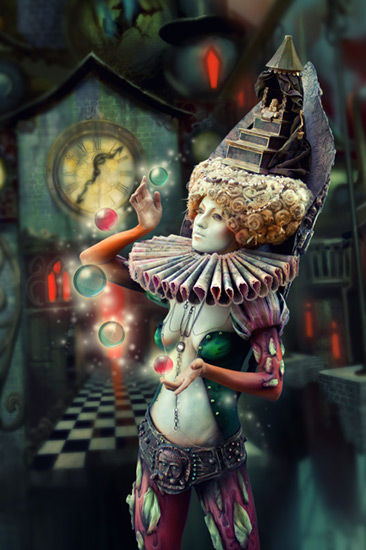
Artist Kristina Elizarova (2011)

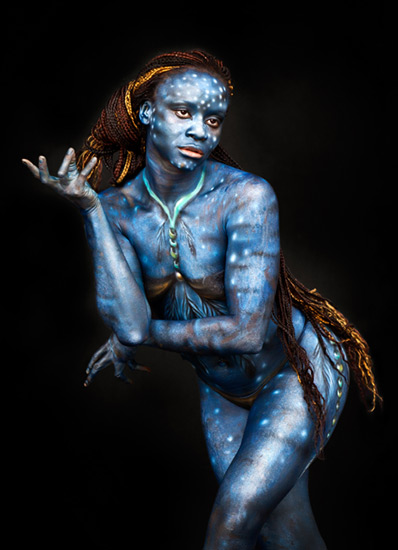
Artist Anja Pürkel (2011)

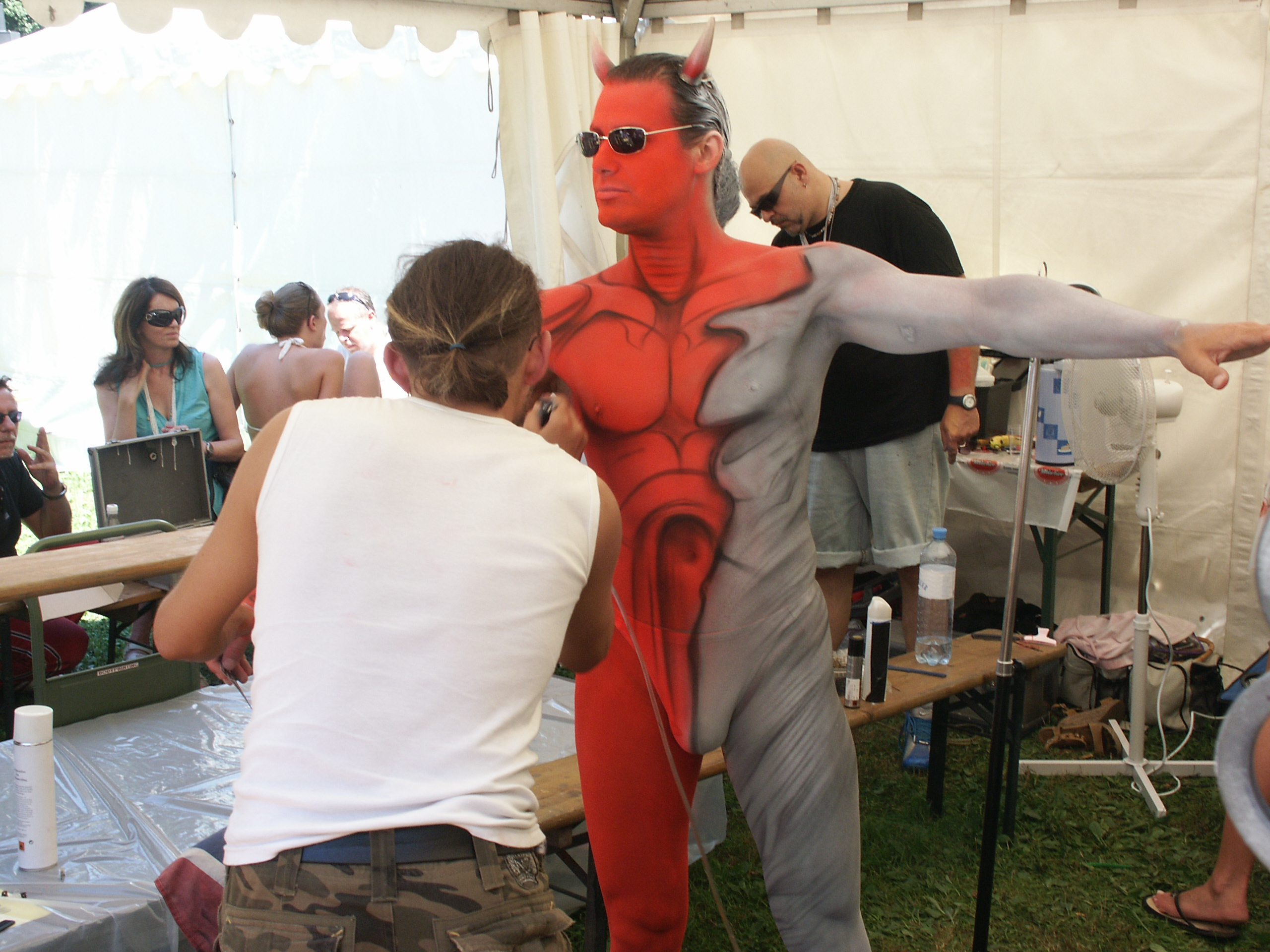
Artist at work (2006)

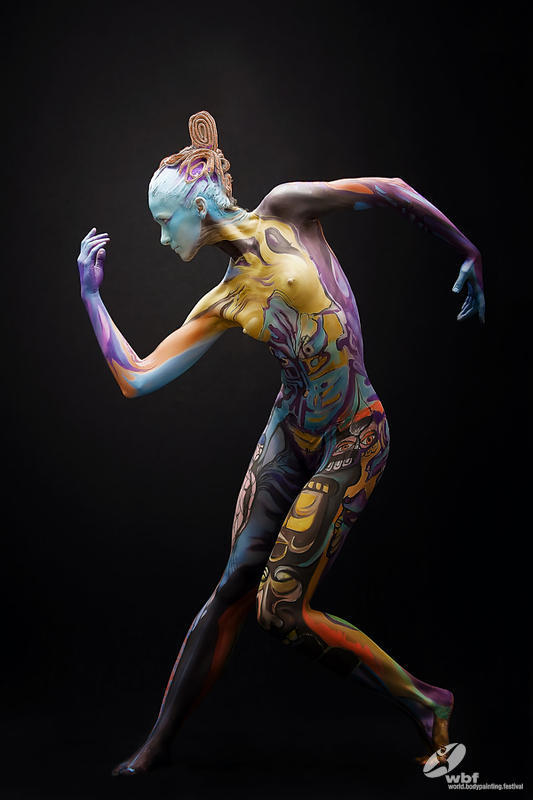
Artist Agnieska Glinska (2011)

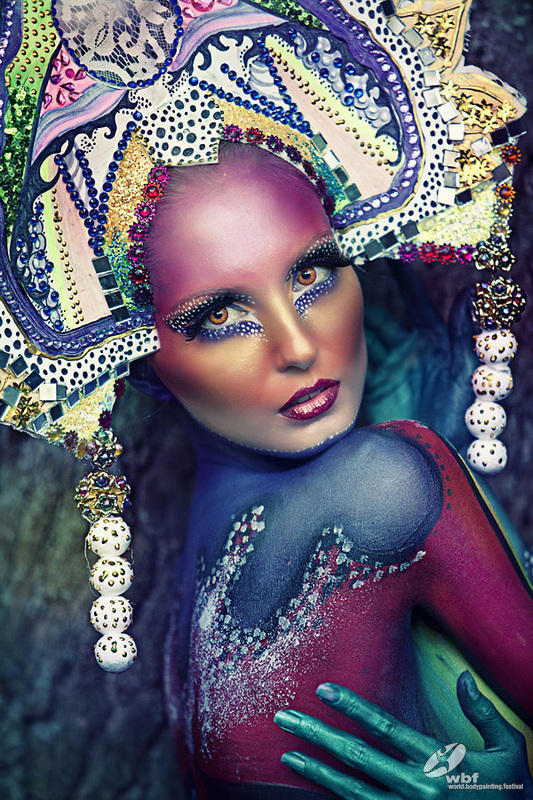
Artist Einat Dan (2012)
