= National Voluntary Organizations Active in Disaster =

- Formation: 1970
- Type: NGO
- Headquarters: Washington, DC
- Region served: USA
- Website: http://www.nvoad.org

The National Voluntary Organizations Active in Disaster (National VOAD, or NVOAD) is a coalition of the major national voluntary organizations in the United States that have made disaster-related work a priority. National VOAD member agencies provide skilled direct services along the continuum from disaster prevention and preparation to response, recovery, and mitigation. NVOAD is the only nationwide organization of VOAD members in the United States.

== History ==
National VOAD was founded in 1970 in response to the challenges many disaster organizations experienced following Hurricane Camille, which hit the Gulf Coast in August 1969.

Prior to the founding of National VOAD, numerous organizations served disaster victims independently of one another. These included both government and the private, nonprofit sector. As a result, help came to the disaster victim haphazardly as various organizations assisted in specific ways. Unnecessary duplication of effort often occurred, while at the same time, other needs were not met. People who wanted to volunteer to help their neighbors affected by disaster were often frustrated by the variety of organizations in some areas of service and the total lack of opportunities to serve other needs. Further, there was only limited availability of training for potential volunteers. Information for victims on services during disasters was woefully inadequate. Likewise, communication among voluntary disaster agencies was very limited and coordination of services was negligible. In fact, mechanisms for this were non-existent.

The seven founding organizations met on July 15, 1970 in the American Red Cross headquarters to establish a unified response to national disasters, committing to fostering the 4Cs—cooperation, communication, coordination, and collaboration — in order to better serve people impacted by disasters. In attendance were the Seventh-day Adventist Church, Southern Baptist Convention, Mennonite Disaster Service, St. Vincent de Paul Society, Christian Reformed World Relief Committee, the National Disaster Relief Office of the Roman Catholic Church, and the American Red Cross. Annual meetings were held from 1971 onward, and National VOAD was established in 1975.

National VOAD is a leader and voice for the nonprofit organizations and volunteers that work in all phases of disaster — preparedness, response, relief, recovery, and mitigation. National VOAD is the primary point of contact for voluntary organization in the National Response Coordination Center (at Federal Emergency Management Agency (FEMA) headquarters) and is a signatory to the National Response Plan.

Since the initial seven founding organizations convened in 1970, National VOAD's membership has grown to 110 Members total, including 55 National Member organizations and 55 State/Territory Members.

In 2010, FEMA and National VOAD signed a Memorandum of Understanding (MOU) with each other to broaden the communication and coordination between FEMA and National VOAD’s Members.

== National members ==
- Adventist Community Services
- All Hands Volunteers
- American Baptist Men
- American Radio Relay League
- American Red Cross
- Brethren Disaster Ministries
- Catholic Charities, USA
- Christian Disaster Response International
- Christian Reformed World Relief Committee
- Church World Service
- Churches of Scientology Disaster Response www.csdr-us.org (also known as Volunteer Ministers)
- City Team Ministries
- Convoy of Hope
- Episcopal Relief and Development
- Feeding America (Formerly America's Second Harvest)
- Feed the Children
- Habitat for Humanity International
- Headwaters Relief Organization
- Hope Coalition America
- The Humane Society of the United States
- International Aid
- International Critical Incident Stress Foundation
- International Organization for Victim Assistance
- International Relief and Development
- International Relief Friendship Foundation
- Jewish Federations of North America
- Latter-Day Saint Charities (also known as Mormon Helping Hands)
- Lutheran Disaster Response
- Mennonite Disaster Service
- Mercy Medical Airlift/Angel Flight America
- National Association of Jewish Chaplains
- National Organization for Victim Assistance
- Nazarene Disaster Response
- Noah's Wish - Animal Disaster Response
- Operation Blessing
- Presbyterian Disaster Assistance
- REACT International
- The Salvation Army
- Samaritan’s Purse
- Save the Children
- Society of St. Vincent de Paul
- Southern Baptist Convention –North American Mission Board
- Taiwan Buddhist Tzu Chi Foundation USA
- Team Rubicon
- United Church of Christ –Wider Church Ministries
- United Methodist Committee on Relief (UMCOR)
- United Way Worldwide
- Volunteers of America
- World Vision
