= Lucia Dvorská =

Slovak model

- Born: 14 July 1988 (age 38); Bratislava, Slovakia
- Spouse: Daniel Rubini
- Children: 3
- Modeling information
- Height: 5 ft 9 in (1.75 m)
- Hair color: Brown
- Eye color: Blue

Lucia Dvorská Rubini (born 14 July 1988) is a Slovak model who appeared in the 2009 Sports Illustrated Swimsuit Issue.

== Biography ==
Lucia Dvorská was born in Bratislava on 14 July 1988. Her mother and grandmother both modelled. She grew up in a village in western Slovakia, Zohor. Despite appearing in a television commercial as a child, she didn't start modeling until age 16.

=== Modelling career ===
Dvorská was a contestant on the 2007 reality television show, A Model Life, hosted by Petra Němcová on TLC and as a result she won a $100 000 contract with "Next" Agency. Dvorská was a beauty pageant titleholder as the 2000 Little Miss World.

In 2009 she became the first Slovak model featured in Sports Illustrated Swimsuit Issue.

== Personal life ==
Dvorská has three children with her Brazilian-born husband Rubini Rubini. After 12 years if Brazil, the family relocated to Slovakia in 2024.
