= CEAS =

CEAS is an abbreviation that may stand for: (in alphabetic order)

== In English ==
- Centre for East Asian Studies or Center for East Asian Studies, a common name for academic hubs focusing on East Asian studies at universities worldwide
- Common European Asylum System
- Council of European Aerospace Societies
- Conference on Email and Anti-Spam
- Corporate Emergency Access System
- Council of European Aerospace Societies
- N2-(2-carboxyethyl)arginine synthase, an enzyme
- Centre for European Agricultural Studies at Wye College

== In French ==
- Centre écologique Albert Schweitzer a non-governmental Swiss organisation for humanitarian and development aid
- Centre d’étude et d’Action Sociales d’Alsace
