= Responder =

Responder may refer to the following:

- Certified first responder, a person who has received certification in providing pre-hospital care during emergencies
- Community first responder, a local area first responder
- Second responder, a worker who operates during recovery following manmade and natural disasters
- The Responder, a British police drama series set in Liverpool
- Wilderness first responder, an expert who is trained to respond to emergency situations in remote settings
- "Responder", a song by Gen Hoshino from the 2023 EP Lighthouse
