= VOAD =

VOAD (Voluntary Organizations Active in Disasters) means one or coalition of (usually not-for-profit) Second Responder organizations in the United States. These groups voluntarily help survivors after a disaster. VOAD members cannot activate, direct, or supervise one another without a special agreement (such as a MOU). The term "VOAD" is ambiguous, with at least five meanings:

1. VOAD Movement
2. VOAD Chapters
3. Informal VOAD Networks
4. VOAD Member Organizations
5. Any Voluntary Organization(s) Active in a Disaster

== VOAD Movement (Meaning #1) ==
The concept of a "VOAD Movement" is found in the National Voluntary Organizations Active in Disaster (NVOAD) Strategic Plan. It is different from the National VOAD Organization, but not defined.

Generally, a disaster relief organization that strives for the ideals of the 4Cs—communication, coordination, collaboration, and cooperation — and the NVOAD Points of Consensus could be considered part of the VOAD Movement. The Points of Consensus are written by various NVOAD committees on many disaster-related subjects including Disaster Spiritual Care; Clean Up, Repair and Rebuild; and Volunteer Management.

== VOAD Chapters (Meaning #2) ==
The next (and perhaps most common) usage of "VOAD" is to refer to one of hundreds of chapters and organizations that explicitly refer to themselves as a "VOAD." There are National, Multi-state, State, County, Community, and City VOAD chapters. With few exceptions, VOAD chapters are not considered "operational" entities; that is, while they convene and coordinate various disaster-response organizations, they do not have authority to direct the actions of any of its members. Local chapters may (but need not) have a formal affiliation with a parent chapter, up to the National level. Because VOADs are all voluntary, the formality, legal structure and activity of individual chapters varies widely.

In this Meaning, proper usage of "VOAD" would include, "The Seventh-day Adventists are a member of the Colorado VOAD," where "VOAD" refers to the Colorado chapter of VOAD.

=== National VOAD ===
National Voluntary Organizations Active in Disaster is the only nationwide VOAD organization in the United States, whose members tend to be large VOAD organizations (see Meaning #4 below) and State VOAD Chapters.

=== Multi-state VOADs ===
Multi-state VOADs convene multiple state VOAD Chapters around common interests such as geography, population density, shared culture, or shared threat. These VOAD chapters promote the principles of the VOAD Movement (Meaning #1), improve interstate relationships, promote best practices, or pool resources. Multi-state VOADs include:

- Mountain West VOAD (MWVOAD): Comprises Washington, Oregon, Idaho, Montana, North Dakota, South Dakota, Colorado, Wyoming, Utah, Nevada, New Mexico, Nebraska, and Alaska.
- New England VOAD: is an informal collaboration including Maine, Vermont, New Hampshire, Massachusetts, Connecticut, and Rhode Island.
- Tri-State VOAD: Comprised Mississippi, Louisiana, and Alabama, but is no longer active.

=== Regional, County, Community, and City VOADs ===
Regional, county, and city VOADs are too numerous to list.

- Regional VOADs are VOADs that cover a large region of a state, or multiple counties.
- County VOADs, typically serve one county, and often have close relationships with county emergency management personnel.
- Community COADs tend to be coalitions of community organizations that may or may not formally identify with the VOAD movement. In contrast to County or Regional VOADs, COADs are more likely to be led by a government agency, like a county emergency management department. They may or may not adopt the Points of Consensus.
- Some larger municipalities have their own city VOADs, which operate similarly to a county VOAD.

Locally, the makeup, names and definitions of these types of entities are fluid and sometimes interchangeable. The difference between a Regional or County VOAD and a COAD is a matter of debate; but generally a local coalition that:

- adopts the Points of Consensus,
- has a relationship with a State VOAD chapter, and
- whose leadership comprises voluntary organizations (rather than government employees)

is considered a VOAD, rather than a COAD.

To illustrate the relationship among different chapter types, New York has a State VOAD, Regional VOADs, City VOADs, and Community COADs. New York VOAD is the state chapter, while Long Island VOAD is a Regional VOAD. Broome County COAD is a Community COAD and New York City VOAD is a City VOAD. In the vast majority of cases, VOADs at different levels (even in the same state) coordinate but operate independently of one another.

=== Voluntary Nature and Membership ===
VOAD organizations (Meaning #4) are "voluntary" in that they are generally not under any legal obligation to assist survivors after a disaster. Although most VOAD organizations rely on volunteers to perform their missions, an organization need not have volunteers to be voluntary. For example, the American Red Cross is composed of paid staff and volunteers, all of whom respond after a disaster.

Membership in VOAD chapters (Meaning #2) is generally limited to organizations, though some occasionally seek participation from individuals with special qualifications. Membership requirements vary widely from chapter to chapter. Some VOADs require dues, while others don't. Some require an application, while mere presence at others constitutes de facto membership. A few allow government entities, businesses, educational institutions, foundations, and corporations to be full voting members, while most treat them as non-voting "partners." The largest constituency of VOAD Members are faith-based organizations, with major contributions from non-faith-based organizations such as the American Red Cross, Team Rubicon, the United Way, 2-1-1s, etc.

Membership and participation in chapters tends to increase during times of response and recovery, and wane between disasters.

== Informal VOAD Networks (Meaning #3) ==
The third meaning of the term "VOAD" refers to the broad informal, local network of voluntary organizations that assist in disaster recovery. These larger informal coalitions extend deep into the local community to include more traditional community non-profits, connections with local businesses, churches, etc. Such organizations may or may not be formally affiliated with a VOAD Chapter (Meaning #2). For example, during the Long Term Recovery phase, an Unmet Needs Committee of a Long Term Recovery Group may have special relationships with local businesses or non-profit organizations who donate goods or services to clients. These businesses and non-profit organizations do not identify themselves as VOADs (Meaning #4) or formally affiliate with a VOAD chapter (Meaning #2), but they are a part of the larger VOAD network (Meaning #3).

For most VOAD Member Organizations (Meaning #4), the primary value of VOAD (Meanings #1-3) participation is access to enhance relationships. During a disaster, the value of relationships, access to resources, and pre-established roles and responsibilities cannot be overstated.

== VOAD Member Organizations (Meaning #4) ==
The next concept of "VOAD" refers to individual member organizations. For example, while Colorado VOAD is a "VOAD" in the second sense, above, the American Red Cross is also itself a Voluntary Organization Active in Disasters, or a VOAD. Thus, the following two sentences refer to "VOAD" in two senses: "LDS Charities is a VOAD." (Meaning #4) "LDS Charities is a member of Texas VOAD." (Meaning #2)

== Any Voluntary Organization(s) Active in a Disaster (Meaning #5) ==
Finally, a voluntary organization active in a disaster may include literally any organization, formal group, or informal community coalition that forms for the purpose of disaster response, even if they do not call themselves a "VOAD." For example, a local church at the epicenter of a disaster, a well-organized Facebook group, or an emergent organization that organizes Spontaneous Unaffiliated Volunteers, is a VOAD under this definition.

== Activation After a Disaster ==
VOAD chapters (Meaning #2) at all levels begin coordinating and communicating with their member organizations (Meaning #4) very soon after a disaster, often using conference calls or webinars. A typical call might include reports from state or local emergency managers, the National Weather Service, a roll call of and reports from responding VOADs (Meaning #4). One purpose of this call is to discourage VOADs (Meanings #3, 4 & 5) from "self-deploying," or attempting to assist the community in an uncoordinated manner. While in one sense, VOADs (Meanings #3, 4 & 5) always and only self-deploy (i.e., no other organization has ecclesiastical or operational authority to order another organization to deploy or demobilize), uncoordinated responses cause confusion among first responders, emergency managers, and members of the community. Further, an uncoordinated response can produce inefficient resource deployment and duplication of efforts.

The coordination calls are often daily in the first week or two, then gradually taper in frequency to weekly. In the United States, VOAD organizations (Meanings #4 & 5) often specialize in one or a few activities and services, and typically activate during one primary phase. As the response phase ends and the long-term recovery phase begins, responsibility for ongoing work often shifts to Long Term Recovery Groups/Committees (LTRGs) and Unmet Needs Committees. LTRGs and Unmet Needs committees may be a subcommittee of the local VOAD chapter (Meaning #2) or independent of the VOAD chapter. LTRGs and Unmet Needs committees almost always form on the local and county levels, tend to be under-resourced, and operate for 3-12 years depending on the severity of the disaster and available resources.
