= All Hands and Hearts =

U.S. nonprofit organization

All Hands & Hearts
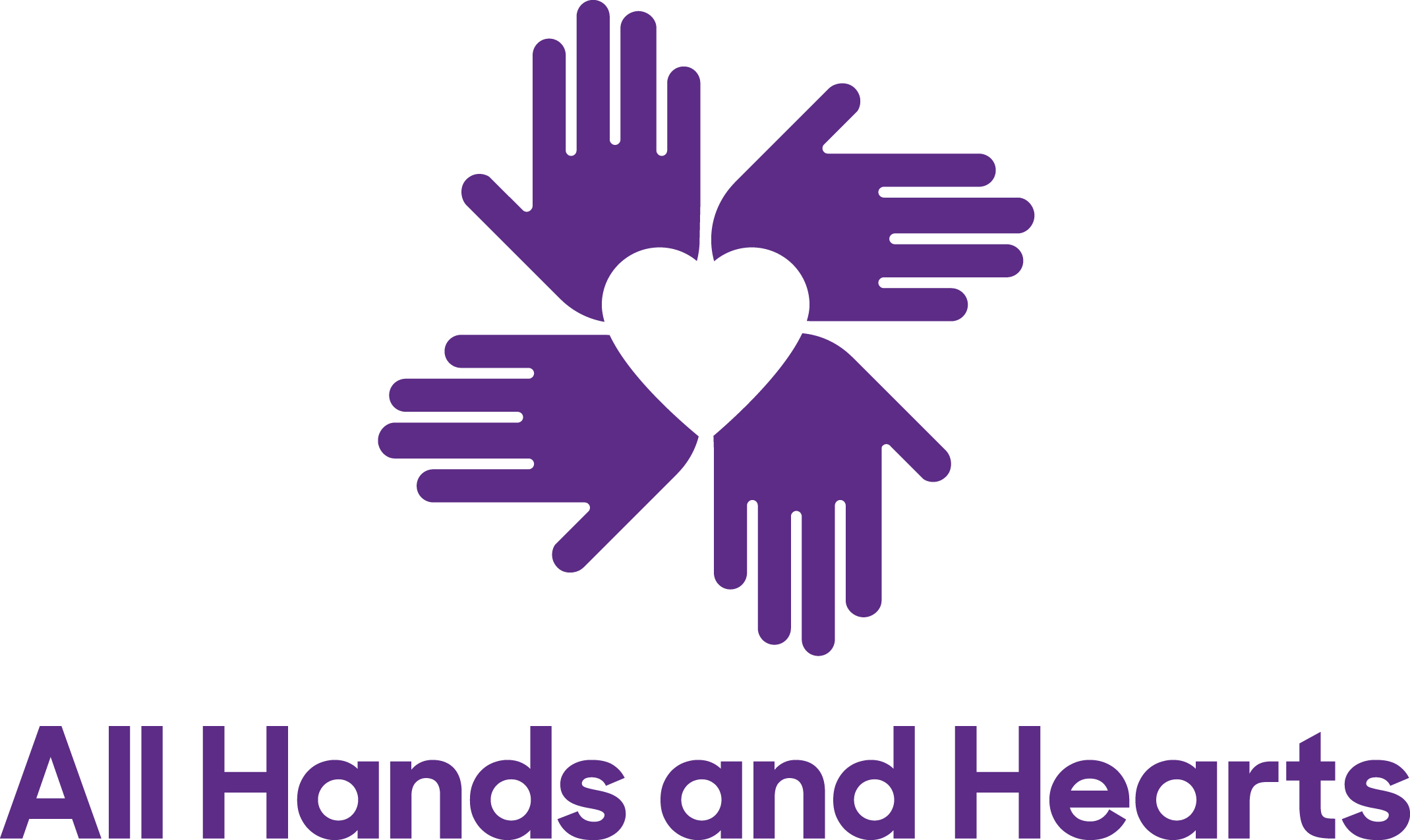
- AH&H Logo
- Predecessor: All Hands Volunteers, Happy Hearts Fund
- Successor: All Hands and Hearts
- Founded: 2005
- Founder: David Campbell, Petra Němcová
- Type: 501(c)(3) non-profit organization
- Tax ID no.: US Tax ID #20-3414952 / UK charity number 1139938
- Region served: Worldwide
- Services: Humanitarian Response
- Key people: Mike Pehl, Chair of the Board of Directors, Petra Němcová, Vice Chair and Co-founder, Nate Mook, Chief Executive Officer
- Revenue: $3,929,567 (2013) $7,278,917 (2017) $24,293,917 (2018) $16.4M (2023)
- Expenses: $2,913,607 (2013) $6,119,128 (2017) $15,506,552 (2018) $13.5M (2023)
- Website: allhandsandhearts.org
- Formerly called: Hands On Disaster Response, All Hands Volunteers

All Hands & Hearts (AH&H) is a U.S. 501(c)(3) nonprofit organization. The organization's current structure formed in late 2017, when two existing nonprofits, All Hands Volunteers and Happy Hearts Fund, merged to become All Hands & Hearts. All Hands and Hearts is based in Mattapoisett, Massachusetts.

== History ==
All Hands & Hearts was founded in 2017 with the merger of All Hands Volunteers and Happy Hearts Fund.

In 2018, All Hands And Hearts were ranked #1 on the Classy 100, topping a list of fastest-growing NGO's. Since 2014, All Hands and Hearts have been awarded a 4-star rating by Charity Navigator, and AHAH is in the top 10% of all nonprofits evaluated for financial and operational efficiency.

When establishing a presence at a new location following a major disaster, the organization first conducts an assessment, working with local community leadership to establish an effective and sustainable base.

== Programs ==
=== Hurricane Michael ===
Following 2018's Hurricane Michael, volunteers worked in Florida's Bay and Calhoun Counties, with the majority of work focused in the vicinity of Youngstown, Florida. Work undertaken included tree work, debris removal and residential flood cleanup. As needs of the community change, the organization's focus has shifted to gutting homes.

=== Hurricane Harvey ===
In Texas, the organization responded to the 2017 Hurricane Harvey. During the response phase, AHAH completed an impactful 16-week program in Coastal Bend and 18-week program in Houston. Since February 2018, the nonprofit's commitment to the recovery effort has concentrated on interior repair.

=== Hurricane Florence ===
In North and South Carolina, volunteers worked in mold remediation and cleanup following Hurricane Florence. Work expanded to include repairs on qualifying homes in Pamlico County and Craven County.

=== Oaxaca earthquake recovery ===
On September 7, 2017, one of the most lethal earthquakes in Mexican history hit close to the southern state of Chiapas, with a devastating magnitude of 8.2. Just 12 days later and a few hundred miles away, a 7.1 magnitude quake rocked central Mexico, toppling buildings, breaking gas mains, knocking out electricity and sparking fires across Mexico City and other towns in central Mexico. All Hands and Hearts' ongoing presence in Mexico following the devastating earthquakes of 2017 continue with an earthquake recovery program opening in Oaxaca in January 2019. The program is focused on assisting the Celso Muñoz Primary School and Jardin De Niños 13 De Septiembre Preschool, within the state of Oaxaca. Work includes rebuilding and retrofitting classrooms in both schools, along with a number of other school facilities including a library. The completion of both schools will ensure students have safe and disaster-resilient learning spaces.

=== Hurricane Irma ===
Response in 2017 to Hurricane Irma in the U.S. Virgin Islands required the evacuation of workers. Then came Hurricane Maria, which struck the islands on September 20. Volunteer teams on St. Thomas worked at 12 schools, and on critical roofing repairs. On the St. John, volunteers completed eleven rebuild sites. Work continued in 2019.

All Hands and Hearts worked in Puerto Rico starting in January 2018, responding to the lack of sanitation, potable water and power outages. Volunteers worked to clear debris, muck and clear facilities, homes and infrastructure, assist in sanitation work, gutting damaged areas and preparing sites for rebuild and repair projects. To date over 1,200 individual jobs have been completed with over 24,000 volunteer hours logged.

=== Nepal earthquake response ===
On April 25, 2015, a 7.8 earthquake hit Nepal near the capital city of Kathmandu; the worst of its kind in more than 80 years. More than 9,000 people lost their lives, a further 23,000 were injured, and there was major destruction of homes and infrastructure. The earthquake resulted in more than 5,000 schools being damaged or completely destroyed. On May 12, 2015, a second 7.3 earthquake struck the country, causing further devastation and loss of lives. 72 hours after the first earthquake, All Hands and Hearts was on the ground assisting the affected communities.

All Hands and Heart's Nepal Earthquake Recovery program reopened in October following the 2018 monsoon season with volunteers rebuilding and repairing schools in the Sindhuli district. The program focused on rebuilding the Shree Ma Vii School, the Shree Uccha Ma Vii School and the Saraswati school. Following the completion of work on the Uccha Ma Vii school, a fourth school was taken on: Jana Jagriti Secondary School. Efforts are focused on providing disaster-resilient classrooms, appropriate toilets and installing water filtration systems for safe drinking water.

== Closed programs ==
=== 2018 ===
In September 2017, Hurricane Maria devastated large areas of Dominica. It was reported that over 90% of structures on the island suffered damage, with widespread loss of electricity and basic facilities. In response, All Hands and Hearts launched a relief program in April 2018, focused on restoring education to the children of Dominica, in particular the rebuild of the Paix Bouche Primary School. When completed, the school is expected to serve 78 students, with over 200 projected over the next 10 years. The school is also envisioned to provide shelter against future storms, both for students and the local community.

Hurricanes Irma and Maria bombarded the British Virgin Islands in September 2017. The islands were subjected to some of the strongest winds in recorded history, decimating the beautiful islands and causing extensive damage to homes, schools, community facilities and utilities across the islands. All Hands and Hearts launched a program help impacted children on the island of Tortola. A number of schools and care facilities were outlined as needing immediate support, with volunteers helping to clear debris and prepare sites for rebuilds. As the program has progressed through 2018, community programs have been started, with several homes cleared of debris and made safe.

In June 2018, heavy tropical rainfall hit the south Texas coastline, causing severe flash floods and widespread disruption. All Hands and Hearts assessed the ongoing situation and in response set up an immediate response program in Hidalgo county. The volunteer team are currently working with local communities to muck and gut homes, clear debris and assist in sanitation and relief in the affected areas.

On September 19, 2017, a magnitude 7.1 earthquake struck central Mexico. Widespread destruction and disruption occurred with thousands of homes, school and community buildings either destroyed or damaged. in March 2018, All Hands and Hearts opened a program in Morelos with the goal of restoring education to children in the region. The organization worked alongside Happy Hearts Fund Mexico to reconstruct the Narciso Mendoza Primary school, completed in September 2018. Additionally, work at the Vicente Guerrero Primary School was completed in October 2018. The completion of both schools ensured that students have a safe, disaster-resilient school long after the end of the program.

=== 2017 ===
In March 2017, All Hands and Hearts launched a relief program in Peru in response to the widespread and devastating flooding which had affected much of the country since late 2016. A program was launched in the eastern area of Peru, in the district of Piura Province. Volunteers worked to remove mud and debris from homes and schools, some of which were found to be almost entirely filled with mud. In August 2017, All Hands and Hearts began the next stage of the program, to rebuild a number of schools, the first of which has since been completed. Further projects are continuing in Yapatera, including school builds, English lessons, community outreach programs and schemes focused on empowering women in the local area. An estimated 2,000 students have been returned to education, with over 3,000 people impacted as a result of the program.

In September 2017, Hurricanes Maria and Irma devastated large areas of the Caribbean including the British and US Virgin Islands, Puerto Rico and Dominica leading to widespread damage, loss of electricity and basic facilities. All Hands and Hearts began a response program in St Thomas that month and continued to monitor the situation elsewhere during the ongoing hurricane season. Programs were launched in the British Virgin Islands, Puerto Rico, St. John, and Dominica in 2018.

All Hands and Hearts' ongoing presence in Nepal resumed following the end of monsoon season in October 2017. Efforts were centered on retrofitting and upgrading school buildings and facilities, alongside one full rebuild. By the time the program closed at the start of the monsoon season in May 2018, the Jalpa Devi, Kalikasaran, Nibugan, Manakamana and Dhauleshwori schools were completed, ensuring children have disaster-resilient facilities, including WaSH stations. Alongside the response and recovery work, a number of community projects were run, including language lessons and the training of female masons.

=== 2016 ===
In January 2016, winter storms resulted in several tornadoes and severe flooding affecting St Louis, Missouri. All Hands and Hearts responded to the urgent need for debris removal, sanitation and clearing of damaged infrastructure.

In August 2016, heavy flooding severely affected the state of Louisiana. Extremely heavy rainfall resulted in flash flood warnings and the destruction or damage of over 60,000 homes, displacing over 8,000 people. All Hands and Hearts launched a relief program on August 18, focusing on clearing debris, assisting in sanitation projects and removing flood damaged structures. Efforts were centered in Denham Springs where 90% of homes and business were affected. Volunteer teams also worked in the Baton Rouge area.

The ongoing earthquake relief program in Nepal continued to be heavily active throughout 2016, with a number of school projects being completed in Nuwako and Kathmandu.

In October 2016, Hurricane Matthew struck the Caribbean and southern United States with North Carolina, Haiti and Florida being worst hit. Widespread flooding and storm damage was reported across much of the region, prompting a relief response to be launched on October 6, aimed at clearing debris, fallen trees, preparing rebuild sites and environmental cleanups Domestic efforts were centred in North Carolina and Florida.

=== 2015 ===
Two years after Superstorm Sandy, All Hands opened its third rebuild project in Brooklyn, New York, in January to help those whose homes were damaged by the hurricane. Similar to reconstruction on Staten Island, the work included minor framing, drywall installation, mudding and taping, and painting.

On April 25, a 7.8 earthquake struck Nepal, followed by a major 7.3 aftershock on May 12. Over 9,000 people were killed, with over 23,000 injured. Mass devastation to infrastructure, homes and further loss of life followed. All Hands and Hearts deployed a team of disaster response experts to help distribute goods and coordinate local volunteer efforts. Teams then began working in Kathmandu and Sindhupalchowk District clearing debris and demolishing unsafe structures. This work was followed by building temporary learning centers and homes. Since work began in 2015, All Hands and Hearts have led programs rebuilding eight schools throughout the Nuwakot, Sindhupalchowk, Thulo and Kathmandu regions, directly impacting around 8,000 children. Over 20,000 people have been positively impacted over the course of the program's duration, which resumed in late 2017 following the monsoon season. All Hands and Hearts continue to be focused on returning school facilities to local children, with the latest project in Haibung nearing completion as of March 2018.

=== 2014 ===
On April 30, 2014, the All Hands Assessment Team arrived in Tupelo, Mississippi, two days after a tornado outbreak devastated the Southeast United States. All Hands chose to focus their response efforts in Itawamba County. Over the course of their response, 328 volunteers completed 84 jobs, which included basic debris removal, demolition of homes and barns, and significant salvage work. Less than two months later, a set of tornadoes struck the town of Pilger, Nebraska, destroying 80% of the town and injuring dozens. In our two weeks in Pilger, a total of 2,943 All Hands-coordinated volunteers completed work on 35 sites and removed debris in over three-quarters of the town. In August Detroit experienced severe flooding and the All Hands launched Project Detroit to help those in the area begin to recover from the damaging floods, and by project close had gutted and sanitized over 400 homes in the Detroit metro area.

As cleanup after Typhoon Yolanda moved toward completion in the Philippines, All Hands shifted their focus towards long-term recovery, concentrating on building permanent homes in both of the cities of Ormoc and Tacloban. For this program Project Leyte designed 40 two-story disaster resilient homes in order to focus on building upwards in a community where space for homes is limited. Typhoon Hagupit struck the area late in the year, delaying construction activities in Tacloban. The construction team helped both during the preparation and immediate response phases. Immediately following Typhoon Hagupit, the AHV Disaster Assessment Response Team (DART) spent six days on the island of Samar, which bore the brunt of the typhoon assessing the island. All Hands found a village, Calampong, where the organization began a traditional disaster cleanup, clearing fallen trees and debris, and deconstructing ruined homes.

=== 2013 ===
In 2013, the organization conducted the second phase of their response to Typhoon Sendong, building 88 new permanent homes for the victims of the storm. In May, they set up a rapid response in the Rancho Brazos community in Granbury, Texas, following a tornado in that area. Immediately afterward, they moved to Oklahoma, to aid in restorations after more tornadoes had hit in the areas of Moore and El Reno. In September 2013, the group set up an operation in Northeast Colorado following massive flooding. They organized volunteer teams, helping residents and business owners clear debris and salvage belongings, as well as helping farmers clear debris from their fields.

In October, the group responded to a 7.2 earthquake in the island province of Bohol, Philippines. The group performed debris removal and salvage. While the project in Bohol continued, the group set up a second response site on the nearby Island of Leyte in response to Typhoon Yolanda. Volunteers on Leyte worked to demolish damaged structures and deliver food to rural residents. At the same time, the group set up a stateside response project in Washington, Illinois, following a series of tornadoes in November 2013. FEMA had denied aid to the area, saying that infrastructure damage after the storms was not severe enough to warrant federal help.

=== 2012 ===
Following the addition of teaching programs in Leogane, All Hands concluded their presence in Leogane. They established a presence in the Philippines with Project Cagayan de Oro, aiding in the cleanup and rebuilding efforts following Typhoon Sendong which hit on December 16, 2011, leaving at least 1,200 people dead, and destroying 50,000 houses.

In March 2012, they provided aid in coordinating volunteers for debris removal in Morgan County, Kentucky, after an EF-3 tornado caused a large amount of damage and killed six. Following the June flooding of Duluth, Minnesota, the group aided in the restoration efforts, establishing a volunteer center where efforts could be coordinated, and flood victims could be matched with volunteers.

Following Hurricane Isaac, the group returned to the Mississippi Gulf Coast to provide hurricane recovery aid in the same region where HandsOnUSA had been formed to aid in the Katrina recovery efforts, providing cleanup and home repairs. The same season, they were situated on Staten Island and Long Island following Hurricane Sandy, gutting houses and aiding in cleanup and restorative efforts. Volunteers in Long Beach, Long Island slept on the second floor of a church during the restorative efforts, staying there for eight months.

=== 2011 ===
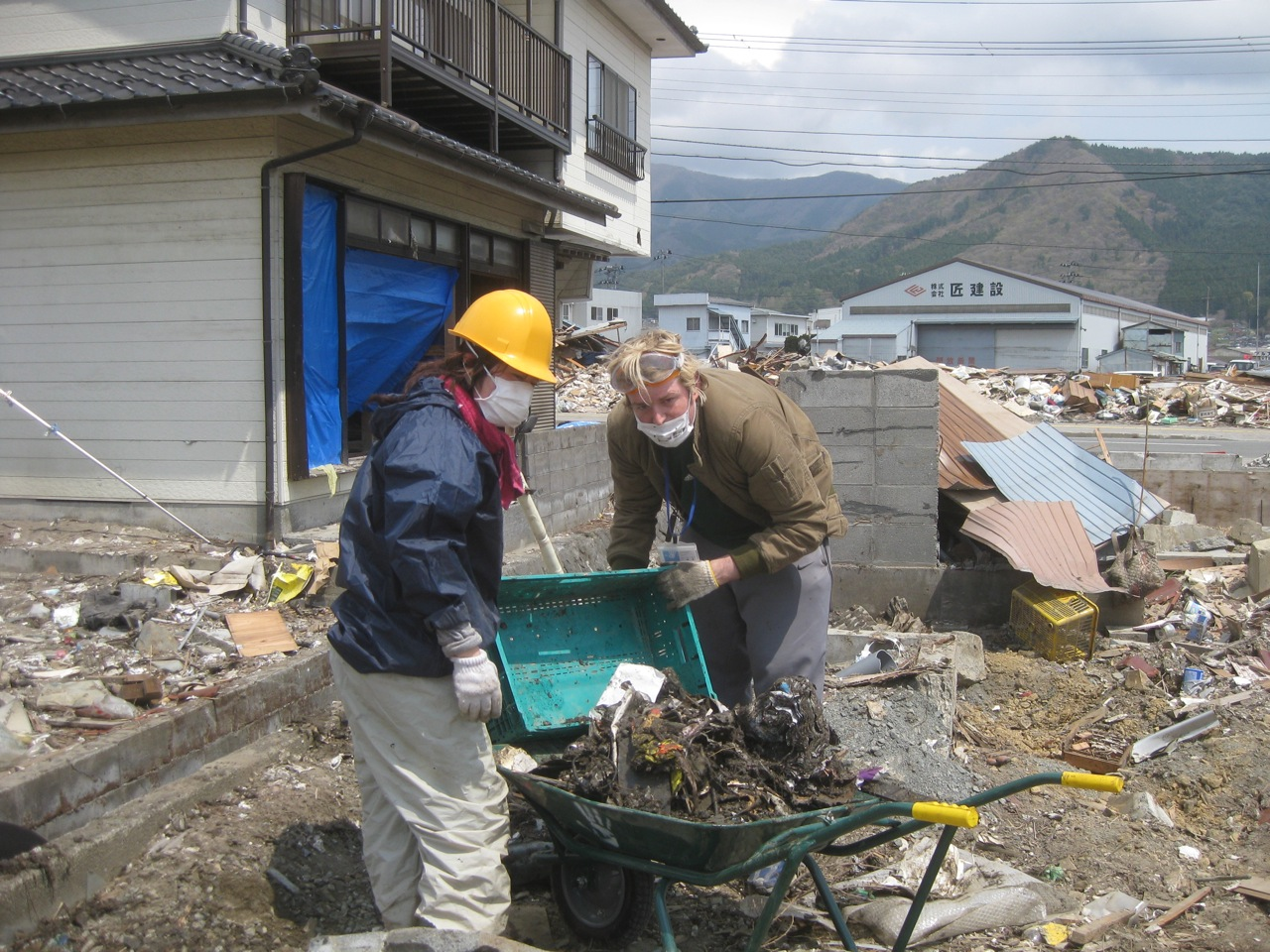
All Hands Volunteers clearing debris following the 2011 Japan earthquake

Relief efforts in Haiti continued in 2011, with the organization, now known as All Hands Volunteers (AHV), expanding to address the evolving needs of residents. One aspect of this involved the creation of a Biosand Filter Program to distribute water filters that kill pathogens and prevent the spread of waterborne diseases to Leogane and surrounding rural communities. Another was the creation of a Livelihoods program, which educated residents in business skills in order to increase their standard of living. They also collaborated with other relief agencies on the Vini Jwe project, which constructed a soccer field for the community Leogane, commemorating its completion with a tournament involving international aid organizations, Haitian league teams and members of the local community.

On March 11, 2011, a magnitude 9.1 earthquake struck off of the coast of Tohoku, Japan, triggering a devastating tsunami which struck the region. In response, The organization launched Project Tohoku, setting up operations in Rikuzentakata city and Ofunato city, Iwate Prefecture, where approximately 7,200 homes were badly damaged by the earthquake and tsunami. There, they worked with hundreds of volunteers to clear debris from homes, canals, and public areas and repaired houses.

All Hands also established relief efforts in the U.S., following tornadoes that struck in Alabama, Massachusetts and Missouri. A "Good Friday" EF-4 tornado struck St. Louis on Friday, April 22. AHV's debris clearance team spent four weeks, beginning in May, clearing trees from buildings. A longer-term effort began in May to help relocate families and to de-construct houses that had to be gutted prior to being rebuilt. Dozens of tornados struck Alabama on April 27 in a super outbreak which killed over 200 people. AHV responded to requests by the State and the Alabama branch of VOAD to provide inter-agency coordination services in support of the ongoing recovery efforts. Coordination of needs was enhanced by a strong 2-1-1 system. Direct volunteer efforts included tree removal, debris removal, and de-construction. AHV efforts concluded in mid-July. While the Alabama recovery was underway, Western Massachusetts was hit by multiple tornadoes on June 1. The Massachusetts Emergency Management Agency (MEMA) asked AHV to provide coordination services for volunteer agencies in the state. At the same time AHV partnered with United Way and using the 2-1-1 system provided field operations support throughout much of Western Massachusetts to match unaffiliated volunteers with agencies to assist in debris clean-up and roof and home repair.

AHV provided flood relief in Minot, North Dakota, where the June flooding of the Souris River forced 10,000 residents to flee and damaged more than 4,100 properties.

They were also in the Catskills following Hurricane Irene, cleaning up damaged buildings and clearing debris.

=== 2010 ===
On January 12, 2010, an earthquake that registered 7.0 on the Richter Scale struck Haiti, with a death toll that some estimates quoted as high as 300,000, with another 300,000 wounded and more than one million people left homeless. The first volunteer staff from HODR arrived on January 21 where, after networking with contacts from their previous efforts in Gonaives, they launched Project Leogane on February 3, 2010, with an emphasis on deconstruction and salvage, as well as in the building of transitional schools. In what would become the organization's longest running project, HODR would remain until 2012 (by which time they would be known as All Hands Volunteers).

HODR also returned to the Cedar Rapids, Iowa, area in April 2010, to aid in continued rebuilding following the 2008 flood, with the help of a $15,000 donation from the Greater Cedar Rapids Home Builders Association to pay for tools and supplies.

The group aided with flood recovery coordination for three U.S. incidents, establishing operations in Rhode Island, Tennessee and Iowa. Rhode Island received up to 15 in (380 mm) of rain in late March and subsequently suffered severe flooding. HODR responded to a request by the state branch of VOAD and the state's emergency management agency to establish and staff an inter-agency recovery coordination center (RCC). The center continued providing coordination until early May. As the Rhode Island project concluded, both Middle and West Tennessee experienced record rainfall and suffered exceptional flooding. Similar to the Rhode Island project, HODR helped optimize an RCC in Antioch, Tennessee, that subsequently handled over a thousand inter-agency requests for assistance. In August, the Skunk River flooded parts of southern Iowa. Especially devastated was the city of Colfax in Jasper County. HODR teams helped with clean-up and recovery activities plus assisting in inter-agency coordination for Colfax and Jasper County.

=== 2009 ===
In April 2009, HODR set up operations in Mena, Arkansas, to remove debris and downed trees after an EF3 tornado hit the town, damaging more than 600 homes and affecting thousands of people.

A coordination team was deployed to Gowanda, New York, following the August 9–10, 2009 flash flooding in Cattaraugus County, where they set up a recovery center at the Gowanda Fire Department to connect agencies with volunteers seeking to help in flood recovery in the area.

In October, the group opened Project Sungai Geringging after Western Sumatra was hit by a 7.9 magnitude earthquake on September 30. The project operated until April 2010, demolishing damaged structures and salvaging reusable materials to aid in rebuilding.

=== 2008 ===
In February, the organization established a three-week operation in Gassville, Arkansas, to aid in the cleanup after an EF2 tornado, one of the Super Tuesday tornados, struck the town destroying 79 homes. They then moved to Newton County, Missouri, to aid with the recovery after the Picher/Neosho tornado on May 10 hit the county, destroying almost 200 houses and killing 18.

In June 2008, eastern Iowa was hit with massive flooding, forcing the evacuation of several cities, including Palo and Cedar Rapids. HODR established Project Cedar Rapids, bringing over 2,000 volunteers to the area during its four-month deployment. Volunteers traveled door to door, assisting residents with clean up.

HODR's final project in 2008 took place in Gonaives, Haiti, after a series of hurricanes hit the area, where the group aided in mud removal and the rebuilding of the city's infrastructure, including the cleaning and painting of the school and medical clinic.

=== 2007 ===
The organization's next project took place in Pisco, Peru, providing aid following the 2007 Peru earthquake. The group's final project in 2007 was in Rayenda, Bangladesh, following Cyclone Sidr, where they aided in restoration with a group of 50 volunteers from 10 different countries.

=== 2006 ===
On May 27, 2006, an earthquake measuring 6.3 on the Richter scale struck the Yogyakarta region in Java, Indonesia. HODR established a base in the village of Sawit, where volunteers participated in demolition and debris removal.

In November 2006, Typhoon Durian (Reming) struck the Philippines, resulting in extensive damage and loss of life. HODR established a base in the township of Santo Domingo, Albay, in January 2007, assisting with rebuilding and cleanup.

== Leadership ==
- David Campbell, Chair and Co-founder – Formerly the CEO of Computer Task Group (CTG) and Xpedior, and President of BBN Technologies, Campbell came up with the idea of the business model surrounding All Hands while volunteering in Thailand in the aftermath of the 2004 Sumatran tsunami, using it to first launch Hands On Thailand and making it the structure for the evolution of the organization. Campbell served as the organization's executive director until 2013, when Erik Dyson was named as the new director.
- Petra Němcová, Vice Chair – A Czech model, television host and philanthropist who founded the Happy Hearts Fund in 2005 following her personal experiences during the 2004 Boxing Day Tsunami. In addition to her successful career, Němcová remains heavily involved in promoting global awareness of disaster response, being recognised for her work with the Happy hearts Fund as well as being appointed by the UNISDR as a Disaster Risk Reduction Champion and Tsunami Awareness Advocate in 2017.
- Erik Dyson, Executive Director – Previously the senior vice president of Latin America for GTECH Corp, Dyson has also worked in commercial real estate in the Boston area, and served for three years in El Salvador and Costa Rica with Habitat for Humanity International. He holds an MBA in Business Administration from the Harvard Business School.

== Awards and honors ==
- In 2005, Darius Monsef was given the key to the city of Biloxi, Mississippi by A.J. Holloway for his organization's work in the aftermath of Hurricane Katrina.
- In 2006, David Campbell was named a Purpose Prize Fellow 2006 by Encore.org.
- In 2011, All Hands received an Innovator Award for the Best CRM Visionary/Use of Common Ground at the Convio Innovator Awards.
- In 2013, David Campbell was awarded with the Richard Cornuelle Award for Social Entrepreneurship.
- In 2014, All Hands received the National Voluntary Organizations Active in Disaster (NVOAD) Member of the Year Award.
- In 2014, Founder and Chairman- David Campbell was announced as Encore.org Purpose Prize Award winner
- In 2015, All Hands Volunteers wins Make a Difference A Day Award
- In 2015 All Hands Volunteers rank one of the top ten NGOs for Data Quality Award
- In 2015, David Campbell won the Points of Light Award
- In 2017, Petra was appointed by the UNISDR as a Disaster Risk Reduction Champion and Tsunami Awareness Advocate.
- In 2018, All Hands And Hearts were ranked #1 on the Classy 100, topping a list of fastest growing NGO's for 2017.
- In 2018, All Hands And Hearts were ranked as 4 stars by Charity Navigator, indicating exceptional financial and operational efficiency.
