= Petra Němcová =

Czech model, television host, and philanthropist

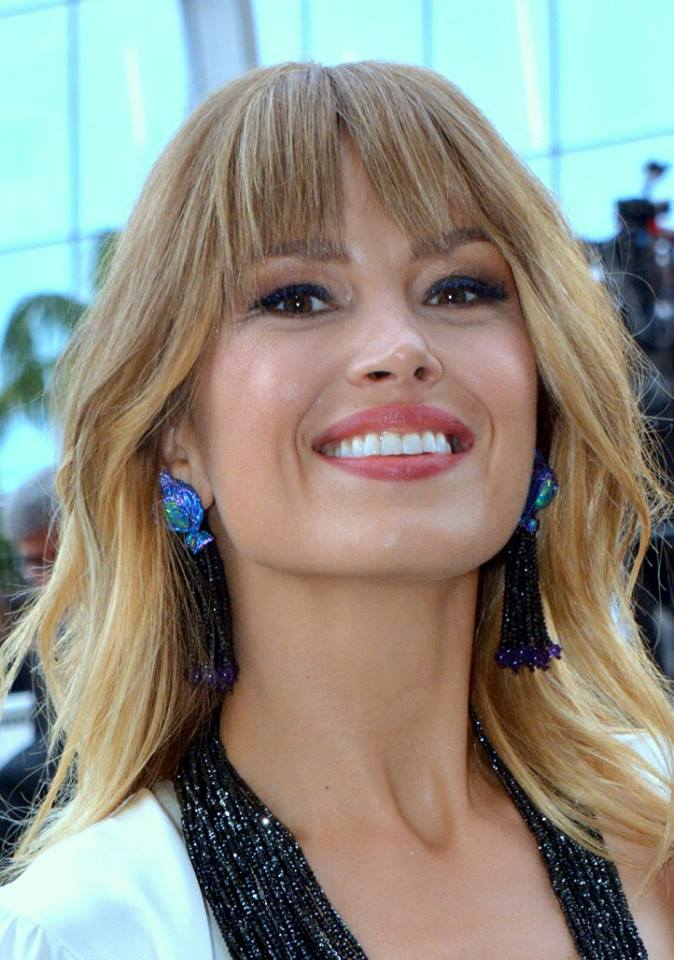
- Němcová in 2018
- Born: 24 June 1979 (age 47); Karviná, Czechoslovakia (now Czech Republic)
- Spouse: Benjamin Larretche (m. 2019)
- Children: 1
- Modelling information
- Height: 1.78 m (5 ft 10 in)
- Hair colour: Brown
- Eye colour: Hazel
- Agency: Jonathan Sanders & Co (Worldwide); One Management (New York, Los Angeles); Marilyn Agency (Paris); View Management (Barcelona); Place Models (Germany); Next Models (Milan); Stockholmsgruppen (Stockholm)

Petra Němcová (Czech pronunciation: [ˈpɛtra ˈɲɛmtsovaː]; born 24 June 1979) is a Czech model, television host, and philanthropist who founded the Happy Hearts Fund. In 2017, the Happy Hearts Fund merged with All Hands Volunteers to create All Hands And Hearts - Smart Response, with Němcová assuming the role of co-founder and vice chair.

== Early life ==
Němcová was born in Karviná, then Czechoslovakia, now the Czech Republic, in the Moravian-Silesian Region.

== Career ==
=== Modeling ===
Scouted on the streets of Prague by NEXT Model Management, Němcová moved to Milan, Italy, upon signing with the agency. After winning the 1995 Czech Elite Model Look, she returned to Milan where her career flourished.

She has featured in campaigns for Benetton, Bulgari, Cartier, Clarins, Cortefiel, Dirk Bikkembergs, Fortunoff, Graff, Hewlett-Packard/Intel, HS, Intimissimi, John Lewis, Lancaster, La Perla, La Senza, Maidenform, Max Factor, Pantene Pro-V, Passport, Playtex, Rampage, Schwarzkopf, Victoria's Secret, and Wild Orchid. Němcová has appeared on international covers of Harper's Bazaar, Madame Figaro, Elle, Shape, Cosmopolitan, Marie Claire, Flare, Glamour, L'Officiel, and Sports Illustrated.

Němcová has walked for designers including Lolita Lempicka, Gai Mattiolo, Matthew Williamson, Guglielmo Cappone, Marina Babini, Yumi Katsura and Michiko Koshino.

Němcová gained attention outside the fashion industry after featuring on the cover of the 2003 Sports Illustrated Swimsuit Issue, from a shoot in Barbados by Walter Iooss. She also appeared in the 2002, 2003, 2004, 2005, and 2006 editions. She was the object/subject of Joanne Gair's body painting work. In January 2015 Němcová replaced Abbey Clancy as the face of Ultimo underwear. She also serves as the global face of Chopard.

=== Television ===
In 2001, Němcová appeared on British television series Absolutely Fabulous. On 3 June 2004, she was one of the telecast judges during the fifty-third annual Miss Universe competition in Quito, Ecuador. In 2007, she was the host of TLC's A Model Life. On 7 July 2007, she was a presenter at the American leg of Live Earth. Němcová was a contestant on season 12 of Dancing with the Stars with dance partner Dmitry Chaplin, reaching the fourth week before being eliminated.

In 2005, Němcová published her autobiography Love Always, Petra (ISBN 0446579130).

In the 2008 TV special, A Muppets Christmas: Letters to Santa, muppet lab assistant Beaker tests a wish machine and causes Němcová to appear.

== 2004 Indian Ocean tsunami ==
On 26 December 2004, Němcová was in Khao Lak, Thailand, with her main photographer and boyfriend, Simon Atlee, when the 2004 Indian Ocean earthquake and tsunami struck. Atlee drowned and Němcová suffered a broken pelvis and serious internal injuries, but she managed to hold on to a palm tree for eight hours until she was rescued by Thai civilians and airlifted to an inland hospital nearby.

== Philanthropy ==
Němcová served on the advisory board of Glamour's Women of the Year Fund.

Her autobiography, Love Always, Petra, was released in 2005 from which 100% of the profits were donated towards helping children affected both by the 2004 tsunami in Thailand and ongoing natural disasters worldwide.

=== Happy Hearts Fund ===
In 2005, Němcová founded the Happy Hearts Fund (HHF), a charitable organization and campaign formed after the tsunami of 2004. The main mission of Happy Hearts Fund has been to rebuild and renew schools affected by natural disasters. As a result of programmes run by the Happy Hearts Fund, 176 schools have been rebuilt world-wide in 10 countries including Thailand, Indonesia, Haiti, Nepal, Peru, Mexico and The Philippines. Němcová has been heavily involved on a day-to-day basis since establishing the Happy Hearts Fund, helping to establish long term strategies, as well as outlining the vision which has led to the organisations long term success. Her personal experience during the 2004 Boxing Day Tsunami gave her a deep understanding of the power of Mother Nature, allowing her to connect with those in need, bolstering the success of her work through the organisation. In late 2017, the Happy Hearts Fund merged with fellow non-profit organisation All Hands Volunteers to create All Hands And Hearts - Smart Response. As a result, Němcová now acts as co-founder and vice chair of All Hands And Hearts alongside All Hands Volunteers founder David Campbell.

=== All Hands And Hearts - Smart Response ===
Němcová is co-founder and vice chair of All Hands And Hearts - Smart Response (AHAH), a non-profit organisation dedicated to providing fast and effective support to communities hit by natural disasters worldwide. Němcová has spoken about the importance of connecting with and understanding the needs of those in need of hope, empowerment and immediate aid, stating that, "We cannot control nature, but we can control that actions that we take."

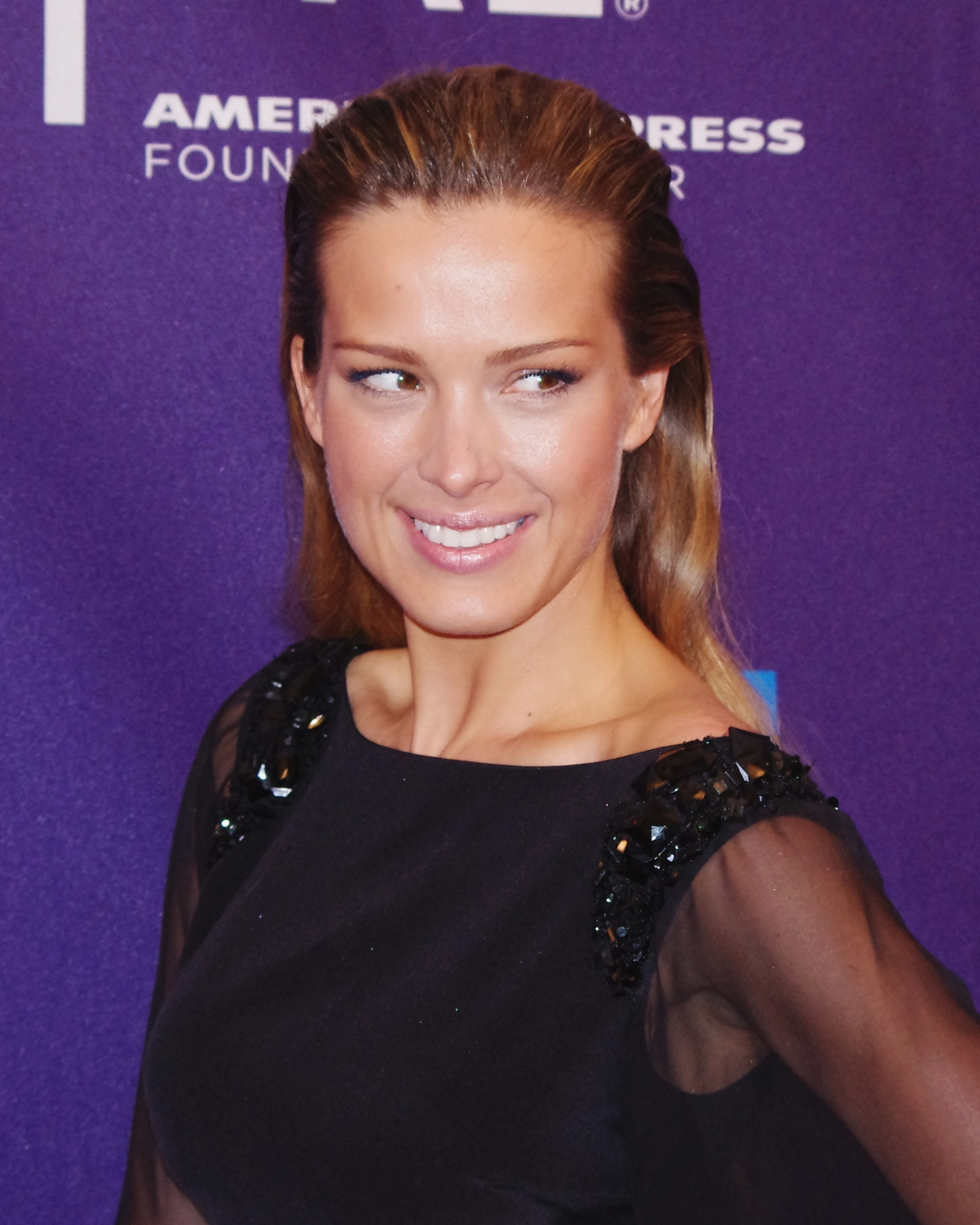
Němcová in 2012.

=== Accolades ===
Glamour magazine awarded Němcová a "Survivor Award" in 2005 for her charity work following her tsunami ordeal.

In June 2012, she was designated by president of Haiti Michel Martelly and Prime Minister Laurent Lamothe as Ambassador-at-Large for Haiti for her work with Happy Hearts Fund.

In 2017, Petra was appointed by the UNISDR as a Disaster Risk Reduction Champion and Tsunami Awareness Advocate.

== Personal life ==
Němcová has a sister, Olga, who also worked for the Happy Hearts Foundation. She has been a vegan since 2007 and has paid close attention to life in the world's oceans.

She was briefly engaged to English actor Jamie Belman before the couple ended their relationship in 2012.

In May 2014, Němcová told People that she was dating the Prime Minister of Haiti, Laurent Lamothe. but as of 2015 they were no longer together. In 2017, she became engaged to investment banker Alejandro Grimaldi before the pair called off their engagement in December 2018.

In 2019, Němcová married entrepreneur Benjamin Larretche in Sedona, Arizona. Their first child was born on 15 November 2019. He was premature, born at 34 weeks' gestation, and spent the first weeks of his life in a neonatal intensive care unit.
