= A Model Life =

Television series

- Cast of A Model Life
- Starring: Petra Němcová
- Country of origin: United States
- Original language: English
- No. of episodes: 8

Original release
- Network: TLC
- Release: July 13 – August 31, 2007

A Model Life is a reality television series hosted by model Petra Němcová that was built off some of the challenges she faced early in her career. The series debuted on July 13, 2007, on TLC in the United States and ran for one season. It followed six young models from around the world as they moved to New York City and try to earn a modeling contract with NEXT Modeling. There were no weekly eliminations.

== Cast ==
The participants included Lucia Dvorská, Abigail Fox, Angelika Oatway, Beatrice Bererra da Fontoura, Michelle Godin, and Valerija "Valeria" Erokhina.
