= David N. Campbell =

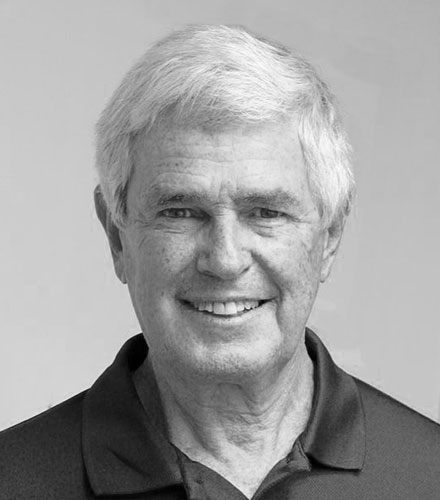
- David Campbell
- Born: November 4, 1941 (age 84)
- Known for: All Hands And Hearts - Smart Response

David Campbell (born November 4, 1941) is an American technology executive, corporate board member, and the founder of All Hands and Hearts, a nonprofit natural disaster response and rebuild organization. In 1997, while president of BBN Technologies of Cambridge, Mass., he was appointed by then-president Bill Clinton to the Advisory Committee to the President's Commission on Critical Infrastructure Protection. Campbell also was CEO of public companies Computer Task Group and Xpedior, and as a member of the Board of Directors of public companies Tektronix, M&T Bank, MRO Software, and Gibraltar Industries; as Trustee at both Niagara University and the University at Buffalo; as chairman for civic organizations including Roswell Park Comprehensive Cancer Center Council, the Buffalo United Way campaign, the Erie County IDA, and the Buffalo Chamber of Commerce.

== Personal life ==
Campbell was born on November 4, 1941. He is originally from Buffalo, New York and earned a Master of Science degree in Industrial Engineering and Operations Research from the University of Buffalo in 1966, where he has served as a trustee; after receiving a Bachelor of Sciences in Mathematics from Niagara University in 1963. He is the recipient of honorary doctorates from both Niagara University and Canisius College, Citizen of the year from The Buffalo News, the 2013 Richard Cornuelle Award and the Encore.org 2014 Symetra Purpose Prize.

Campbell started his career in 1963 with IBM and then left to join Computer Task Group. He is married to Gay Wind Campbell and the couple have 4 children.

== Honors and awards ==
- 2015 Wins the Points of Light Award
- 2015 St Vincent de Paul medal, Vincentian Heritage Convocation
- 2014 Encore.org Purpose Prize Award winner
- 2013 Richard Cornuelle Award for Social Entrepreneurship, Manhattan Institute
- 2006 Encore.org Purpose Prize Fellow
- 1993 Man of the Year, Buffalo News

== Bibliography ==
=== Books authored by Campbell ===
- Campbell, David (2015), All Hands: The Evolution of a Volunteer-Powered Disaster Response Organization
- Campbell, David (2014), Being There: The Creation of a Cool, Happy, and Surprisingly Effective Disaster Response Organization

=== Technology Patents ===
- Dec 03, 2002, US# 6,490,458 B1 "Portable phone bank"
- Nov 26, 2002, US# 6,487,284 B1 "Card pay telephone with speed dialing"
