= Corporate Emergency Access System =

Credentialing program in the United States

The Corporate Emergency Access System (CEAS) is a credentialing program in the United States for a company's critical employees. In the event of a disaster or a serious emergency, these employees can show their CEAS ID cards to first responders and be admitted to their business location. CEAS helps businesses mitigate damage and loss resulting by allowing them rapid access to restricted areas.

CEAS helps businesses mitigate damage and loss by allowing critical employees rapid access to restricted areas. This allows them to rapidly recover essential operations and retrieve assets such as securities and other valuables; vital records, computer hardware and critical equipment; and core IT systems. They can also conduct damage assessments.

CEAS was developed in New York State during the 1990s by the Business Network of Emergency Resources, a not-for-profit organization which pioneered this emergency-identification-card-based capability. The CEAS access system has been adopted by Boston and Cambridge in Massachusetts, Chester County and Philadelphia in Pennsylvania, Erie, Nassau, and Suffolk counties in New York, New York City, Baltimore and Stamford, Connecticut.

In order for businesses to enroll in CEAS, their local municipalities must adopt the CEAS Program and receive ID cards. The local authorities can implement CEAS following an emergency once immediate threats to life are stabilized. Participating businesses select a pre-determined number of employees to receive CEAS access ID cards based on total employee population.
