= Second responder =

Worker who supports first responders

A second responder is a worker who supports first responders such as police, fire, and emergency medical personnel. They are involved in preparing, managing, returning services, and cleaning up sites during and after an event requiring first responders. These sites may include crime scenes and areas damaged by fire, storm, wind, floods, earthquakes, or other natural disasters. These types of services may include utility services (shutdown or reinstatement of electrical, gas, sewage, and/or water services), wireless (3G/4G/WiFi) or wireline communication services, specialty construction (i.e. shelter construction), hazardous waste cleanup, road clearing, traffic control, crowd control, emergency services (i.e. Red Cross), first aid, food services, security services, social services (i.e., trauma counselors), and sanitation.

The overriding objective of these designated professionals is to quickly enable people to get back to work and ensure the viability, continuity and recovery of economic life for public and private-sector organizations. It is believed that in a major event there might be as many as 3 to 10 second responders for every first responder. Coordinating the activities of all second responders is a communications intensive activity usually the responsibility of the on-site Incident Commander. The guidelines and responsibilities of the Incident Commander are described in the U.S. Federal Emergency Management Agency National Incident Management System (NIMS) training program.

Because identifying and empowering second responders helps make the difference between lingering disruption and the necessary and timely restoration of daily life, many state and local governments are adopting the unique “second responder” identification protocol known as the Corporate Emergency Access System (CEAS).

CEAS was developed in New York State during the 1990s by the Business Network of Emergency Resources, a not-for-profit organization which pioneered this emergency-identification-card-based capability.

== See also ==
- First aid
- Emergency medical responder levels by U.S. state
- First responder
