= Noah's Wish =

Animal rescue charity

Noah's Wishdwa
- Formation: 2002; 24 years ago
- Tax ID no.: 35-2167619
- Location: Sacramento, California
- Revenue: $14,849 (2016)

Noah's Wish was a charity that rescues and takes care of animals endangered by natural disasters.

The mission of Noah's Wish is to save animals during disasters with their rescue and recovery services and to mitigate the impact of disasters on animals through educational outreach programs.

The organization travels to areas affected by disaster and evacuate pets and livestock. They shelter, feed and provide medical care for the animals until they can be returned to their owners or housed more permanently. Based in El Dorado Hills, California, the organization has helped relief efforts internationally, such as after the 2004 Boxing Day tsunami hit Sri Lanka in December 2004 and after the August 2005 flooding in Romania. Within North America, they have assisted in the wake of a number of forest fires and hurricanes since being founded in 2002. Outside of relief work, the organization trains volunteers to deal effectively and practically in disaster situations.

Noah's Wish set up a rescue operation in Slidell, Louisiana, after Hurricane Katrina hit the Gulf Coast in September 2005. As of November 25, 2005 they cared for 1,564 animals during this situation, and reunited more than 1,257 lost pets with their owners.

== Legal troubles ==
After Hurricane Katrina, Noah's Wish settled with the state of California, forfeiting $4 million of $8 million it had collected. Noah's Wish was one of a few, but egregious, animal charity scams. The forfeiture was used to build an animal rescue shelter in Slidell, Louisiana.
