= First responder =

Trained emergency personnel

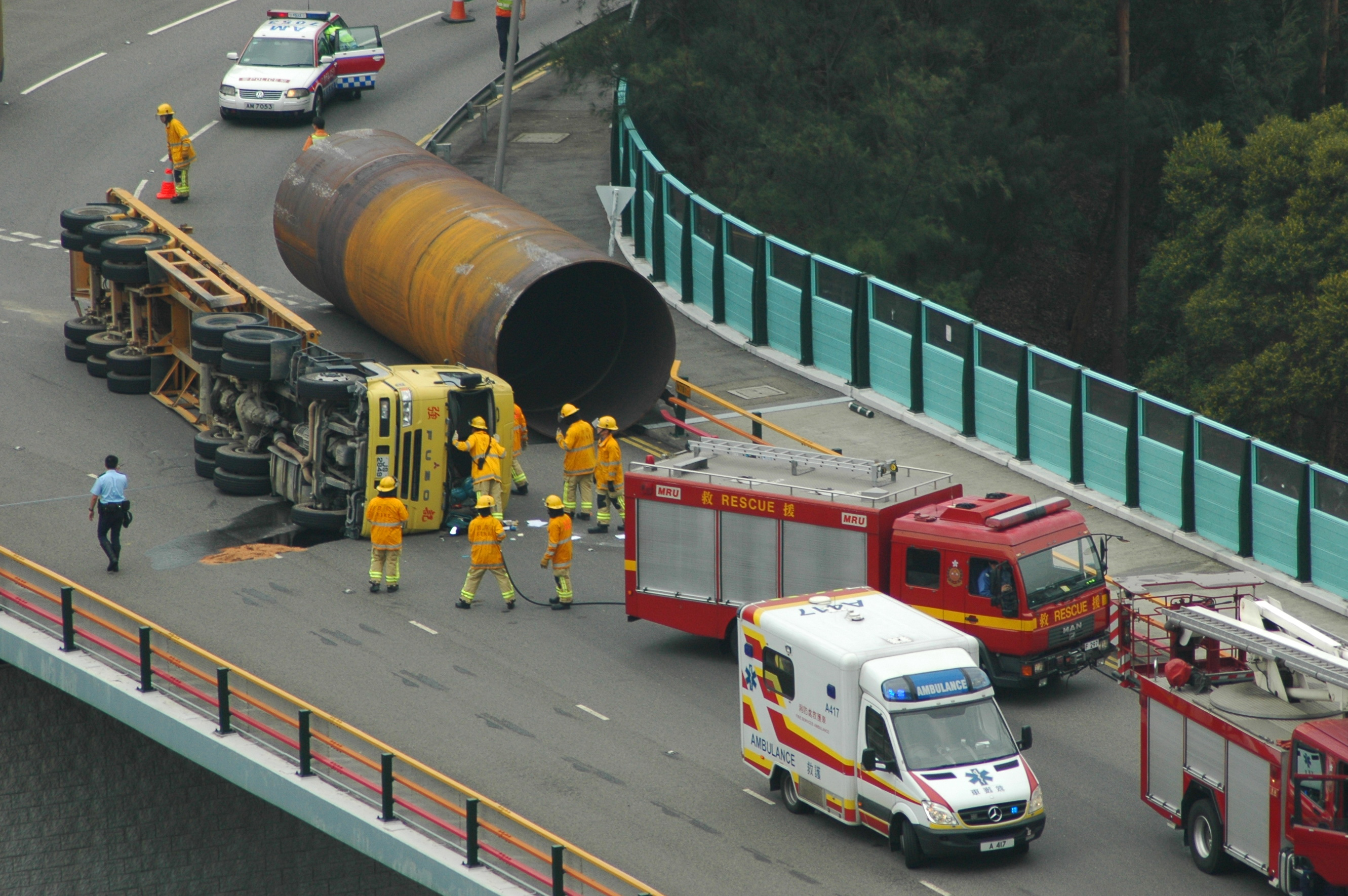
First responders at the scene of a traffic accident in Hong Kong

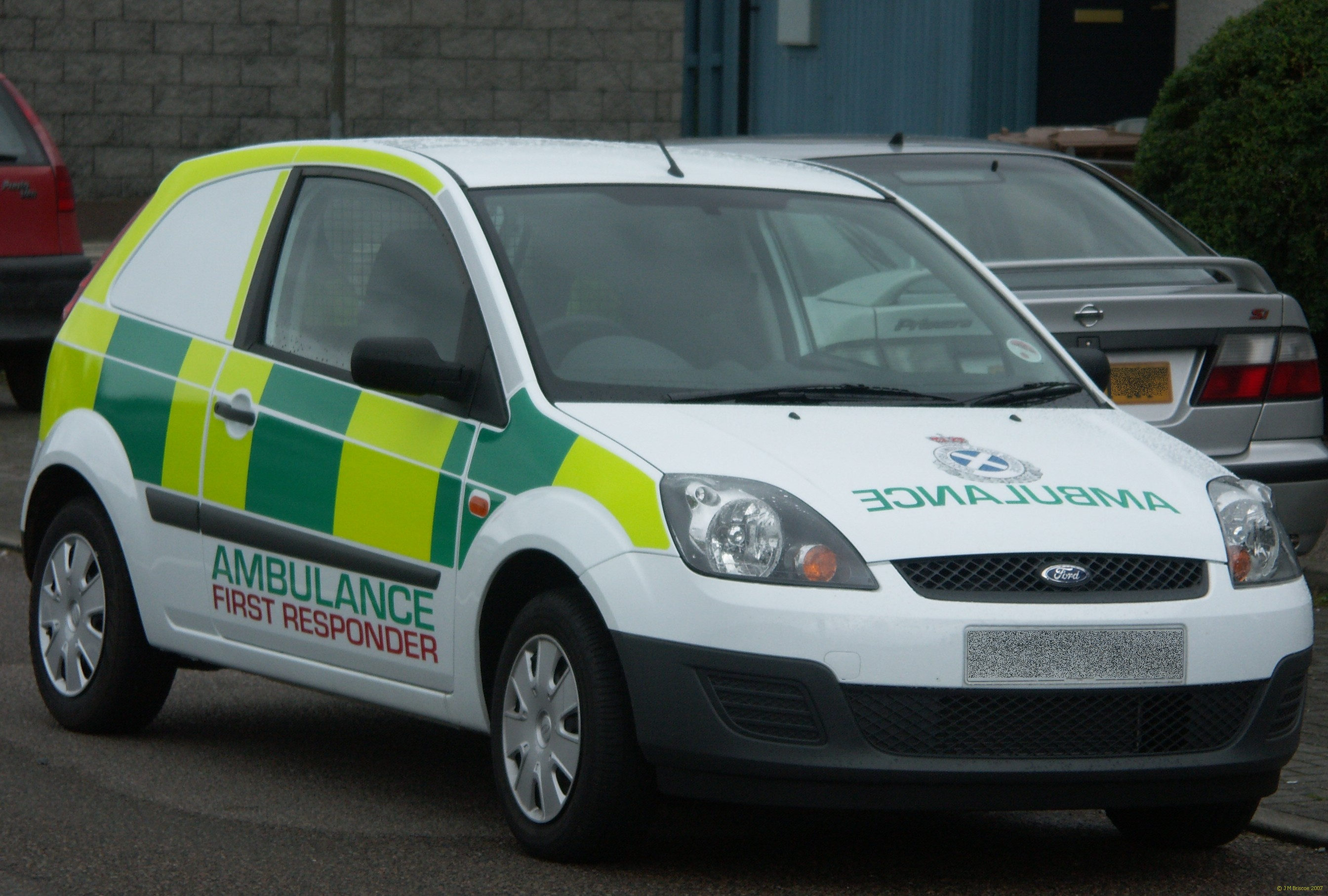
A Scottish Ambulance Service nontransporting EMS vehicle, referred to by markings on the vehicle as a "first responder" vehicle

A first responder is a person with specialized training who is among the first to respond and provide assistance or incident resolution at the scene of an emergency. First responders typically include:

- law enforcement officers (commonly known as police officers),
- emergency medical services members (such as EMTs or paramedics), and
- fire service members (such as firefighters, search and rescue members, technical/heavy rescue members, etc.)
- Emergency Telecommunicator

In some jurisdictions, emergency department personnel, such as doctors and nurses, are also required to respond to disasters and critical situations, designating them first responders; in other jurisdictions, military and security forces may also be authorized to act as first responders.

In a medical context, certified first responder is an individual who has received certification to provide pre-hospital care in a certain jurisdiction. A community first responder is a person dispatched to attend medical emergencies until an ambulance arrives. A wilderness first responder is trained to provide pre-hospital care in remote settings who has skills relevant to ad hoc patient care and transport by non-motorized means. Public Works departments are also recognized as First Responders as they are generally called to clean up natural disasters, plow snow and maintain roads as well as provide rescue support in extreme weather scenarios. Support for first responders, including preparation and cleanup, is usually performed by second responders.

== Etymology ==
The use of the term "first responder" in the current sense first emerged in the United States in the 1970s. Perhaps the earliest uses in print occurred in two articles in The Boston Globe in August 1973, about proposed ambulance regulations in Massachusetts.

"…any police or fireman who staff a 'dual-purpose' vehicle would have to be trained to offer 'first-responder' care — that is, to stabilize a patient until more sophisticated help arrived." "The chances are even better that your emergency call will be answered by a police or fire vehicle doing double duty instead of an adequately equipped ambulance and a paramedic trained in 'first responder' care."

There were some earlier uses of "first response", though not "first responder", in this sense. They included an article in the Grand Junction Daily Sentinel in March 1972, and another about the formation of a "First Response Group" composed of volunteers in The Burlington Free Press in April 1973.

A few months after its use in the Globe, the term "first-responders" appeared in a Boston Herald article about a master plan for emergency care from the Health Planning Council of Greater Boston. One of the recommendations in the plan, reported the Herald, was that "All ambulance personnel and first-responders (who are general police and firemen) should be adequately trained in emergency care such as cardopulmonary [sic] resuscitation."

"First-responder" was also used in a July 1974 classified advertisement for a deputy chief of EMT training—"to assist in developing and implementing statewide training programs for EMT's and first-responders"—from the Massachusetts Department of Public Health.

== Specific jurisdictions ==
Some jurisdictions have special laws defining and establishing the rights and duties of first responders.

=== United States ===
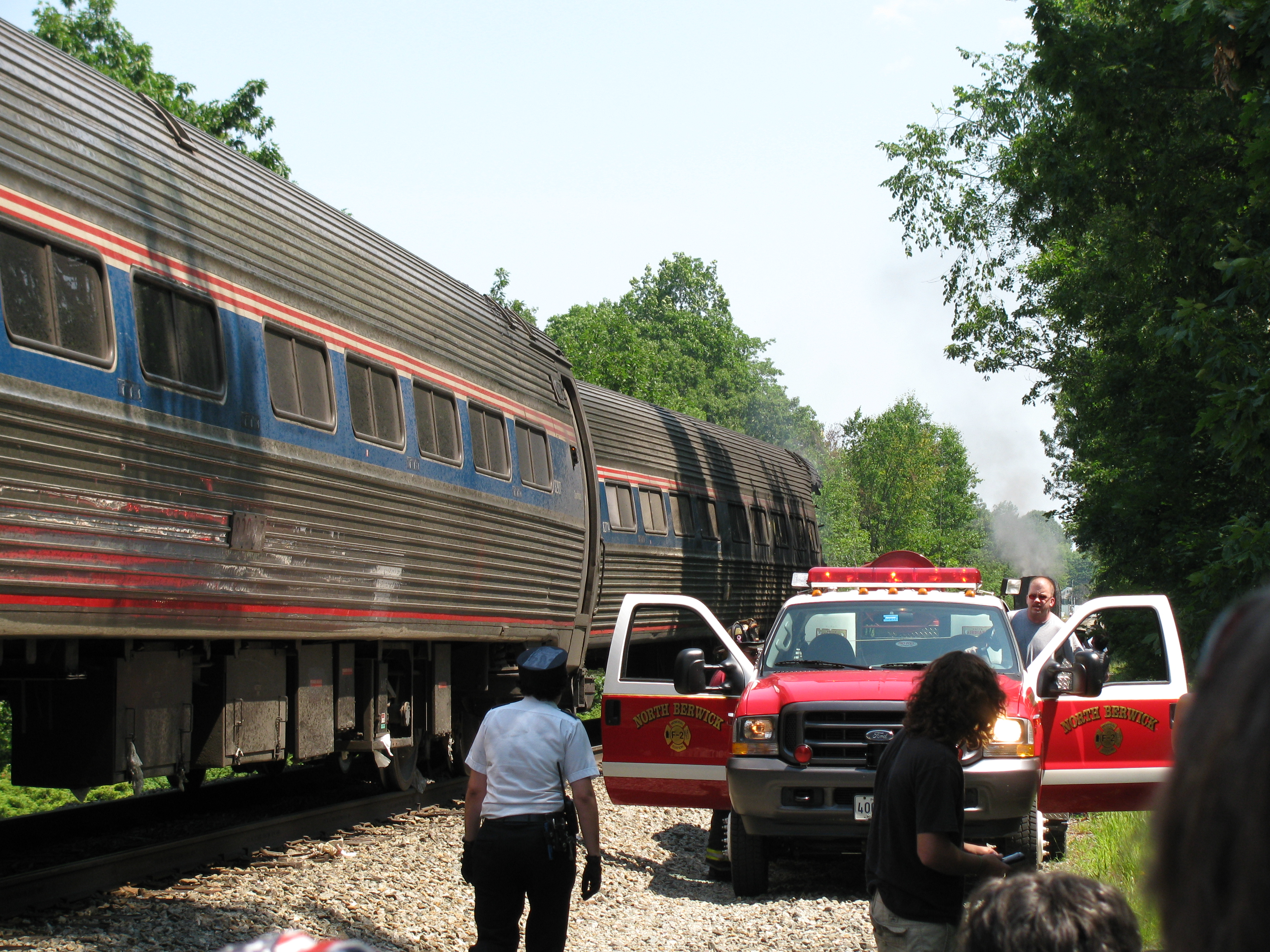
First responders at the site of a train collision in the United States

The term "first responder" is defined in U.S. Homeland Security Presidential Directive, HSPD-8 and reads:

The term "first responder" refers to those individuals who in the early stages of an incident are responsible for the protection and preservation of life, property, evidence, and the environment, including emergency response providers as defined in section 2 of the Homeland Security Act of 2002 (6 U.S.C. § 101), as well as emergency management, public health, clinical care, public works, and other skilled support personnel (such as equipment operators) that provide immediate support services during prevention, response, and recovery operations.

"Emergency response providers" are defined by 6 U.S.C. § 101 as follows:

(6) The term "emergency response providers" includes Federal, State, and local governmental and nongovernmental emergency public safety, fire, law enforcement, public safety telecommunicators/dispatcher, emergency response, emergency medical services providers (including hospital emergency facilities), and related personnel, agencies, and authorities.

== Issues ==
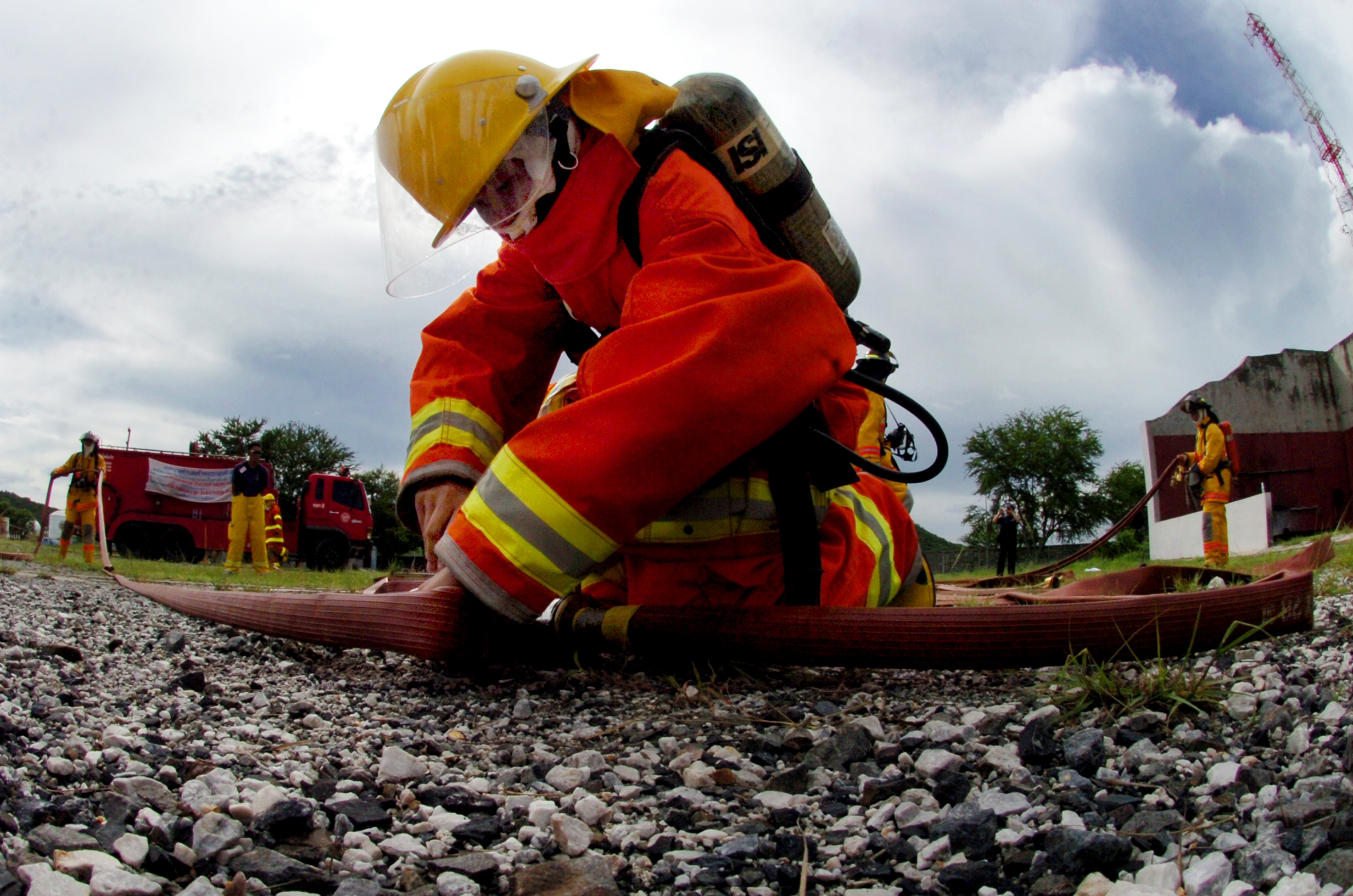
A training exercise for first responders in Thailand

First responders must be trained to deal with a wide array of potential emergencies. Due to the high level of stress and uncertainty associated with the position, first responders must maintain physical and mental health. Even with such preparation, first responders experience unique risks of being the first people to aid those with unknown contagions. For example, in 2003 first responders were among the earliest cases of the previously unknown SARS virus, when they cared for patients affected with the virus.

Infectious disease has continued to be a major occupational health concern among first responders with the COVID-19 pandemic. The CDC and other agencies and organizations have issued guidance regarding workplace hazard controls for COVID-19. Specific precautions for first responders include modified call queries, symptom screening, universal PPE use, hand hygiene, physical distancing, and stringent disinfection protocols.

== See also ==
- Trauma and first responders
- First aid
- Emergency medical responder levels by U.S. state
- Second responder
- Global Prehospital Consortium
